= Emily Marshall =

English lay Anglican (1832–1915)

- Born: Emily Esther Marshall; 4 December 1832; Upper Clapton, London, England
- Died: 23 June 1915 (aged 82); Ripon, England
- Education: at home
- Occupation: of " independent means"
- Known for: championing women in the Anglican church and reviving the Third Order of Saint Francis
- Relatives: Proctor Swaby (brother in law)

Emily Esther Marshall (4 December 1832 – 23 June 1915) was a British advocate of an ordained ministry for women and the founder of an Anglican Franciscan third order.

== Life ==
Marshall was born in Upper Clapton in London in 1832. She was the middle child of seven born to Jane and Laurence Jopson Marshall. Her father was an underwriter and her parents had her educated at home. She was of " independent means" and made her home in Sunderland where her brother in law, Proctor Swaby, was the minister in Casteletown. She was one of his pastoral assistants.

The Bishop of Durham J. B. Lightfoot had said that he was open to the idea of a diaconate that included women and in 1899 Marshall wrote a pamphlet titled A Suggestion for our Times on this theme. Marshall said later that, she was told by Lightfoot that he wanted to try her idea of training women in his diocese. Marshall discussed her plans with Lightfoot and she saw that a revival of a Third Order of Saint Francis would assist. She obtained a copy of Paul Sabatier's La vie de St. François d'Assise (translated as Life of St. Francis of Assisi). The book was included in the Catholic Church's Index of Forbidden Books in 1894. Marshall obtained a copy and went to meet Bishop Lightfoot. He agreed that her ideas for reviving the Third Order were in line with the ideas of St Francis. As a result, she wrote "The dawn breaking, and some thoughts on the third order of St. Francis, with translation from the French" in 1896. Her ideas took root in the Anglican church in Guyana.

However Lightfoot's death in 1889 resulted in her plans being shut down in England. Bishop B. F. Westcott who was Lightfoot's successor appointed deaconesses who were not women deacons. His women had a different role and this undermined the idea of an order of men and women equitably appointed. Body invited Marshall and four other women to be church workers as part of the League of St Cuthbert in 1891. Body had taken her idea but it became known as "Canon Body's Third Order". He forbade from her of talking about the idea of a revived order and she no longer had the ear of Bishop Lightfoot. However her brother-in-law was appointed to be the Bishop in Guyana.

In Guyana her brother-in-law encouraged the development of a Third Order of Saint Francis within the Anglican church based on her work. Swaby's archdeacon Fortunato Pietro Luigi Josa had published St. Francis of Assisi and the Third Order in the Anglo-Catholic Church in 1898 quoting text from Marshall's writings but without naming her. The idea grew and when Swaby was translated to Barbados and the Windward Islands in December 1899/1900 then the new order quickly took hold.

Marshall had created a new religious order within the church based on Lightfoot's discussion of the Third Order of Saint Francis who had historically consisted of men and women who did not live in monasteries or wear cowls. Marshall however regretted throughout her life that the diaconate idea had been lost due to his death.

Marshall died in Ripon.
