= Geoffrey Cates =

British Anglican priest

Geoffrey Charles Cates (13 June 1918 – 2003) was the Dean of St George's Cathedral, Georgetown, Guyana from 1961 to 1971. Born in Surrey and educated at the University of Leeds, he was ordained in 1944 and began his career with curacies at Spennymoor and Ushaw Moor. In 1949 he was appointed Chaplain of the Butlin's Holiday Camp in Clacton-on-Sea, a post he held until his appointment as Vicar of Kumasi in Ghana. In 1961 he entered the Deanery of the Anglican Diocese of Guyana, where he remained for a decade. Returning to England he was Rector of Sacred Trinity, Salford and Rural Dean of The area. His final post until his retirement in 1988 was in the Diocese of St Edmundsbury and Ipswich and he remained in Ipswich until his death in 2003. He was an honorary Canon of his final diocese, having previously held a similar post in Manchester.

== Notes ==
Church of England titles
| Preceded by Ronald Ragsdale Sargison | Deans of St George's Cathedral, Georgetown; 1961 – 1971 | Succeeded by Randolph Oswald George |
