= Oswald Trellis =

English cathedral dean

Oswald Fitz Burnell Trellis was the Dean of St George's Cathedral, Georgetown, Guyana from 1994. until 2002.

Born January 1, 1935 he was ordained in 1975. After studying at Chichester Theological College, he began his ecclesiastical career with Chelmsford curacies before being appointed Vicar of Heybridge in 1985. In 1994 he was elected to the Deanery of the Anglican Diocese of Guyana. He resigned in 2002 and returned to Essex as Priest in charge of the Church of All Saints, Doddinghurst, a post he resigned in April 2005.

== Notes ==
Church of England titles
Preceded by Derek Goodrich	Deans of St George's Cathedral, Georgetown; 1994 –2002	Succeeded by Terry Davis
