= James Clement (priest) =

James Orlando Clement
- Dean of St George's Cathedral, Georgetown, Guyana
- Church: Anglican Church
- Diocese: Diocese of Guyana
- Installed: 1976
- Term ended: 1983
- Predecessor: Randolph George
- Successor: Derek Goodrich

Personal details
- Denomination: Anglican
- Education: Codrington College, Barbados

James Orlando Clement was the Dean of St George's Cathedral, Georgetown, Guyana from 1976 until 1983. He was ordained in 1950 after a period of study at Codrington College, Barbados. He began his ecclesiastical career with a curacy in Montserrat before being appointed Vicar of St George’s in the same country in 1952. After further incumbencies in Anguilla, Antigua and St Kitts he was appointed to a Guyanese parish (Lodge) in 1967. Nine years later he was elected to the Deanery of the Diocese.

Church of England titles
Preceded by Randolph George	Deans of St George's Cathedral, Georgetown; 1976 –1983	Succeeded by Derek Goodrich
