= John May (priest) =

Anglican Dean in British Guiana (died 1893)

Henry John May was the Dean of St George's Cathedral, Georgetown, Guyana, from 1890 until 1893. Previously he had been priest in charge at Enmore, Guyana.

In the late 1850s, May was a missionary on the Mahaicony River, making efforts to have indigenous people build a church. In 1858 he reported to the SPG on good progress of children in the local school. In 1871 he gave a positive report on conversion work by a catechist at settlements in Essequibo Islands-West Demerara. He was Rector of St Swithin's, West Bank Demerara in 1881; and the Rural Dean of Mindenburg.

== Notes ==
Anglican Communion titles
Preceded by Francis Austin	Deans of St George's Cathedral, Georgetown; 1889 – 1893	Succeeded by Emil Caswell
