= John Mitchinson (bishop) =

British teacher and Anglican priest

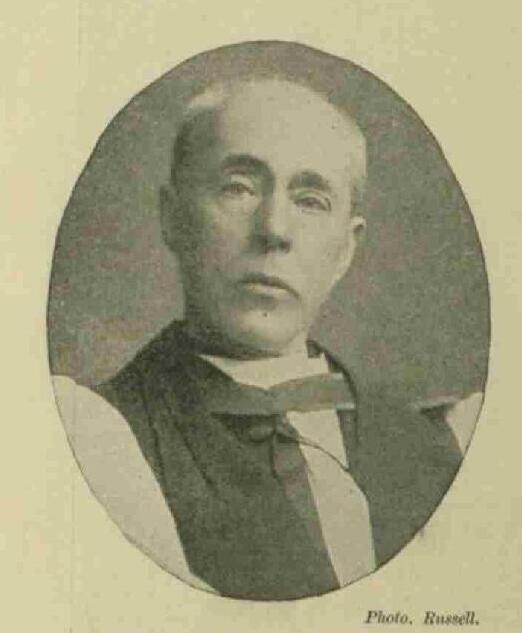
- Born: 23 September 1833; Durham
- Died: 25 September 1918 (aged 85); Gloucester
- Alma mater: Durham School; Pembroke College
- Position held: bishop, Master of Pembroke College

John Mitchinson (23 September 1833 – 25 September 1918) was a British teacher and Anglican priest who was Bishop of Barbados and later served as Master of Pembroke College, Oxford.

== Education ==
He was born in Durham on 23 September 1833 and educated at Durham School and at Pembroke College, Oxford, where he gained first class honours in literae humaniores (classics) and natural science.

== Career ==
He was an Assistant Master at Merchant Taylors' School, Northwood, then Headmaster of the King's School, Canterbury from 1859 to 1873. Ordained in 1860, he became part of the staff of St Philip's Church, Clerkenwell, under Warwick Reed Wroth.

In 1873, he was appointed Bishop of Barbados, holding the post for eight years, but becoming known as Bishop of Barbados and the Windward Islands from 1877, when he created the separate Diocese of the Windward Islands but remained as bishop over that diocese too. He also served as coadjutor bishop (1879–1882) for Walrond Jackson, Bishop of Antigua, visiting those islands on Jackson's behalf because he was forced to remain in England in illness. During his time in Barbados, he secured the affiliation of Codrington College to the University of Durham.

In 1881, his health forced him to return to England, where from July 1881 – 1899 he was Rector of Sibstone; Assistant Bishop of Peterborough, August 1881 – November 1900 (he "administered the See", i.e. temporarily acted up as Bishop of Peterborough, for a short time during Edward Carr Glyn's illness); and Archdeacon of Leicester, 1886–1899. During the 1885 vacancy in the See of Manchester, he served as the Archbishop of York's episcopal commissary in that diocese — effectively its acting diocesan bishop.

In 1899 he returned to his former college as Master, where he was credited with recovering the fortunes of the college. The mastership brought with it an ex officio canonry of Gloucester Cathedral, in which diocese he also undertook some limited episcopal duties.

He was on the governing body of Abingdon School from 1899 to 1912 and was Chairman of the Governors from 1900 to 1908.

He had a reputation as an antiquary, and visited all the monastic ruins in England and Wales, assembling an extensive collection of photographs and drawings of them which is now kept by the Bodleian Library. He was also a skilled musician, and a scientist, having discovered and given his name to a trilobite (trilobites mitchinsonii).

He remained at Pembroke until his death on 25 September 1918. He had become a Doctor of Divinity (DD). He was created a Companion of the Roll of Honour of the Memorial of Merit of King Charles the Martyr in 1913.

== Notes and references ==
Anglican Communion titles
Preceded by Thomas Parry	Bishop of Barbados "...and the Windward Islands" from 1877; 1873–1881	Succeeded by Herbert Bree
Academic offices
Preceded by Bartholomew Price	Master of Pembroke College, Oxford; 1899–1918	Succeeded by Frederick Homes Dudden
