= 1973 New Year Honours =

British royal recognitions

The New Year Honours 1973 were appointments in many of the Commonwealth realms of Queen Elizabeth II to various orders and honours to reward and highlight good works by citizens of those countries. They were announced on 1 January 1973 to celebrate the year passed and mark the beginning of 1973.

== United Kingdom ==
=== Life Peer (Baron) ===
- Sir Arthur Espie Porritt, Bt, G.C.M.G., G.C.V.O., C.B.E., lately Governor-General of New Zealand.

=== Privy Counsellor ===
- Sir William Armstrong, G.C.B., M.V.O., Head of the Home Civil Service.
- The Honourable Mr Justice Melford Stevenson (Sir Aubrey Melford Steed Stevenson), A Judge of the High Court of Justice (Queen's Bench Division).

=== Knight Bachelor ===
- Kenneth Charles Peto Barrington, Director, Morgan Grenfell and Company Ltd.
- William Bradshaw Batty, T.D., Chairman and Managing Director, Ford Motor Company Ltd. For services to Export.
- Douglas Andrew Kilgour Black, Professor of Medicine, University of Manchester.
- The Honourable Phillip Rodney Bridges, C.M.G., Chief Justice of The Gambia.
- George Neville Butterworth, Chairman, English Calico Ltd.
- Francis Arthur Cockfield, Adviser on Fiscal Policy, H.M. Treasury.
- Professor Theodore Crawford, Director of Pathological Services, St George's Hospital and Medical School.
- Hugh Kinsman Cudlipp, O.B.E. For services to Journalism.
- David Henry Davies, General Secretary, Iron and Steel Trades Confederation.
- James Drake, C.B.E., lately County Surveyor, Lancashire.
- Eric Eastwood, C.B.E., F.R.S., Director of Research, General Electric Company Ltd.
- Colonel Ralph Harry Carr-Ellison, T.D. For political and public services in Northumberland.
- Brigadier Eric Herbert Cokayne Frith, C.B.E., Chairman, Official Side, Police Council for the United Kingdom.
- Reginald Ernest Griffiths, C.B.E., lately Secretary, Local Authorities' Conditions of Service Advisory Board.
- Charles Barnard Groves, C.B.E., Musical Director, Royal Liverpool Philharmonic Society.
- David Ronald Holmes, C.M.G., C.B E., M.C., E.D., Chairman, Public Services Commission, Hong Kong.
- Alan Blyth Hume, C.B., Secretary, Scottish Development Department.
- Stanley Marks Krusin, C.B., Second Parliamentary Counsel.
- Norman Lindop, Director, Hatfield Polytechnic.
- Harry Livermore. For services to the Arts on Merseyside.
- Isidore Jack Lyons, C.B E. For public and charitable services and services to the Arts.
- James Wright Macfarlane, D.L. For services to local government in Scotland.
- Robert Mark, Q.P.M., Commissioner of Police of the Metropolis.
- Brian Morton, Chairman, Londonderry Development Commission.
- Stanley William Gibson Morton, Chairman, Abbey National Building Society.
- Arthur Douglas Dodds-Parker, M P. For political and public services.
- Harald Peake, Chairman, Royal Air Force Benevolent Fund.
- The Honourable James Eugene Pearman, C.B.E. For public services in Bermuda.
- William John Peel, M P. For political and public services.
- Clement Frederick Penruddock, C.B.E, lately Secretary, The Chequers Trust.
- Derek George Rayner, lately Chief Executive (Procurement Executive), Ministry of Defence.
- Albert William Cecil Ryland, C B., Chairman, The Post Office.
- Peter Markham Scott, C.B E., D.S.C. For services to conservation and the environment.
- Gerald Bowers Thorley, T.D., Chairman, British Sugar Corporation Ltd., and Chairman, Allied Breweries Ltd.
- Francis Arthur Vick, O.B.E., President and Vice-Chancellor, Queen's University of Belfast.
- Edgar Trevor Williams, C.B., C.B E., D S.O., D.L., Secretary of the Rhodes Trust.
- Frank George Young, Professor of Biochemistry, University of Cambridge.

Australian States

State of New South Wales
- Alastair Edward Stephen. For services to the community.
- Paul Strasser. For services to the building industry and to charity.

State of Victoria
- Ernest William Coates, C.M.G, Director of Finance and Head of the State Treasury.
- The Honourable Mr Justice Douglas Macfarlan Little, Judge of the Supreme Court of Victoria.

State of Queensland
- Albert Sakzewski, of Brisbane. For services to commerce, sport and charity.

=== Order of the Bath ===
==== Knight Grand Cross of the Order of the Bath (GCB) ====
- General Sir Peter Mervyn Hunt, K C.B., D.S.O., O.B.E., late Infantry, Colonel Queen's Own Highlanders (Seaforth and Camerons), Colonel 10th Princess Mary's Own Gurkha Rifles.
- Air Chief Marshal Sir Christopher Foxley-Norris, K.C.B, D.S.O., O.B.E., Royal Air Force.
- Sir Douglas Albert Vivian Allen, K.C.B., Permanent Secretary, H.M. Treasury.

==== Knight Commander of the Order of the Bath (KCB) ====
- Admiral Leslie Derek Empson, C B.
- Vice Admiral Terence Thornton Lewin, M.V.O., D.S.C., C.B.
- Lieutenant-General Terence Douglas Herbert McMeekin, C.B., O.B.E., late Royal Regiment of Artillery.
- Lieutenant-General David John Willison, O.B E., M.C., late Corps of Royal Engineers.
- Air Marshal Nigel Martin Maynard, C.B., C.B.E., D.F.C., A.F.C., Royal Air Force.
- Professor Hermann Bondi, Chief Scientific Adviser, Ministry of Defence.
- Professor Claus Adolf Moser, C.B.E., F.B.A., Director, Central Statistical Office, Cabinet Office.

==== Companion of the Order of the Bath (CB) ====
Military Division

- Rear Admiral Geoffrey Penrose Dickinson Hall, D.S.C.
- Surgeon Rear Admiral (D) John Hunter, O.B.E., Q.H.D.S.
- Rear Admiral Martin Noel Lucey, D.S C.
- Rear Admiral Geoffrey Charles Mitchell.
- Major-General Sutton Martin O'Heguerty Abraham, M.C., late Royal Armoured Corps.
- Major-General The Right Honourable Alan, Earl Cathcart, D.S.O, M.C., late Foot Guards.
- Major-General Reginald John Gray, Q.H.S., M.B., B.S., M.F.C.M., M.B.I.M., late Royal Army Medical Corps.
- Major-General Patrick John Howard Dobson, late Royal Armoured Corps, Colonel The Queen's Own Hussars.
- Major-General Alec Ernest Walkling, O.B.E., late Royal Regiment of Artillery.
- Air Vice-Marshal Edward Dixon Crew, D.S.O., D.F.C., Royal Air Force.
- Air Vice-Marshal Edward Leslie Frith, Royal Air Force.
- Air Vice-Marshal Frank Sydney Roland Johnson, O.B E., Royal Air Force.
- Air Commodore Clifford John Turner, M.B.E., Royal Air Force.

Civil Division

- Thomas Lorne Beagley, Deputy Secretary, Department of the Environment.
- Antony James Gulliford Crocker, Under Secretary, Department of Health and Social Security.
- Keith Alfred Thomas Davey, Solicitor and Legal Adviser, Department of the Environment.
- Christopher Winthrop Fogarty, Deputy Secretary, H M.Treasury.
- Cyril Percival Fogg, Deputy Controller of Electronics, Ministry of Defence.
- Robert Haynes, Deputy Under-Secretary of State, Ministry of Defence.
- Christopher Alfred Herbert, Principle Director, Ministry of Defence.
- John Gibson Hill, Permanent Secretary, Ministry of Home Affairs for Northern Ireland.
- Arthur David Holland, T.D., Chief Highway Engineer, Department of the Environment.
- Robert Farquharson Keith, O.B.E., Chief Registrar for Trade Unions and Employers' Associations.
- Gregory Krikorian, Solicitor, Board of Customs and Excise.
- John Gordon Liverman, O.B.E., Deputy Secretary, Department of Trade and Industry.
- Professor Basil John Mason, F.R S., Director-General, Meteorological Office.
- Eric George Rufus Moses, Solicitor, Board of Inland Revenue.
- Peter Sansome Preston, Deputy Secretary, Department of Trade and Industry.
- Walter Riddell Smith, Deputy Director General, Agricultural Development and Advisory Service, Ministry of Agriculture, Fisheries and Food.

=== Order of St Michael and St George ===
==== Knight Grand Cross of the Order of St Michael and St George (GCMG) ====
- Sir John Pilcher, K.C.M.G., lately H.M. Ambassador, Tokyo.

==== Knight Commander of the Order of St Michael and St George (KCMG) ====
- John Mansfield Addis, C.M.G., H.M. Ambassador, Peking.
- George Raymond Bell, C.B., Deputy Secretary, H.M. Treasury.
- James Reginald Alfred Bottomley, C.M.G., H.M. Ambassador, South Africa.
- Arthur Michael Palliser, C.M.G., H.M. Ambassador to the European Economic Communities, Brussels.
- Bryan Clieve Roberts, C.M.G., Q.C., lately Attorney-General, Secretary to President and Cabinet, Malawi.

==== Companion of the Order of St Michael and St George (CMG) ====
- Iorwerth Eiddon Stephen Edwards, C.B.E., Keeper of Egyptian Antiquities, British Museum.
- Wallace Fox, Director, Tuberculosis and Chest Diseases Unit, Medical Research Council.
- Guy Hunter. For services to developing countries.
- Miss Elizabeth Monroe (Mrs Neame). For services to Middle East studies.
- Douglas Ernest Warren, Director of Overseas Surveys, Foreign and Commonwealth Office (Overseas Development Administration).
- Christopher John Audland, Counsellor and Head of Chancery, H.M. Embassy, Bonn.
- Norman Ernest Cox, lately Counsellor (Commercial), H.M. Embassy, Moscow.
- Derek Malcolm Day, Counsellor, British High Commission, Nicosia.
- Hugh Jarrett Herbert-Jones, Counsellor, Foreign and Commonwealth Office.
- Paul Cecil Henry Holmer, H.M. Ambassador, Abidjan.
- William Martin Hill, lately Special Consultant to the United Nations, New York.
- Philip Robert Aked Mansfield, Counsellor, Foreign and Commonwealth Office.
- Donald Frederick Murray, lately Counsellor, H.M. Embassy, Tehran.
- John Robert Williams, British High Commissioner, Suva.

Australian States

State of New South Wales
- Norman Thomas William Allan, M.V.O., Q.P.M., lately Commissioner, New South Wales Police Force.

State of Victoria
- John Henry Stockton Lindell, of Eaglemont. For services to medicine and hospital administration.
- Warwick Geoffrey Smith, M.V.O., O.B.E., Personal Assistant to the Premier and Chief Protocol Officer.

State of Queensland
- David Walter Longland, Chairman, Public Service Board.

=== Royal Victorian Order ===
==== Knight Commander of the Royal Victorian Order (KCVO) ====
- Colonel Sir Robert Eric Sherlock Gooch, Bt, D.S.O.
- Francis John Bagott Watson, C.V.O.

==== Commander of the Royal Victorian Order (CVO) ====
- Kathryn Edith Helen, Mrs Dugdale.
- Frederick Anthony Evans.
- Charles Matthew Farrer.
- Major Andrew William Haig, M.V.O., T.D.
- Ronald John Hill, M.V.O., M.B.E.
- Henry Peat, D.F.C.
- James Starritt, Deputy Commissioner, Metropolitan Police.
- Hugo Douglas Teare.

==== Member of the Royal Victorian Order (MVO) ====
- Richard Clarke Allan.
- Commander Christopher John Tankerville Chamberlen, Royal Navy.
- Hugh William Farmar.
- Philip Argyll Horton.
- Julian St John Loyd.
- Squadron Leader Reginald Ernest Michie, M.B.E., Royal Air Force.
- Squadron Leader Horace George Sealey, Royal Air Force.
- Surgeon Commander Ronald Edward Snow, Royal Navy.
- Deborah Elizabeth King.
- Shirley Jean, Mrs Linfoot.
- Douglas Mackay.

=== Royal Victorian Medal (Silver) ===
- Florence Lilian Bennett.
- Lyndon Louisa Ellen Bray.
- Walter George Brayne.
- John Brobbel, B.E.M.
- Cecil William Castle.
- Sergeant John George Collins, Royal Air Force.
- William Alfred Dawe.
- Joseph Groom.
- Frederick Thomas Huish.
- Samuel Leslie Kemble.
- Chief Petty Officer Ellis Victor Norrell.
- Sergeant Roger Frederick Pilon, Royal Air Force.
- Harold Arthur Purvey.
- Chief Medical Technician (Physiotherapy) (Nursing) Kenneth Ivor Rex Scutt.
- Jaines William Smith.
- Frank Spalton.
- Frederick George Waite.
- Chief Technician Reginald John Welch, Royal Air Force.

=== Order of the British Empire ===
==== Knight Grand Cross of the Order of the British Empire (GBE) ====
- The Right Honourable John Roland, Baron Martonmere, K.C.M.G., lately Governor and Commander-in-Chief, Bermuda.

==== Dame Commander of the Order of the British Empire (DBE) ====
- Miss Kathleen Mary Kenyon, C.B.E., F.B.A. For service to Archaeology.

State of Victoria

- Edith Lilian, Lady Bolte, C.B.E., of Meredith. For outstanding public service to Victoria.

==== Knight Commander of the Order of the British Empire (KBE) ====
- Vice Admiral Ian Stewart McIntosh, C.B., D.S.O., M.B.E., D.S.C.
- Air Vice-Marshal Ralph Coburn Jackson, C.B., Q.H.P., Royal Air Force.
- Sir Robert Alexander Maclean, lately Chairman, Scottish Industrial Estates Corporation. For services to Export.
- The Very Reverend Alan Richardson, D.D, Dean of York. For services to York Minster.
- The Honourable Woldrich Harrison Courtenay, O.B.E., Speaker of the House of Representatives, British Honduras.
- Shapoor Ardeshirji Reporter, O.B E. For services to British interests in Iran.

State of New South Wales

- The Honourable Charles Benjamin Cutler, E.D., Deputy Premier and Minister for Local Government and Highways.

State of Queensland

- The Honourable Mr Justice Mostyn Hanger, Chief Justice of the State of Queensland.

==== Commander of the Order of the British Empire (CBE) ====
- Captain Roger Roland Sutton Fisher, D.S.C., Royal Navy.
- Captain Anthony John Monk, Royal Navy.
- Commodore Derek William Napper, M.B.E.
- Brigadier Francis Henderson Coutts. O.B.E. (193742), late Infantry, Colonel The King's Own Scottish Borderers.
- Colonel Henry Salusbury Legh Dalzell-Payne, O.B E. (408326), late Royal Armoured Corps.
- Brigadier Henri Aloise Decker (371469), Army Catering Corps. Now R.A.R.O.
- Brigadier John David Carew Graham, O.B.E. (243024), late Infantry.
- Colonel Frank Masters, T.D., A.D.C. (282859), late Royal Regiment of Artillery, Territorial and Army Volunteer Reserve.
- Brigadier Oliver McCrea Roome (125179), late Corps of Royal Engineers.
- Brigadier Philip Blencowe Tillard, O.B.E, A.D.C. (232564), late Royal Armoured Corps.
- Brigadier Henry Stuart Ramsay Watson, (255211), late Royal Armoured Corps.
- Air Commodore William Edward Colahan, D.F.C., Royal Air Force.
- Air Commodore John Gingell, M.B.E., Royal Air Force.
- Air Commodore Robert Harold George Weighill, D.F.C., A.D.C., Royal Air Force.
- Acting Air Commodore John Francis Langer, A.F.C., Royal Air Force.
- Group Captain Hubert Desmond Hall, A.F.C., Royal Air Force.
- Group Captain Henry Alan Merriman, A.F.C., Royal Air Force.
- Group Captain Sidney Colin Taylor, Royal Air Force.
- Corrie Pool Beattie. For services to British commercial interests in Thailand.
- William Martin Bennett. For services to British commercial interests and the community in India.
- William Adrian Date. For public services in Grenada.
- The Reverend Lewis Davidson, J.P. For services to education in Jamaica.
- William Barr McKinnon Duncan. For services to British commercial interests in the United States of America.
- Denis Edward Frean, O.B R, British Council Representative, South Africa.
- George Duncan Gordon, D.S.C. For services to British commercial interests and the community in Sri Lanka (Ceylon).
- David Hicks Goodchild. For services to British commercial interests in France.
- Professor Reginald Crawshaw Honeybone, Pro Vice-Chancellor, University of the South Pacific, Fiji.
- Richard Owen Jackson. For services to British commercial interests and the community in India
- Thomas Jamieson, lately Office of the United Nations High Commissioner for Refugees, Geneva
- Professor Charles Stuart Leithead. For services to medicine and education in Ethiopia.
- The Reverend Albert Alfred Frank Lock. For public services and services to the Church in Botswana
- Patrick Joseph Loftus, lately Director, United Nations Statistical Office, New York.
- William John Palmer, lately Judge of Her Majesty's Chief Court for the Persian Gulf.
- Frederick Spencer Pardoe. For services to British commercial interests and the community in Nigeria.
- Eric Geraint Richards, Permanent Secretary, Ministry of Works and Supplies, Malawi.
- Donald Airth Smith, O.B.E., British Council Representative, Pakistan.
- Douglas John Stanley Stevens. For services to British commercial interests in Germany.
- Paul Tsui Ka-cheung, O.B.E., Administrative Officer, Hong Kong.
- The Right Reverend George Cuthbert Manning Woodroffe, Bishop of the Windward Islands.
- George William Young. For services to British interests in South America.

- Edward Penley Abraham, F.R.S., Professor of Chemical Pathology, University of Oxford.
- Percy Albert Allaway, Chairman and Managing Director, Electrical and Musical Industries (Electronics) Ltd.
- Francis John Clarke Amos, City Planning Officer, Liverpool.
- Frank Arthur Arden. For services to agriculture in Lincolnshire.
- Alex Anthony Baker, Director, National Health Service Hospital Advisory Service, Department of Health and Social Security.
- Denby Chadburn Bamford, lately President, Engineering Employers' Federation.
- Owen John Beilby, Chief Agricultural Economist, Department of Agriculture and Fisheries for Scotland.
- Ann Shearer, Mrs. Blofeld, Chairman, Royal National Throat, Nose and Ear Hospital.
- Dennis Ian Cadman, O.B.E. For services to the Royal British Legion.
- George Thomson Cantlay. For political and public services in Wales.
- Charles Francis Carr, H.M. Deputy Chief Inspector of Factories, Department of Employment.
- Windsor Leonard Clarke, Vice-Chairman, Defence, Press and Broadcasting Committee.
- Miss Brenda Gwyneth Stewart Colvin, Senior Partner, Colvin and Moggridge, Landscape Consultants.
- Daniel Cook, lately Chief Education Officer, Devon County Council.
- Clarence Harrington Cooksley, Q.P.M., D.L., Chief Constable, Northumberland Constabulary.
- William Murray Cormie, O.B.E., E.R.D., Senior Partner, Crouch and Hogg, Consulting Engineers, Glasgow.
- Robert Norman Crawford, Chairman, Northern Ireland Transport Holding Company Ltd.
- Colonel The Honourable Charles Guy Cubitt, D.S.O., T.D., D.L. For services to riding.
- Christopher Evelyn Kevill-Davies. For services to the National Health Service.
- Margaret, Mrs. Davies, Chairman, Committee for Wales, Countryside Commission.
- Oswald Davies, D.C.M., Chairman and Managing Director, Leonard Fairclough Ltd.
- Professor George Henry John Daysh. For services to regional development in the North of England.
- Alfred Deutsch, Technical Director, Thorn Electrical Industries Ltd.
- John Lawrence Dickinson, Managing Director, Skefko Ball Bearing Company.
- George Elliott Dodds. For political and public services.
- Ian Donald, M.B.E., Regius Professor of Midwifery, University of Glasgow.
- Stanley Douglas, Member, Local Employment Act Financial Advisory Committee.
- Michael Frederick Dowding, Director, Davy United Engineering Company Ltd. For services to Export.
- John Edmund Bernard Drake, D.S.C., Adviser on Personnel Management, Civil Service Department.
- Robert Bryan Dummett, lately Senior Deputy Chairman and Managing Director, British Petroleum Company Ltd.
- Alexander Charles Durie, Director-General, The Automobile Association.
- Herbert David Eastwood, M.C., Senior Technical Adviser, Ministry of Defence.
- Vero Copner Wynne-Edwards, F.R.S., Regius Professor of Natural History, University of Aberdeen.
- Colonel James Ellis Evans, O.B.E., T.D., Chairman, Wales and Monmouthshire Territorial Auxiliary and Volunteer Reserve Association.
- Henry Robin Romilly Fedden, Deputy Director General, The National Trust.
- Benjamin William Fickling, Consultant Dental Surgeon, St. George's Hospital and Royal Dental Hospital of London.
- Geoffrey Charles Gaut, Director, The Plessey Company Ltd.
- John Brendon George, M.B.E., T.D., Senior Partner, Dixon, Hind and Company.
- James Morris Gifford, Director General, National Ports Council.
- Geoffrey George Gouriet, Chief Engineer, Research and Development, British Broadcasting Corporation.
- Roland Charles Leslie Gregory, Assistant Solicitor, Lord Chancellor's Office.
- Miss Beryl Grey (Beryl Elizabeth, Mrs. Svenson), Artistic Director, London Festival Ballet Company.
- James Michael Harling Grey, T.D., Chairman, Cotton and Allied Textiles Industry Training Board.
- Leander Grunberg, Superintendent, Fluids Group, National Engineering Laboratory, Department of Trade and Industry.
- Edward Irvine Halliday. For services to the Arts.
- Ernest Henry Harman, O.B.E., Chairman, South Western Gas Board.
- Donald Mitchell Healey. For services to the Motor Industry and to Export.
- Geoffrey Fletcher Hickson, Alderman, Cambridge City Council.
- Alexander Hubert Arthur Hogg, Secretary, Royal Commission on Ancient and Historical Monuments in Wales and Monmouthshire.
- Lawrence John Hallam Horner, O.B.E., lately Director, Chamber of Shipping of the United Kingdom.
- Thomas Hourigan, Chairman, Manchester Regional Hospital Board.
- Raymond Illingworth. For services to Cricket.
- Philip Francis Keens, O.B.E., Deputy Chairman, Trustee Savings Banks Association.
- William Raymond Pearce King, Managing Director, The Mint, Birmingham Ltd. For services to Export.
- Bernat Klein, Textile Designer.
- Falk Heinz Kroch, Founder and' Chairman, Lenkro Chemicals Ltd.
- Nicholas Kurti, Professor of Physics, Clarendon Laboratory, University of Oxford.
- Michael Langdon, Singer.
- Robert Clifford Latham, Fellow and Pepys Librarian, Magdalene College, Cambridge.
- Miss Evelyn Laye (Evelyn Elsie, Mrs. Lawton), Actress.
- Aubrey Edwin Orchard-Lisle. For public services.
- The Very Reverend James Boyd Longmuir, T.D., lately Principal Clerk, General Assembly, Church of Scotland.
- Kenneth Charles McKeown, Senior Consultant Surgeon, Darlington and Northallerton Hospital Groups.
- William Murray Mackinlay, Chairman, Board of Management, Glasgow Royal Infirmary.
- John David Ruari McDowall Hardie McLean, D.S.C. For services to Typography.
- John Mair, Assistant Secretary, Board of Customs and Excise.
- Walter Charles Marshall, F.R.S., Member of the United Kingdom Atomic Energy Authority and Director of Research Group.
- Captain Robert Novis Mayo, Elder Brother and Rental Warden, Corporation of Trinity House
- Maurice Nelson Mitchell, T.D. For political services in South West Scotland.
- Leslie William Norfolk, O.B.E., T.D., lately Chief Executive, Dockyards, Ministry of Defence.
- Alexander Edward Libor Parnis, lately Assistant Secretary, University Grants Committee.
- Betty Fraser Ross, Mrs. Paterson, Chairman, Hertfordshire County Council.
- Charles Harry Broughton Pipkin, Managing Director, U.K. Cables Group, British Insulated Callender's Cables Ltd. For services to Export.
- Edward Powell, Chairman, Chloride Group Ltd. For services to Export.
- Leslie Barnett Prince. For public services in the City of London.
- Peter Quennell, Author.
- Kenneth Edward Barren Rae, Secretary, National Theatre Board.
- Donovan Thomas Richnell, Director and Goldsmiths' Librarian, University of London Library.
- William Willis Ruff D.L., Clerk of the Surrey County Council.
- Ronald Henry Salter, lately Assistant Secretary, Department of the Environment.
- William Hinselwood Scaife, Assistant Secretary, Telecommunications Headquarters, Post Office.
- Alan Ure Reith Scroggie, O.B.E., Q.P.M., H.M Inspector of Constabulary.
- William Brian Singleton, Veterinary Surgeon.
- Charles Harry Stanger, Consultant, R. Harry Stanger.
- Francis Staniforth, Managing Director, North of England Newspapers, Darlington.
- William John Strang, Technical Director, Commercial Aircraft Division, British Aircraft Corporation Ltd.
- Major Harold William Tilman, D.S.O., M.C., Mountaineer and Yachtsman.
- Professor Jack Tizard. For services to the study of child development.
- Leslie John Tolley, Chairman, Renold Ltd. For services to Export.
- Major Anthony Richard Turnor. For political and public services in Wessex.
- John Munro Urquhart, Director, Scottish Certificate of Education Examination Board.
- lorwerth John Watkins, Town Clerk, Swansea County Borough Council.
- Miss Grace Elizabeth Watts, lately Chair, General Nursing Council for England and Wales.
- Lewis Gilmour Whyte, Chairman, Transport Holding Company.
- Betty Ann, Lady Baker Wilbraham, For political and public services in the North West.
- Hugh Geoffrey Birch Wilson. For political and public services.
- Harry Francis Wood, O.B.E., Member, National Savings Committee, West Midland Region.
- Arthur Gordon George Young, Headmaster, Northcliffe County High School, Conisbrough, Yorkshire.

==== Officer of the Order of the British Empire (OBE) ====
- Commander Anthony St. Clair Armitage, Royal Navy.
- Commander Richard Ker Slingsby Bethell, Royal Navy.
- Commander Charles Leonard Johnstone-Burt, Royal Navy.
- Commander Clifford Lawson Jordan, Royal Navy.
- Commander John Morton Lee, Royal Navy.
- Commander Basil James Parish, Royal Navy.
- Commander Peter Llewellyn Pennington, Royal Navy.
- Commander Peter Henry Robinson, M.V.O., Royal Navy.
- Commander (MS) Douglas James Lionel Vaughan, Royal Navy.
- Lieutenant-Colonel Anthony Jason Bateman (424257), The Royal Scots Dragoon Guards (Carabiniers and Greys).
- Lieutenant-Colonel John Derek Richardson Bradbeer, T.D. (417871), Royal Regiment of Artillery, Territorial and Army Volunteer Reserve.
- Lieutenant-Colonel (Staff Quartermaster) John Henry Ellicock (447466), Royal Regiment of Artillery.
- Lieutenant-Colonel James Ian Fraser-Orr (368242), The King's Regiment.
- Lieutenant-Colonel David Glazebrook (430309), Royal Tank Regiment.
- Lieutenant-Colonel Harold John Goodson (414864), Corps of Royal Engineers.
- Lieutenant-Colonel (Ordnance Executive Officer) Oliver Wilfred Jacques (422385), Royal Army Ordnance Corps.
- Lieutenant-Colonel (Staff Quartermaster) James Joseph Kelly, M.B.E. (444300), Irish Guards.
- Colonel (Acting) Maurice Vibart McArthur (164527), Army Cadet Force.
- Lieutenant-Colonel Peter Leslie Newth, Corps of Royal Engineers.
- Lieutenant-Colonel John Robert Nicholson, M.B.E. (314211), Intelligence Corps.
- Lieutenant-Colonel (N.M.) Gordon William Norbury (356221), Royal Army Medical Corps. Now Retired.
- Lieutenant-Colonel William John Pryn, M.B. (424601), Royal Army Medical Corps.
- Lieutenant-Colonel Joseph Charles James Rayment (425902), Corps of Royal Electrical and Mechanical Engineers.
- Lieutenant-Colonel The Viscount Slim (388021), The Argyll and Sutherland Highlanders (Princess Louise's). Now R.A.R.O.
- Lieutenant-Colonel (Quartermaster) George Albert Mons Soper, M B.E. (454745), The Royal Scots (The Royal Regiment).
- Lieutenant-Colonel Robert Michael Stewart, T.D. (410998), Royal Corps of Signals, Territorial and Army Volunteer Reserve.
- Lieutenant-Colonel Anthony William Stone, M B E. (311718), Royal Army Ordnance Corps.
- Lieutenant-Colonel John Bradford Timmins, T.D. (438617), Corps of Royal Engineers, Territorial and Army Volunteer Reserve/
- Lieutenant-Colonel Robert Edward Waight (387654), The Light Infantry.
- Wing Commander Vivian Bridges, D F C. (124625), Royal Air Force (for services with the Kenya Air Force.
- Wing Commander Reginald Derek Brittain (4029568), Royal Air Force.
- Wing Commander George Raymond Candy (187225), Royal Air Force.
- Wing Commander Walter Edwards (139202), Royal Air Force (Retired).
- Wing Commander Charles Richard Evans (168107), Royal Air Force.
- Wing Commander Robert Horsley Golightly, D.F.C., A.F.C. (60117), Royal Air Force.
- Wing Commander Gordon Harper (204501), Royal Air Force.
- Wing Commander William John Hurley (55452), Royal Air Force.
- Wing Commander John Alan Porter (609008), Royal Air Force.
- Wing Commander Henry Reed-Purvis (3130527), Royal Air Force Regiment.
- Wing Commander Joseph Quinn (173861), Royal Air Force
- Wing Commander Harry Taswell (186742), Royal Air Force.
- Wing Commander Donald Wood, M.B.E. (182249), Royal Air Force.
- Squadron Leader Gerald William Honey (587537), Royal Air Force.

==== Member of the Order of the British Empire (MBE) ====
- Lieutenant Commander Charles Harry Bulbeck, Royal Navy.
- Lieutenant Commander David Frederick Coath, Royal Navy.
- Lieutenant (CS) Clifford Norman Elworthy, Royal Navy.
- Lieutenant Commander James Scott Goldie, Royal Navy.
- Lieutenant Commander Eric Robert Abraham Johnson, Royal Navy.
- Fleet Chief Communications Yeoman Leslie Murrell, J865384H.
- Lieutenant Commander William Dennis O'Leary, Royal Navy.
- Captain Robert Mervyn Bermingham Otway-Ruthven, Ryal Navy.
- Lieutenant Commander Albert William Arthur Stevens, Royal Navy.
- Lieutenant Commander David Robert Arthur Uden, Royal Navy.
- Instructor Lieutenant Commander Henry Curry Wood, Royal Navy.
- Major Michael John Ealing Adams (433038), Corps of Royal Engineers.
- 23495062 Warrant Officer Class 2 William John Allister, Irish Guards.
- Major Charles James Allman (285389), Royal Corps of Transport.
- Major Benjamin Charles Francaise Arkle (354643), The Parachute Regiment, Territorial and Army Volunteer Reserve.
- 14187264 Warrant Officer Class 2 Alexander McLeary Baird, Small Arms School Corps.
- Captain (Acting) Derek Trelawnay Batson (290488), Army Cadet Force.
- Lieutenant (Quartermaster) Charles Edward Bloor (483714), The Queen's Own Yeomanry, Territorial and Army Volunteer Reserve.
- Major Edward Johnston Mostyn Brett, T.D. (423943), Royal Regiment' of Artillery, Territorial and Army Volunteer Reserve.
- 22652120 Warrant Officer Class 2 Robert Campbell, Special Air Service Regiment.
- Major Hugh Ernest Powell Colley (454999), Royal Regiment of Artillery.
- Captain Richard John Cooper (446425), Corps of Royal Engineers, Territorial and Army Volunteer Rerserve.
- Captain Patricia Margaret Crowe (484311), Women's Royal Army Corps.
- Major Geoffrey Robert Durrant (449376), Royal Army Veterinary Corps.
- 22836870 Warrant Officer Class I John Eman, Royal Army Ordnance Corps.
- Captain (Quartermaster) Douglas George (479991), Royal Corps of Transport.
- Major Reginald Maurice Glanville-Jones (346390), Royal Regiment of Artillery.
- Major Keith John Travers Hoile (397933), The Royal Anglian Regiment.
- Major David Herbert Jenkinson (430346), Royal Regiment of Artillery.
- 22967476 Warrant Officer Class I Michael Kenyon, Royal Corps of Signals.
- 22526602 Warrant Officer Class I (now Lieutenant) Ronald Frederick Knight, Royal Corps of Signals.
- 2230946 Warrant Officer Class 2 Keith Thomas Robert Lane, Corps of Royal Engineers.
- Major (Acting) John Leslie Leaver (361456), Army Cadet Force.
- 22821310 Warrant Officer Class 2 John Dare Luxon, Corps of Royal Electrical and Mechanical Engineers.
- Lieutenant Philip James McGoldrick (494015), The Devonshire and Dorset Regiment.
- 14456842 Warrant Officer Class I (Local) Henry McLaughlin, The Queen's Own Hussars.
- Major Donald William Matheson (467808), Royal Army Educational Corps.
- Captain Norman Macdonald Morse (480436), Coldstream Guards.
- Major David Murray Naylor (453147). Scots Guards.
- 22641307 Warrant Officer Class 2 William Nutter, Royal Regiment of Artillery.
- 22276146 Warrant Officer Class I Bryan Oliver Osmand, The Royal Hussars (Prince of Wales's Own).
- Major Thomas Andrew Peoples (489408), Ulster Defence Regiment.
- Captain (Quartermaster) William George Pettifar (476978), The Royal Regiment of Fusiliers.
- Major Julian John Buckingham Pope (459309), Coldstream Guards.
- Major (Acting) John Gordon Fullerton Potter (315120), Combined Cadet Force.
- 22243509 Warrant Officer Class 2 William Desmond Roger Rees, Royal Corps of Transport, Territorial and Army Volunteer Reserve.
- Major Richard Campbell Rothery (432939), The Royal Irish Rangers (27th (Inniskilling) 83rd and 87th).
- Captain (Quartermaster) John Albert Shuter (479902), Corps of Royal Engineers.
- Major Peter William Stock (408050), Royal Regiment of Artillery.
- Captain Reginald Wallace (479836), Royal Tank Regiment.
- Major Gilroy Edward Lewis, Adjutant British Honduras Volunteer Guard.
- Squadron Leader Derek Carmichael Adams (4028377), Royal Air Force.
- Squadron Leader David Wiliam Brinley Chippington (2473152), Royal Air Force.
- Squadron Leader Frederick Arthur Ernest Cramp (46424), Royal Air Force.
- Squadron Leader Samuel Anderson Curtis (4000987), Royal Air Force.
- Squadron Leader Brian William Dennis (609100), Royal Air Force.
- Squadron Leader Brian David Everett (3517813), Royal Air Force.
- Squadron Leader Monica Fawcett (479042), Royal Air Force.
- Squadron Leader Albert Percy Naylor Finter (519499), Royal Air Force (for services with the Kenya Air Force)
- Squadron Leader John Alexander Fleming (49397), Royal Air Force.
- Squadron Leader Ian Forbes, D.F.C. (137197), Royal Air Force.
- Squadron Leader John Nicol Macdonald (178091), Royal Air Force.
- Squadron Leader Geoffrey Milbanke Phillips (1892575), Royal Air Force.
- Squadron Leader Graham Ralph Pitchfork (608074), Royal Air Force.
- Squadron Leader Robert John Roberts (607323), Royal Air Force.
- Squadron Leader John Cleathero Simpson (500785), Royal Air Force Regiment.
- Squadron Leader George William Steer (654618), Royal Air Force.
- Acting Squadron Leader John Antony Charlett-Green (681836), Royal Air Force.
- Flight Lieutenant Francis Roy Brawn (551952), Royal Air Force.
- Flight Lieutenant Clive Learmonth (4081712) Royal Air Force.
- Flight Lieutenant Norman Graham Orange (5028238), Royal Air Force.
- Flight Lieutenant David Alan Slatter (4096839), Royal Air Force.
- Acting Flight Lieutenant Walter Charles Hutchinson, D.F.C. (134112), Royal Air Force Volunteer Reserve (Training Branch).
- Warrant Officer John Alexander Clargo (W3025841), Royal Air Force.
- Warrant Officer George Albert Hobbs (L0570080), Royal Air Force.
- Warrant Officer Richard Stenton, B.E.M. (H1822882), Royal Air Force.
- Warrant Officer Bernard Travers Taylor (X0615381), Royal Air Force.
- Warrant Officer Peter Taylor (H4033686), Royal Air Force Regiment.
- Warrant Officer Alfred Douglas Vance (LI795939), Royal Air Force.
- Warrant Officer Cyril Walmsley (T0645530), Royal Air Force.
- Master Air Electronics Operator William Stodart Young McGuire (W2580583), Royal Air Force.

=== Order of the Companions of Honour (CH) ===
- Sir Robert Mayer. For services to Music.
- The Right Honourable Duncan Edwin Sandys, M.P. For political and public services.
