= Ernest Sloman =

Rev. Ernest Sloman (bapt. 24 December 1854 – 5 July 1918) was an Anglican clergyman who was Dean of St George's Cathedral, Georgetown, Guyana from 1910 until his death in 1918.

Sloman was born in Farnham, Surrey, the fourth son of Samuel George Sloman, a surgeon, and Catherine Mary Sloman. He was educated at St Edmund Hall, Oxford, receiving his BA in 1877 and MA in 1880. He was ordained in 1878, after a Curacy at South Hackney he emigrated to Guyana where he was successively Curate at Christ Church Georgetown, Principal of the Belair Training Institute, Rural Dean of Berbice and a Cathedral Canon before his appointment to the Diocese's Deanery.

Church of England titles
Preceded by Emil George Henry Caswell	Deans of St George's Cathedral, Georgetown; 1910 – 1918	Succeeded by Edward Archibald Parry
