= Henry Parry (bishop of Perth) =

Anglican bishop in Perth, Western Australia

The Right Reverend Henry Parry
- Bishop of Perth
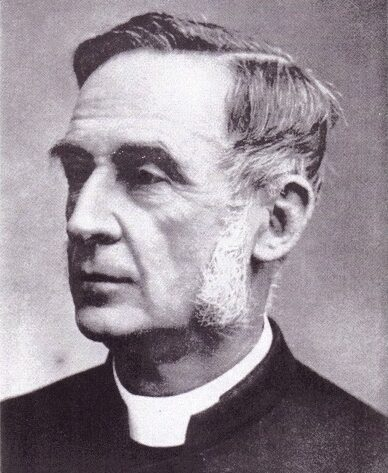
- Church: Church of England
- Diocese: Perth
- In office: 1876–1893
- Predecessor: Mathew Hale
- Successor: Charles Riley
- Previous posts: Archdeacon, Vicar general and Coadjutor bishop of Barbados

Orders
- Ordination: 1852 (as priest)
- Consecration: 15 November 1868

Personal details
- Born: Henry Hutton Parry; 18 December 1826 Antigua
- Died: 15 November 1893 (aged 66) Perth, Western Australia
- Denomination: Anglican
- Parents: Thomas Parry; Louisa, née Hutton
- Spouse: Elizabeth Mary, née Thomas (died 1877); Mary Suzanna, née Leake (m. 1879)
- Children: 3 from first marriage; 3 from second marriage
- Education: Rugby School
- Alma mater: Balliol College, Oxford; University of Durham

Henry Hutton Parry (18 December 1826 – 15 November 1893) was a bishop of the Church of England. He was consecrated co-adjutor bishop in Barbados in 1868. He was translated to Perth to become the second Bishop of the Anglican Diocese of Perth, a position held from 1876 to 1893.

== Early life ==
He was born in Antigua, the second son of Thomas Parry and Louisa Hutton. Educated at Rugby School, he entered Balliol College, Oxford, (B.A., 1851; M.A., 1859), and the University of Durham (D.D., 1876).

In 1884 he decided to open a Girls' College in Perth and he employed the Tasmanian teacher Amy Jane Best to be the headmistress. The Girls' College was a boarding school that was short-lived. His boarding school closed after four years because of finance. The now unemployed headmistress opened the Central School for Girls in the following year.

Parry is noted as the driving force for the construction of St George's Cathedral, Perth, which was consecrated on 15 November 1888 by the Bishop of Sydney, Alfred Barry. He died in Perth, Western Australia.

== Family ==
Parry was married to Mary Susannah Leake, eldest daughter of George Walpole Leake.

Anglican Communion titles
Preceded by Mathew Hale	Bishops of Perth; 1876–1893	Succeeded by Charles Riley
