= Rufus Brome =

Barbadian bishop

Rufus Theophilus Brome was the 12th Bishop of Barbados.

== Biography ==
Born the son of Leon Brome (1893–1958) and his wife Constance Griffith (1898–1985) in 1935 and educated at Codrington College, he was ordained Deacon in 1961 and Priest a year later. He was Curate of St George's Saint Kitts until 1966 when he became Rector of St Bartholomew, Antigua. After another incumbency in Antigua at St Martin's he moved to Barbados where he was successively rector of Holy Trinity and then St Peter's, archdeacon of the island.

On 22 July 1992, after his two-hour-long Induction, Enrollment and Enthronement service followed by an hour long Ordination and Consecration on the Feast of Saint Mary Magdalene from 8:00 a.m. at the then newly renovated Cathedral Church of St. Michael he was finally, made its first Black diocesan bishop and head of the then 80,000 member diocese. The island's top organist of more than 40 years John George Fletcher planned a special programme with his choir for all the services which were officiated by the cathedral's Dean and Chapter, with arrangements by then Precentor, Michael Clarke including ushers from the six main Anglican churches of St. Mary's, St. Paul's, St. Peter's, Holy Trinity, St. Matthias, as well as St. Michael's. His brother Henderson L. Brome of the St. Cyprian's Episcopal Church, Boston (Roxbury), MA was invited to speak. All the services themselves were broadcast and recorded by the island's local television network Caribbean Broadcasting Corporation.

He began his first episcopate the following Sunday evening with an appeal for unity among Christian churches on the island. In the sermon he said the credibility of the church had been hurt by "disunity and rivalry" among the various denominations. "Instead of merely coming together once a year to pray for unity, we must demonstrate unity", referring to the annual observance of Christian unity week, he called for dialogue among congregations of the various churches to discover what they had in common, saying "such communication and consultation will enable us to dispel ignorance and to remove the misconceptions which we hold of one another." The new chief pastor advocated that Christians in the diocese adopt a more activist role in the society. The 16 page sermon called "Developing a Society on the Foundation of the Family" was published in 1994 by Caribbean Development Bank.

Brome retired as Bishop, to spend more time with his wife and four children, in January 2000 at which time the position of Bishop was taken up by John Holder.

Since 2004 Brome has been attached to St. James Parish Church, Barbados as assistant to the Rector. Celebrating the fiftieth anniversary of his ordination to the diaconate on 21 December 2011, when he also published his first book "Preaching In and Out of Season", a compilation of sermons covering the various church seasons as well as special occasions in the church and community and difficult subjects.

Anglican Communion titles
Preceded by Drexel Wellington Gomez	Bishop of Barbados; 1992 – 2000	Succeeded by John Walder Dunlop Holder
