= John Young (Dean of St George's Cathedral) =

The Very Reverend John Kenneth Young (5 January 1914 – 15 June 1991) was the Dean of St George's Cathedral, Georgetown, Guyana from 1948 until 1957. Born in 1914, he was educated at Clare College, Cambridge, ordained in 1939 after a period of study at Ripon College Cuddesdon and began his career with curacies at St James, West Hartlepool and St Mary Magdalen, Medomsley. From 1943 to 1948 he was vicar of Demerara River, Guyana and then Dean of the Diocese's Cathedral. Returning to England he held incumbencies at Harton, North Yorkshire, Eastgate, County Durham and (his final post before retirement) Forcett, Richmondshire. Young died in Darlington, County Durham in June 1991 at the age of 77.

== Notes ==
Church of England titles
Preceded by Frank Thatcher	Deans of St George's Cathedral, Georgetown; 1948 – 1957	Succeeded by Ronald Ragsdale Sargison
