= Edward Parry (bishop of Dover) =

Edward Parry (14 January 1830 – 11 April 1890) was a Bishop of Dover.

Parry was the son of William Parry, Arctic explorer, and Isabella Louisa, his wife, fourth daughter of the John Stanley, 1st Baron Stanley of Alderley.

Parry was educated at Rugby School and Balliol College, Oxford and began his ordained ministry as a curate in Norham. After time as chaplain to the Bishop of London, Archibald Campbell Tait, he became Rural Dean of Ealing. In 1869 he was appointed Archdeacon of Canterbury and on the Feast of the Annunciation, 25 March 1870, was consecrated at Lambeth Palace chapel the fourth Bishop of Dover (suffragan bishop in the Diocese of Canterbury), 273 years after the death of the third bishop. A monument to him is in Canterbury Cathedral. In 1882 he was chosen by the Australian bishops to succeed the late Frederic Barker as Bishop of Sydney and Metropolitan of Australia, but he declined the nomination.

Parry's sons, Edward and Sydney were, respectively, Bishop of Guyana (1900–1921) & Archbishop of the West Indies (1917–1921), and a senior British civil servant. Sydney wrote the article about his father in the Dictionary of National Biography. Another son was Admiral Sir John Franklin Parry, Hydrographer of the Navy during the First World War.

Church of England titles
Preceded by In abeyance	Bishop of Dover; 1870–1890	Succeeded by Rodney Eden
