= Edward Parry (archbishop of the West Indies) =

Anglican colonial bishop (1861–1943)

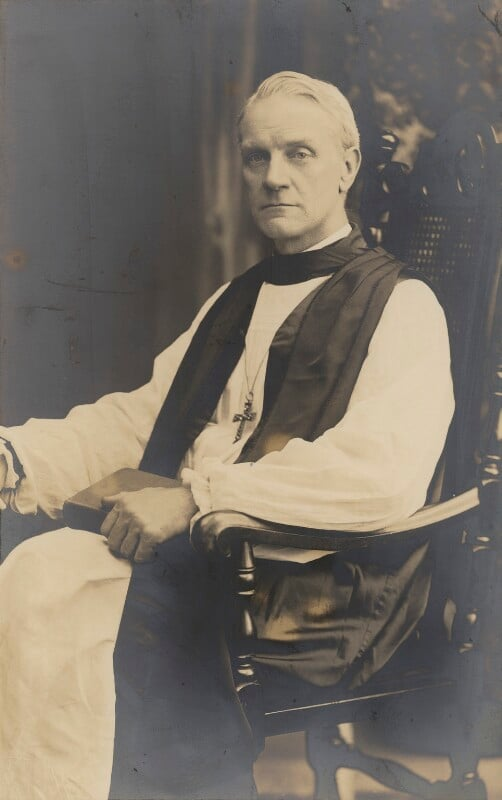
Parry, c. 1910s

Edward Archibald Parry (1861–1943) was Bishop of Guyana from 1900 until 1921 and Archbishop of the West Indies from 1916 until 1921.

Parry was born into an eminent family, his father was Edward Parry, Bishop of Dover, and his grandfather was William Parry, Arctic explorer. He was educated at Winchester and Oriel College, Oxford, and ordained in 1884.

After a curacy at St Mary, Acton and a period as bishop's chaplain to Anthony Thorold, Bishop of Rochester, he was Rector of Sundridge, Kent and Vicar of St Mark, New Milverton, Leamington before his appointment to the episcopate. He was nominated Bishop of Guyana in late 1900, and consecrated bishop by Frederick Temple, Archbishop of Canterbury, in Canterbury Cathedral on 28 December 1900. From the death of his cathedral's dean in 1918 onwards, he was additionally dean of the cathedral, an arrangement which continued until 1937.

Anglican Communion titles
Preceded by Proctor Swaby	Bishop of Guyana; 1900–1921	Succeeded by Oswald Parry
Preceded by Ernest Sloman	Deans of St George's Cathedral, Georgetown; 1918–1921	Succeeded by Oswald Parry
Preceded by Enos Nuttall	Archbishop of the West Indies; 1916–1921	Succeeded by Edward Hutson
