= Drexel Gomez =

Bahamian Anglican bishop (1937–2025)

The Most Reverend Drexel Gomez
- Archbishop Emeritus of the Church in the Province of the West Indies
- Church: Church in the Province of the West Indies
- See: Bahamas
- In office: 1997–2009
- Previous post: Bishop of Barbados (1992-1997)

Orders
- Ordination: 1959
- Consecration: 1972

Personal details
- Born: 24 January 1937 Berry Islands, Bahamas
- Died: 14 October 2025 (aged 88) The Bahamas
- Denomination: Anglicanism

Drexel Wellington Gomez (24 January 1937 – 14 October 2025) was a Bahamian Anglican bishop.

== Biography ==
Gomez was born on the Berry Islands in the Bahamas on 24 January 1937. He graduated from St Chad's College, Durham University, in 1959. He was enthroned and consecrated as Lord Bishop of Barbados at the Cathedral Church of St. Michael on 25 June 1972. In 1997 he was elected bishop of the Diocese of The Bahamas and the Turks and Caicos Islands.

He was elected Archbishop and Primate of the Province of the West Indies in 1996. His full title became "His Grace the Most Reverend Drexel Wellington Gomez, Lord Archbishop, Metropolitan and Primate of the Church of the West Indies & Bishop of the Diocese Of Nassau & The Bahamas" (including the Turks & Caicos Islands).

Along with Archbishop Peter Akinola, Anglican Primate of Nigeria, Gomez was a leading opponent of the ordination of non-celibate gay people as Anglican clergy. This issue escalated into a crisis for the Anglican Communion following the consecration of an openly non-celibate gay priest, Gene Robinson, as the Bishop of New Hampshire in the United States in 2003.

In October 2003, Gomez was appointed to the Lambeth Commission on Communion by the Archbishop of Canterbury, Rowan Williams. The commission produced the Report of the Lambeth Commission on Communion (also known as the Windsor Report and the Eames Report), published in October 2004.

In August 2007, Gomez was the main preacher at a service at which several Anglican archbishops consecrated two American priests as bishops despite the opposition of the Episcopal Church in the United States of America. Gomez accused the American church of "aggressive revisionist theology" and teaching lies.

Gomez retired in 2009. He died from stomach cancer in The Bahamas, on 14 October 2025, at the age of 88. His tomb is outside of St Agnes Anglican Church in Nassau.

== Works ==
=== Liturgical works ===
- D. W. Gomez (contributor), A companion to the 1975 experimental rite for the celebration of the Holy Eucharist: prepared for experimental use in the Province of the West Indies / the Provincial Liturgical Commission, the Church in the Province of the West Indies. (1976)
- D. W. Gomez (ed.), True Union in the Body? A contribution to the discussion within the Anglican Communion concerning the public blessing of same-sex unions (Oxford, 2002), p. 3.

Anglican Communion titles
Preceded by Lewis Evans	Bishop of Barbados; 1972–1992	Succeeded by Rufus Brome
Preceded by Orland Lindsay	Primate of the West Indies; 1997–2009	Succeeded by John Holder
