= Prelate of the Order of St Michael and St George =

This is a list of those clergymen who have served as Prelate of the Order of St Michael and St George, the British order of chivalry associated with foreign and Commonwealth service.

- 1877: George Augustus Selwyn, Bishop of Lichfield and former Bishop of New Zealand
- 1878: Charles Perry, former Bishop of Melbourne
- 1891: William Piercy Austin, Bishop of British Guiana and Primate of the West Indies
- 1893: Robert Machray, Bishop of Rupert's Land
- 1905: Henry Hutchinson Montgomery, former Bishop of Tasmania
- 1933: St Clair George Alfred Donaldson, Bishop of Salisbury and former archbishop of Brisbane
- 1936: Michael Bolton Furse, Bishop of St Albans and former Bishop of Pretoria
- 1951: Wilfred Marcus Askwith, Bishop of Blackburn and former Chaplain to Europeans at Nakuru
- 1963: John Leonard Wilson, Bishop of Birmingham and former Bishop of Singapore
- 1971: Robert Wilmer Woods, Bishop of Worcester and former Archdeacon of Singapore
- 1989: Simon Barrington-Ward, Bishop of Coventry
- 2005: David Andrew Urquhart, Bishop of Birmingham
