= Diocese of Barbados =

Anglican diocese in the West Indies

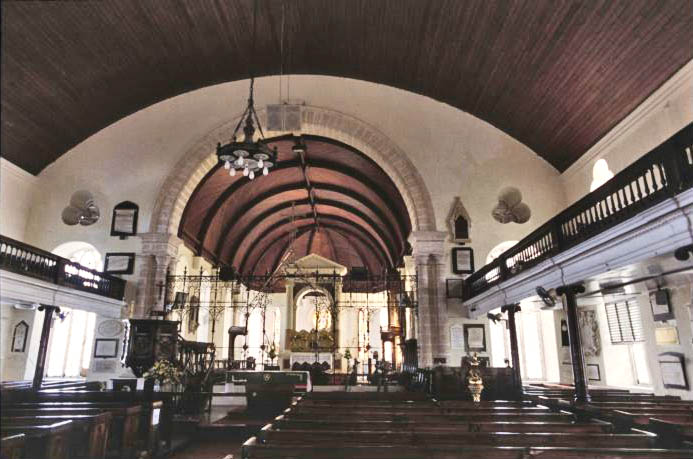
Interior of St Michael's Cathedral

The Diocese of Barbados is one of eight dioceses of the Anglican Communion that is part of the Province of the West Indies.

== History ==
The diocese was established in 1824 as one of a pair, the other being the Diocese of Jamaica, which covered the whole Caribbean. Before that, the area was nominally part of the Bishop of London's responsibility, a situation that had been assumed to hold from 1660 onwards. The Bishops of London were regarded as having responsibility for the churches in the colonies in the early seventeenth century; but it was not until 1675 that a Bishop of London formally undertook that task, making recommendations through the Board for Trade and Plantations. His involvement resulted in clergy being part of the vestries for the first time in 1681. Prior to 1824, the functions of the Bishop of London were limited to ordaining those candidates who presented themselves, and licensing Clergy. The appointment of bishops provided coordination for the work of the Church in each diocese. Efforts which depended on the will of each minister, now came to be part of a strategy for the whole diocese. A major component of this strategy was the religious instruction of Negro slaves in Barbados. The following address was unanimously agreed to at a meeting of the Clergy of the Island of Barbados on Tuesday the 5th day of August, 1823: “The Clergy of Barbados, sensible of the benefits which must result to any society from extending religious Instruction to every member of it feel themselves called upon at this moment to submit to the country at large, some plan for the instruction of the Slave Population in the saving of truths of the Christian Religion and in moral virtue, as their best and only foundation of any improvement in their civil and moral condition. They look with confidence to the cordial cooperation of every enlighten Master: and the soil which they have to work upon is so improved by the fostering care and indulgent treatment of the owner to its slaves, that they are sanguine in the hope of reaping the fruits of their labors at a very distant day." Also included in the Clergy's address is their statement announcing the principle objective of religious instruction to the Negro slaves of Barbados, “In the second place, where the right of the Master over the slave is absolute, it is next to impossible to attempt the work of conversion on the latter without the aid of the former.”

In 1813, the then Bishop of London denied it was his responsibility, and so it turned out that appointments to the Church in the Colonies were recommended by the local governor, in this case of the Leeward Islands.

The Barbados diocese initially also covered Trinidad, British Guiana, the Leeward Islands and the Windward Islands. It was later divided on the retirement in 1841/2 of the first Bishop: his three Archdeacons took charge as the Bishop of Antigua (covering the Leeward Islands) (Daniel Gateward Davis), of Barbados (including Trinidad and the Windward Islands) (Parry) and the Bishop of British Guiana (William Piercy Austin). In 1842 (after division), her jurisdiction was described as "Trinidad, St Vincent, Grenada, Carriacou, Tobago, St Lucia". In 1866, there were two archdeaconries: H. H. Parry was Archdeacon of Barbados and George Cummins of Trinidad.

The Cathedral Church of Saint Michael and All Angels (formerly St. Michael's Parish Church), is located in the centre of Bridgetown, Barbados. Originally consecrated in 1665, and then rebuilt in 1789, it was elevated to Cathedral status in 1825 with the appointment of William Coleridge as bishop of the newly created Diocese of Barbados and the Leeward Islands.

The bishop's official residence was located at Bishop's Court Hill along Upper Colleymore Rock Road (Highway 6).

There is also a Roman Catholic diocese based in Barbados, the Roman Catholic Diocese of Bridgetown.

== List of Anglican Bishops of Barbados ==
Tenure	Incumbent	Notes
1824–1842	William Coleridge	(1789–1849)
1842–1869	Thomas Parry	(1795–1870)
1873–1877	John Mitchinson	(1833–1918; as Bishop of Barbados & the Windward Islands from 1877)

== List of Anglican Bishops of Barbados & the Windward Islands ==
Tenure	Incumbent	Notes
1877–1881	John Mitchinson	(1833–1918)
1882–1899	Herbert Bree	(1828–1899)
1900–1916	Proctor Swaby	(1844–1916)
1917–1927	Alfred Berkeley	(1862–1938; as Bishop of Barbados and the Windward Islands; afterwards see Bishop of the Windward Islands, 1927)

== List of Anglican Bishops of Barbados (Cont'd) ==
Tenure	Incumbent	Notes
1927–1945	David Bentley	(1882–1970)
1945–1951	James Hughes	(1894–1979)
1951–1960	Gay Mandeville	(1894–1969)
1960–1972	Lewis Evans	(1904–1996)
1972–1992	Drexel Gomez	(1939−2025)
1992–1999	Rufus Brome	(born 1934)
2000–2018	John Holder	(born 1948)
2018–present	Michael Maxwell	(born 1971)

== See also ==
- Bishoprics, etc., in West Indies Act 1842
- Religion in Barbados
