= Proctor Swaby =

- Bishop of Barbados and the Windward Islands
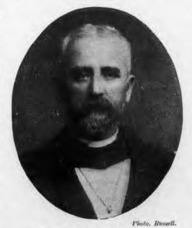
- Diocese: Diocese of Barbados &; Diocese of the Windward Islands
- In office: 1899–1916 (d.)
- Predecessor: Herbert Bree
- Successor: Alfred Berkeley
- Other post: Bishop of Guyana (1893–1899)

Orders
- Consecration: 1893 by Edward White Benson (Canterbury)

Personal details
- Born: 1844 Tetney, Lincolnshire, UK
- Died: 16 November 1916 (aged 71–72)
- Denomination: Anglican
- Occupation: bishop
- Education: Durham University

William Proctor Swaby FRGS (1844 – 16 November 1916) was a colonial Anglican bishop from 1893 until 1916.

Born in Tetney, Swaby was educated at Durham University, where he won the Barry Scholarship. He eventually gained a doctorate in Divinity He held incumbencies at Castletown, Sunderland and at Milfield before being ordained to the episcopate in 1893 as Bishop of Guyana. He was consecrated a bishop on 24 March 1893, by Edward White Benson, Archbishop of Canterbury, at Westminster Abbey.

In Guyana he encouraged the development of a Third Order of Saint Francis within the Anglican church based on the work by Emily Marshall. She was his sister-in-law and she had been an assistant from when he was in Sunderland. Swaby's archdeacon Fortunato Pietro Luigi Josa published St. Francis of Assisi and the Third Order in the Anglo-Catholic Church in 1898 in England quoting text from the order's founder but without naming her. The idea grew and when Swaby was Translated to Barbados and the Windward Islands in December 1899/1900 then the new order quickly took hold.

Swaby held the two separate Sees of Barbados and of the Windward Islands together. He died in post in 1916.

Swaby was a Fellow of the Colonial Institute and the Royal Microscopical Society.

Anglican Communion titles
Preceded by William Austin	Bishop of Guyana; 1893–1899	Succeeded by Edward Parry
Preceded by Herbert Bree	Bishop of Barbados and the Windward Islands; 1899–1916	Succeeded by Alfred Berkeley
