= Alfred Berkeley (bishop) =

English bishop (1862–1938)

Berkeley in 1925.

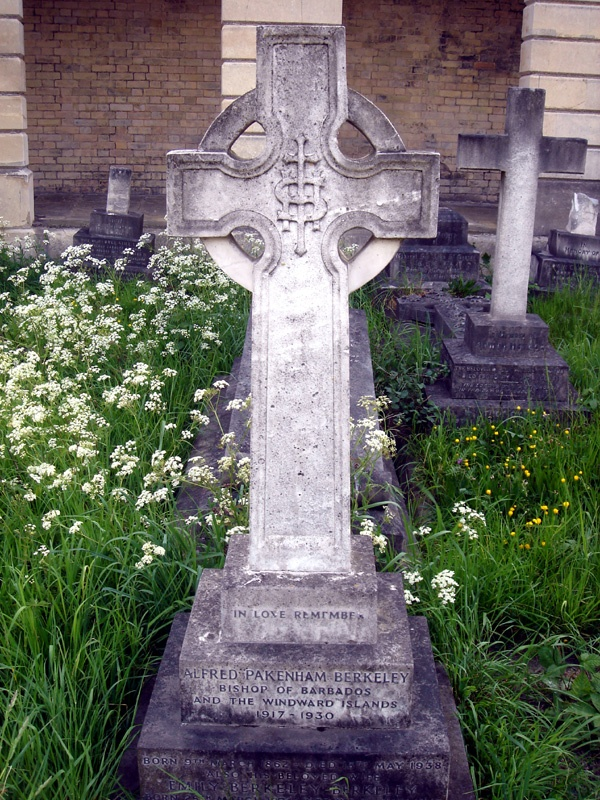
Funerary monument, Brompton Cemetery, London

Alfred Pakenham Berkeley (9 March 1862 – 15 May 1938) was an English divine: Bishop of Barbados and the Windward Islands from 1917 to 1927; and Bishop of the Windward Islands from 1927 to 1930.

Alfred Berkeley was the son of R. Fitzharding Berkeley, rector of Saint Philip, Barbados and canon. Educated at Harrison College and Codrington College, he was ordained deacon 1885 and priest in 1886. He became curate of Saint George, Antigua and Barbuda. In 1887 he became vicar of All Saints, Antigua and Barbuda, and in 1888 curate of Saint Philip, Barbados. From 1891 to 1901 he was vicar of Holy Innocents, Barbados. Rector of Saint Philip from 1901 to 1907 and dean and rector of Saint Michael, Barbados from 1907 to 1917, Berkeley was elected to be bishop and was consecrated in St. Michael's Cathedral, Barbados on 12 August 1917.

On his retirement as Bishop of Barbados and the Windward Islands in 1927 he was elected as the first bishop of the Diocese of the Windward Islands, which since its formation in 1877 had been administered by the Bishop of Barbados. He was also appointed Rector of St George's Cathedral in Kingstown, St Vincent.

He is buried in Brompton Cemetery, London.

Anglican Communion titles
Preceded by Proctor Swaby	Bishop of Barbados and the Windward Islands; 1917–1927	Succeeded by David Bentley
New title	Bishop of the Windward Islands; 1927–1930	Succeeded by Vibert Jackson
