= Cuthbert Woodroffe =

Sir George Cuthbert Manning Woodroffe KBE (known as Cuthbert; 17 May 1918 - 29 November 2012) was an Anglican Archbishop of the Province of the West Indies. He was a long serving Anglican Bishop of the Windward Islands from 1969 until 1986. For the last six years of that period, he served as Archbishop, Primate of the Anglican Church, Province of the West Indies.

He was born on 17 May 1918 in Grenada and was educated at the Grenada Boys Grammar School. He received his tertiary education at Codrington College, Barbados and was ordained in 1945. His first post was as a curate in St Vincent He held incumbencies in Barbados. His last post before appointment to the episcopate saw him returning to St Vincent as Sub-Dean of its cathedral. He was consecrated a bishop on 29 September 1969 by Alan Knight.

Woodroffe was appointed a Commander of the Order of the British Empire (CBE) in the 1973 New Year Honours, and promoted to Knight Commander of the Order (KBE) in the 1980 Birthday Honours.

Anglican Communion titles
Preceded by Harold Piggott	Bishop of the Windward Islands; 1969 – 1986	Succeeded by Philip Elder
Preceded by Alan Knight	Primate of the West Indies; 1979 – 1986	Succeeded by Orland Lindsay
