= Terry Davis (priest) =

Guyanese Anglican dean

Terry Davis is the dean of St George's Cathedral, Georgetown, Guyana. He is the 17th person to hold the post.

== Notes ==
Church of England titles
Preceded by Oswald Fitz Burnell Trellis	Deans of St George's Cathedral, Georgetown; 2002 –	Succeeded by Current Incumbent
