= James Clement (disambiguation) =

James Clement (born 1976) is an Australian rules footballer.

James Clement may also refer to:

- James Clement (priest) (fl. 1950–1983), Anglican Dean of St George's Cathedral, Georgetown, Guyana
- James Clement (entrepreneur), American lawyer, entrepreneur, and transhumanist
- James Clement (born 1977), three-time Survivor contestant, appearing in the China, Micronesia (Fans vs. Favorites), and Heroes vs. Villains seasons

== See also ==
- James Clement Dunn (1890–1979), American diplomat
- James Clements (disambiguation)
