= Gay Mandeville =

Gay Lisle Griffith Mandeville (20 May 1894 – 19 July 1969) was the first native-born Bishop of Barbados from 1951 until 1960.

He was educated at Harrison College and Codrington College, Barbados. After graduation, he was ordained in 1918 and began his ecclesiastical career with a curacy at St George, St Kitts followed by the post of Rector of Saba in what was then the Dutch West Indies and is now a special municipality of the Netherlands. He then returned to his home country where he was successively Vicar of St Bartholomew then St Stephen; Rector of St Philip (1943–1950), Vicar General (1948–1951) and Dean (1950–1951) and finally Bishop of Barbados.

Anglican Communion titles
| Preceded by James Hughes | Bishop of Barbados; 1951–1960 | Succeeded by Lewis Evans |
