= Philip the Elder =

Philip the Elder may refer to:

- Philip I, Count of Hanau-Lichtenberg
- Philip I, Count of Katzenelnbogen

== See also ==
- Philip Elder
