= Ronald Sargison =

Ronald Ragsdale Sargison AKC (10 November 1910 – 16 October 1987) was the Dean of St George's Cathedral, Georgetown, Guyana from 1957 to 1961.

Born in 1910, he was ordained in 1932 after a period of study at Wells Theological College and began his career with curacies at St. Catharine's Church, Nottingham, and St. Martin's Church, Sherwood. From 1942 to 1946 he was a Chaplain to the Forces. In 1947 he was appointed Priest in Charge of St. John the Evangelist, Carrington after which he was Vicar of Kneesall and then Ossington, a post he held until his appointment to the Deanery of St George's Cathedral Georgetown, Guyana. Returning to England he held incumbencies at Balham, Hawthorn, County Durham and (his final post) Trimdon. He died in 1987 in Scarborough, Yorkshire, aged 76.

== Notes ==
Church of England titles
Preceded by John Kenneth Young	Deans of St George's Cathedral, Georgetown; 1957–1961	Succeeded by Geoffrey Charles Cates
