= Oswald Parry =

English bishop

Oswald Hutton Parry was Bishop of Guyana from 1921 until 1936. Born into an eminent ecclesiastical family, he was educated at Charterhouse and Magdalen College, Oxford. After a curacy at St Ignatius, Sunderland he was appointed Head of Archbishop's Mission to the Assyrian Christians. From 1907 until 1921 he was Vicar of All Hallows East India Docks when he ascended to the Colonial Episcopate. A significant author, he died on 28 August 1936.

== Notes ==
Church of England titles
Preceded by Edward Archibald Parry	Deans of St George's Cathedral, Georgetown; 1921 – 1937	Succeeded by William James Hughes
Preceded by Edward Archibald Parry	Bishop of Guyana; 1921 – 1937	Succeeded by Alan John Knight
