= Frank Thatcher =

Frank Thatcher was the Dean of St George's Cathedral, Georgetown, Guyana from 1944 to 1948. Educated at Fitzwilliam College, Cambridge, he was ordained in 1914 and began his career with curacies at Holy Trinity, Hastings and St Mary the Less, Cambridge. In 1917 he returned to his old college as Chaplain and Bursar leaving in 1924 to become Rector of Letchworth, a post he held until his elevation to the Deanery at Georgetown, Guyana. A man who brought "his proficiency as a teacher and an examiner" to the post", he resigned in 1948.

== Notes ==
Church of England titles
| Preceded by William James Hughes | Deans of St George's Cathedral, Georgetown; 1944 – 1948 | Succeeded by John Kenneth Young |
