= Alan Knight (bishop) =

Anglican archbishop of the West Indies

Alan John Knight CMG (also rendered inaccurately as John Alan Knight; 1904 – 29 November 1979) was a long serving Bishop of Guyana from 1937 until his death; and for much of that time Archbishop of the West Indies.

== Background ==
He was educated at Owens School and Cambridge University and ordained in 1926. He was chaplain at University College School and then curate at St James', Enfield Highway after which he was Headmaster of Adisadel College. In 1937, he was appointed to the episcopate; he was consecrated a bishop on St Peter's Day 1937 (29 June), by Cosmo Lang, Archbishop of Canterbury, at St Paul's Cathedral. A Sub-Prelate of the Order of St John of Jerusalem and prominent Freemason, he died in post on 29 November 1979, having become a Doctor of Divinity (DD).

Anglican Communion titles
Preceded by Oswald Parry	Bishop of Guyana; 1937–1979	Succeeded by Randolph George
Preceded by William Hardie	Primate of the West Indies; 1951–1979	Succeeded by Cuthbert Woodroffe
