= Austin House (Guyana) =

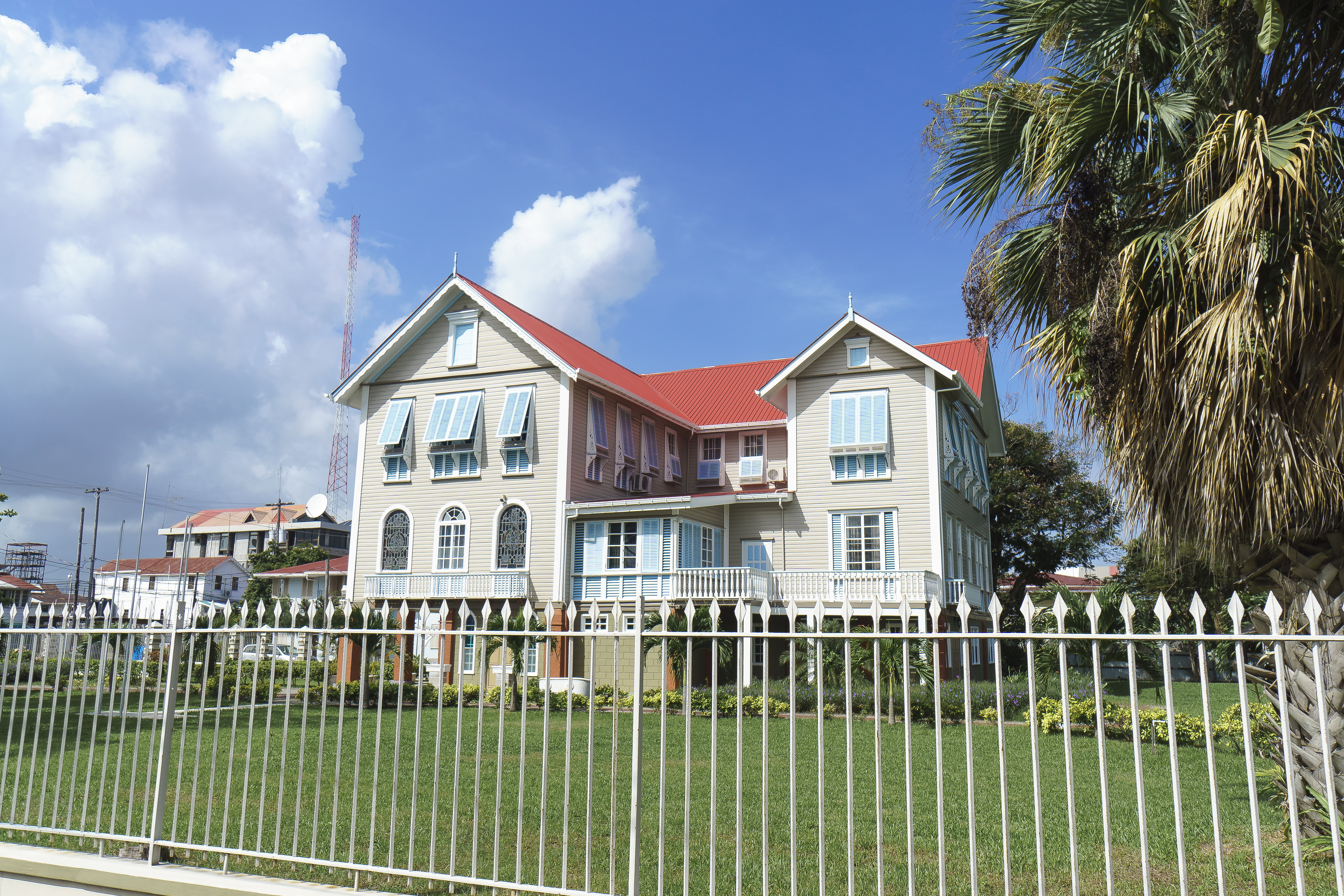

- Location within Guyana

General information
- Location: Kingston, Georgetown, Guyana
- Coordinates: 6.82235°N 58.16335°W
- Completed: 5 October 1894
- Client: Anglican Diocese of Guyana

Technical details
- Material: Wood

Design and construction
- Architect: John Bradshaw Sharples

Austin House (also Bishop’s Court) located in Georgetown, is the official residence of the Anglican Bishop of Guyana. The building is named after William Piercy Austin, the first Anglican bishop of Guyana.

== Overview ==
The original residence for the bishop was a U-shaped building constructed in 1842, and was named Kingston House. In 1892, it was renamed Austin House in honour of William Piercy Austin, the first Anglican bishop of Guyana. The building fell into disrepair and was demolished in 1894.

On 5 October 1894, the new building was completed. The Austin House is a wooden building with two steep roofs and Demerara windows. In 1930, the ground floor was enclosed to enlarge office space. In 1950, two stained glass windows were installed over the main entrance. One window contains the arms of the dioceses of London and Canterbury, and the other the arms of the dioceses of Guyana and Barbados. Austin House was restored in 2012.

In 1998, Guyana started a procedure to nominate Georgetown as a UNESCO World Heritage Site. Austin House was one of the 13 monuments selected for inclusion, however the nomination ran into difficulties due to inadequate legislation to protect the monuments. As of 2021, Guyana is not listed.
