= Archbishop Gomez =

Archbishop Gomez may refer to:

- Drexel Gomez (born 1937), former Archbishop of the West Indies
- José Horacio Gómez (born 1951), Archbishop of Los Angeles
- Rubén Salazar Gómez (born 1942), Cardinal Archbishop of Bogotá
