= William Coleridge =

Barbadian bishop (1789–1849)

The Right Reverend William Coleridge
- Bishop of Barbados
- Diocese: Diocese of Barbados
- Installed: 1824
- Term ended: 1842

Personal details
- Born: William Hart Coleridge; 27 June 1789
- Died: 20 December 1849 (aged 60) Salston, Ottery St Mary, Devon, England
- Spouse: Eldest daughter of Thomas Rennell (m. 1825)
- Children: 2
- Education: Christ Church, Oxford (B.A., M.A., B.C., D.D.)

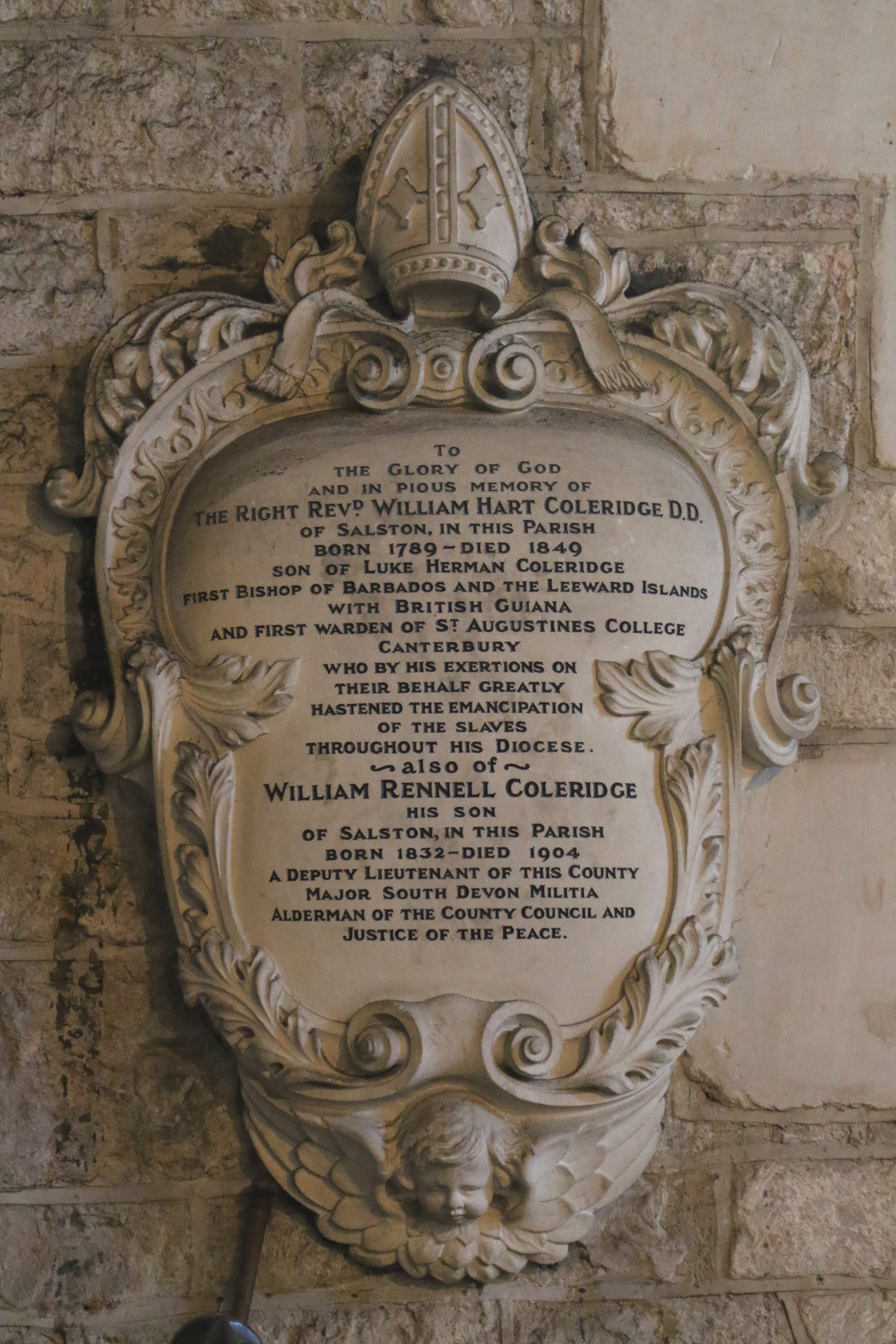
Memorial in St Mary's Church, Ottery St Mary

The Rt Rev William Hart Coleridge (27 June 1789 – 20 December 1849) was the first Bishop of Barbados from 1824 until 1842.

== Life ==
He was born on 27 June 1789. He was the only son of Luke Herman Coleridge of Thorverton, Devonshire, and his wife, Sarah, the third daughter of Richard Hart of Exeter. His father (a brother of Samuel Taylor Coleridge) died during his infancy, and he was educated by his uncle, the Rev. George Coleridge, master of the grammar school of Ottery St. Mary. He entered as a commoner of Christ Church, Oxford, under Cyril Jackson, and was noticed for his 'earnest application and sweetness of manners.' He graduated B.A. 21 November 1811, M.A. 1 June 1814, B.C. 17 June 1824, D.D. 18 June 1824.

Soon after leaving the university he became one of the curates of St. Andrew's, Holborn, and afterwards secretary to the Society for Promoting Christian Knowledge; he was also preacher at the National Society's chapel in Ely Place.

=== Bishop of Barbados ===
In 1824, he was consecrated bishop of Barbados. During his enrollment on 29 January 1829 the streets of Bridgetown, Barbados, from Trafalgar Square to St. Michael’s Cathedral were lined with the four companies of the Royal Militia presided over by Major George Walrond (co-heir to the Barony of Welles). He found the diocese in an unsatisfactory condition. The number of clergymen and churches was insufficient, and there were few daily schools and Sunday schools. In his first charge (delivered in 1830) the bishop noted an improvement, especially in the condition of the black population, who had now almost entirely abandoned such customs as the howlings over the dead and the offering of food at graves. In a charge delivered in July 1838, just before the legal emancipation of the slaves in the West Indian colonies, he states that the black residents 'flock to the churches and chapels,' and are 'civil in their behaviour' and 'decent in their appearance.' At this time the number of communicants was unusually large. There were 99 clergy in the diocese, 42 school-houses, and 53 parish churches. Seven of the churches had now been rebuilt after their destruction in the hurricane which devastated Barbados on 11 August 1831.

In 1842, after about sixteen years' zealous labour, Coleridge was compelled to resign his see through the failure of his health. The large diocese was then divided, the three archdeaconries of Barbados, Antigua, and Guiana being erected into separate sees.

=== Later work ===
On the establishment of St. Augustine's Missionary College at Canterbury, Coleridge was induced to become the first warden, and held the office till his death, which took place very suddenly, 21 December 1849, at his seat of Salston, Ottery St. Mary. Coleridge was a member of the Canterbury Association from 27 March 1848 until his death.

== Family ==
He married, in 1825, the eldest daughter of Dr. Thomas Rennell, dean of Winchester and master of the Temple. She was a granddaughter of Sir William Blackstone, the judge. He had by her a son and a daughter who survived him.

== Works ==
Among Coleridge's published writings are :

- 'An Address delivered to the Candidates for Holy Orders in the Diocese of Barbados,' &c., London, 1829, 12mo.
- 'An Address to Young Persons after Confirmation,' London, 1829, 12mo.
- ' Charges and Addresses delivered to the Clergy of the Diocese of Barbados and the Leeward Islands; together with Prayers on certain public occasions and Addresses to Candidates for Holy Orders, &c. (with an Appendix containing tabular statements, &c., relating to the state of the Diocese of Barbados, &c.),' London, 1835, 8vo.
- 'A Charge delivered to the Clergy ... in British Guiana,' &c., Demerara, 1836, 8vo.
- 'A Charge delivered 25 July 1838,' London, 1838, 8vo. 6. Various sermons, &c., published separately.

Anglican Communion titles
Preceded by Inaugural appointment	Bishop of Barbados; 1824–1842	Succeeded by Thomas Parry
