= Emil Caswell =

Guyanese priest

Emil George Henry Caswell was the Dean of St George's Cathedral, Georgetown, Guyana, from 1894 until 1910.

Born in 1854, he was educated at Magdalen College, Oxford, and began his career with curacies at St Mary, West Rainton, and St Andrew's, Auckland, before incumbencies at Hunwick and Bishopwearmouth. After his spell overseas, he returned to the North East as Vicar of St John's, Darlington, now defunct.

Caswell died of heart failure in Darlington on 16 May 1913, aged 59. He and his wife, Ethel, had six children.

== Notes ==
Church of England titles
| Preceded by Henry John May | Dean of St. George's Cathedral, Georgetown; 1894 – 1910 | Succeeded by Ernest Sloman |
