= Michael Maxwell =

Anglican bishop (born 1971)

Michael Bruce St John Maxwell (born 1971) is an Anglican bishop, who since 2019 has been the Bishop of Barbados.

Maxwell was previously Rector of Holy Trinity Church and a member of the Senate of Barbados.

Anglican Communion titles
Preceded by John Holder	Bishop of Barbados; 2019 - present	Succeeded by Incumbent
