= Frederick Sydney Parry =

British civil servant (1861–1941)

Sir Frederick Sydney Parry, KBE, CB (5 June 1861 – 22 May 1941) was a senior British civil servant, serving as deputy chairman of the Board of Customs from 1904 to 1909, and of the Board of Customs and Excise from 1909 to 1925

Born on 5 June 1861, the second son of E. Parry, Bishop Suffragan of Dover, Frederick Sydney Parry was educated at Winchester and at Balliol College, Oxford. In 1885 he was appointed to the Board of Trade, but the next year transferred to the Treasury and became in 1888 assistant private secretary to the Chancellor of the Exchequer, which post he retained until 1892. From 1897 to 1892 he was private secretary to the First Lord of the Treasury. He was appointed a Companion of the Order of the Bath (CB) in the 1902 Coronation Honours list on 26 June 1902, and in July that year was appointed a private secretary to the new Prime Minister, Alfred Balfour. Only three months later, he transferred to the Treasury, where he had been promoted to Principal Clerk.

He was created a Knight Commander of the Order of the British Empire (KBE) in the 1925 Birthday Honours.

Parry married a daughter of Dean Fremantle, of Ripon, and had a son, Admiral Sir William Edward Parry KCB and a daughter, Katherine (born 1895).

Parry died at Hove on 22 May 1941.
