= John Holder (bishop) =

Barbadian Anglican archbishop (born 1949)

John Walder Dunlop Holder (born 1949 in Bath Village, St. John, Barbados) is a former Barbadian Anglican archbishop. He was the Anglican Archbishop of the West Indies and held the See of Barbados.

He was born at Bath Village, St. John on the island of Barbados and attended the parishes' Elementary Mixed School (1953–1958), graduated from the Modern High School and went to Codrington College, a theological college affiliated with the University of the West Indies at Cave Hill. Leaving school, he married Betty Lucas-Holder, with whom he had son Stuart, and began work as a teacher and a civil servant before entering Codrington College in 1971 to be trained for the priesthood for the Diocese of the Windward Islands. He graduated from the college in 1975, having obtained a Bachelor of Arts (BA) in Theology from the University of the West Indies and a Diploma in Theological Studies of Codrington College.

Ordained deacon in December 1974 it was just a year and nine months later, in September 1976, he was ordained to the priesthood in St. George's Cathedral on the island of St Vincent where he spent two years as a curate. He returned to his home island of Barbados in 1977 as tutor in Biblical Studies at Codrington College. This allowed him to continue part-time at his academic studies at the School of Theology, the University of the South, from which he graduated in 1981 with a Master of Sacred Theology (STM) and a major in Old Testament Studies (hermeneutics and the writings of Second Temple Judaism).

At this period he travelled to England where he was made Honorary Chaplain at the university Church of Christ the King, Gordon Square, London (1981–1984) and to further study at King's College London, gaining a Doctor of Philosophy (PhD) in Old Testament Studies four years later in 1985. Returning to Barbados in 1984, he rejoined the staff of Codrington College now as lecturer in Old Testament Studies. Along with his work at Codrington, he performed duties in parishes in the Diocese of Barbados as an Assistant Priest, first at Cathedral Church of St. Michael and then at St Augustine's Church in 1986, before being appointed Priest-in-Charge of this parish from 1989 to 1990. In the decade between 1990 and 2000 he continued serving as Priest-in-Charge in a number of churches - St John's Parish Church (1990–1992), St Mark and St Catherine (1992–1993), St Mark (1993–1994), Holy Trinity (1994–1995) and finally Holy Cross (1995–2000).

It was during this last tenure that in 1996 he was made an Honorary Canon of the Diocese of Barbados and three years later, in 1999, he received an award for his work at Codrington College. Then in March 2000 he became the thirteenth Bishop of Barbados, succeeding Rufus Brome, who had then retired.

Later in 2005, whilst a member of the Advisory group to Anglican Observer at the United Nations (2003–2006), for his contribution to Theology in Barbados, he earned the Errol Barrow Award.

On 10 December 2009, election of the next archbishop took place at Guyana's then new Convention Hall in Georgetown during a meeting of the Provincial Synod of the Church and Holder became the new archbishop of the Province of the West Indies (a member province in the worldwide Anglican Communion).

Holder retired in 2018.

Anglican Communion titles
Preceded by Rufus Brome	Bishop of Barbados; 2000 - 2018	Succeeded by Michael Maxwell
