= Cornell Moss =

Cornell Jerome Moss (31 December 1959 – 30 May 2015) was the Bishop of Guyana from 8 December 2009 until his death.

He was born on 31 December 1959, and educated at Codrington College, Barbados and Nashotah House, Wisconsin. He was ordained a deacon on 5 January 1983, and priest on 5 January 1984 by Michael Hartley Eldon, 11th Bishop of Nassau and The Bahamas and the Turks and Caicos Islands. He was appointed Curate at Christ the King Parish, Ridgeland Park, Nassau, Bahamas, Rector of St John the Baptist Parish on Marsh Harbour, Abaco in September 1986. After six and a half years, he was appointed second Rector of the Church of the Ascension, Freeport in March 1992. In 2000, he became Archdeacon of the Northern Bahamas and was elected diocesan bishop of the Diocese of Guyana in August 2009. Moss died on 30 May 2015 while recovering from heart surgery in Miami, Florida.
