= Derek Goodrich =

Guyanese priest (1927–2021)

Derek Hugh Goodrich (15 July 1927 – 6 September 2021) was an Anglican priest who was the Dean of St George's Cathedral, Georgetown, Guyana, from 1984 to 1993.

Born in July 1927, Goodrich was educated at Selwyn College, Cambridge (BA 1948, MA 1954). He was ordained deacon in 1953 and priest in 1953 after studying at St Stephen's House, Oxford.

He began his ordained ministry as a curate at St Andrew and St Francis Willesden Green (1952-57) before then moving to what was then British Guiana. He was successively curate of St Philip's, Georgetown (1957), Vicar of Lodge (1957-67) and Vicar of Port Mourant (1967-71). He was then rector of New Amsterdam (1971-84). From here he became Rural Dean of Berbice, then Archdeacon of Demerara before being elected to the deanery of the diocese in 1984. A noted historian, he resigned in 1993 and retired to Lingfield, Surrey.

Goodrich died in September 2021, at the age of 94.
