= Henry Wroth (cricketer) =

English cricketer, lawyer, and consular official

Personal information
- Full name: Henry Thomas Wroth
- Born: 6 April 1823; Northchurch, Hertfordshire, England
- Died: 26 October 1861 (aged 38); Bebek, Constantinople, Ottoman Empire
- Batting: Unknown
- Bowling: Unknown
- Relatives: Warwick Wroth (brother)

Domestic team information
- Years: Team
- 1844–1846: Cambridge University

Career statistics
Competition	First-class
Matches	6
Runs scored	130
Batting average	16.25
100s/50s	–/–
Top score	34
Balls bowled	90
Wickets	22
Bowling average	?
5 wickets in innings	–
10 wickets in match	–
Best bowling	4/?
Catches/stumpings	2/–
- Source: Cricinfo, 5 July 2022

Henry Thomas Wroth (6 April 1823 – 26 October 1861) was an English lawyer, a consular official and a cricketer who played in six first-class cricket matches for Cambridge University, between 1844 and 1846. He was born at Northchurch, Hertfordshire and died at Bebek, Constantinople, Turkey.

Wroth was educated at Uppingham School and St John's College, Cambridge. As a cricketer, he was a middle-order batsman and a bowler, though it is not known whether he was right- or left-handed, nor what his style of bowling was; in addition, full bowling analyses have not survived for most of his first-class matches. His best batting was in his only Cambridge University match of 1844 that has been accorded first-class status – the game against the Marylebone Cricket Club (MCC) in which he scored 26 and 34, though MCC won the match by an innings. In 1845 and in his single game in 1846, he was more successful as a bowler, and in the 1845 University Match against Oxford University he took six wickets, his side winning a low-scoring match.

Wroth graduated from Cambridge University with a Bachelor of Arts degree in 1846, and this converted to a Master of Arts in 1849; he was also awarded the Hulsean prize for his dissertation and made a fellow of St John's College. He became a lawyer and was called to the bar in 1851 as a member of the Inner Temple; he served as master in the supreme consular court at Constantinople and as vice-consul to the Ottoman Empire. He died there after a short illness in 1861.

Wroth's brother, Warwick Wroth, played first-class cricket in two matches in 1848, one each for Cambridge University and MCC.
