= James Clements =

James Clements may refer to:

- James Clements (ornithologist) (1927–2005), American ornithologist, author and businessman
- James Clements (bishop) (1911–1977), American prelate of the Episcopal Church
- James P. Clements (born 1964), president of Clemson University
- Jimmy Clements (1847–1927), Australian Aboriginal leader
- James Clements, British electronic music producer known as ASC

== See also ==
- James Clements Municipal Airport, Michigan, United States
- James Clement (disambiguation)
