= John Franklin Parry =

Royal Navy Admiral (1863–1926)

Admiral Sir John Franklin Parry, KCB, FRGS (15 August 1863 – 21 April 1926) was a Royal Navy officer. He was Hydrographer of the Navy from 1914 to 1919.

== Career ==
Parry was the son of the Rt Rev Edward Parry, Bishop of Dover, and the grandson of the Arctic explorer Sir William Edward Parry, who was Hydrographer of the Navy from 1823 to 1829.

His nephew Admiral Sir William Edward Parry also achieved distinction in the Royal Navy.

Parry joined the Royal Navy, and was promoted to lieutenant on 20 January 1885, then to commander on 30 June 1899. In February 1903 he was appointed in command of the survey ship HMS Egeria.
