= David Bentley (bishop of Barbados) =

Barbadian Anglican bishop

Bentley in c1920.

David Williams Bentley CBE (1882–1970) was the 7th Bishop of Barbados.

Born in Liverpool, he was ordained in 1906 and served as a curate in Barrow-in-Furness from 1906 to 1910. Educated at Durham University, he served as President of St Cuthbert's Society in 1910, establishing a reputation as a scholar, a dedicated oarsman and a committed and proselytising socialist having acquired his socialism when serving as curate in the slums of Barrow. A curacy in Bethnal Green (1910–1914) was followed by two years as Vicar of St Matthias Plaistow.

In 1917 he emigrated to the Caribbean to take up the post of Warden of St Peter's College, Jamaica. He was consecrated bishop in 1919, after which he served as Suffragan Bishop of Jamaica until he was appointed Bishop of Barbados in 1927. A particular feature of his episcopacy was the promotion of education, and in 1938 he was appointed a CBE for his services to education in Barbados.

Bentley retired in 1945 but continued to live in Barbados until his death in 1970.

Anglican Communion titles
| Preceded by Alfred Berkeley | Bishop of Barbados; 1927–1945 | Succeeded by James Hughes |
