= James Hughes (bishop) =

Anglican bishop (1894–1979)

William James Hughes (1894 – 5 December 1979) was an Anglican bishop in the 20th century.

== Life and career ==
Born in 1894, Hughes was educated at the University of Leeds and obtained a Bachelor of Arts degree. He was ordained Deacon in 1921 and Priest in 1922 after a course of study at the College of the Resurrection, Mirfield. After a period as curate at St Matthew's, Leicester he was appointed Priest in charge at St Hilda's, Leicester. From there, he moved to become Vicar of St Benedict, Bordesley after which he was appointed Rector then Dean of St George's Cathedral, Georgetown, Guyana.

In 1944, Hughes was appointed Bishop of British Honduras. After a very short time in this post, he was translated to Barbados, during which time he set up the Barbados Church Association to prepare for disestablishment. In 1951, he returned to England to be Vicar of St George's Church, Edgbaston, and additionally served as an Assistant Bishop of Birmingham. He was also made an honorary Canon of Birmingham Cathedral in 1952. Two years later, however, he was enthroned as the first Bishop of Matabeleland. During his time in Matabeleland, he became known for his dry comments on the administration of the region – for example, when it was proposed to have a second capital at Bulawayo, he offered this quote from W. S. Gilbert: "Ambassadors cropped up like hay, Prime Ministers and such they grew as asparagus in May and Dukes were three a penny." After four years, he became the Archbishop of Central Africa.

In 1957, he was awarded a Lambeth degree by Geoffrey Fisher, the Archbishop of Canterbury. He was a Sub-Prelate of the Order of St John of Jerusalem from 1958 and in 1961 he was translated for the final time to Trinidad. He retired in 1970 to Canada, where he continued to minister at Holy Trinity, Port Burwell, Ontario. He died whilst visiting friends in Harare on 5 December 1979.

Anglican Communion titles
Preceded by Charles Norman Smith	Rector & Sub-Dean of St. George's Cathedral, Georgetown; 1930–1937	Not replaced
Preceded by Oswald Parry	Dean of St George's Cathedral, Georgetown; 1937–1943	Succeeded by Frank Thatcher
Preceded by Edward Dunn	Bishop of British Honduras; 1943–1945	Succeeded by Douglas Wilson
Preceded by David Bentley	Bishop of Barbados; 1945–1951	Succeeded by Gay Mandeville
New title	Bishop of Matabeleland; 1953–1961	Succeeded by Kenneth Skelton
Preceded by Edward Paget	Archbishop of Central Africa; 1956–1961	Succeeded by Oliver Green-Wilkinson
Preceded by Noel Chamberlain	Bishop of Trinidad and Tobago; 1961–1969	Succeeded by Clive Abdulah
