= Elizabeth Monroe (historian) =

English historian

Elizabeth Monroe CMG (16 January 1905 – 10 March 1986) was an English historian of South-west Asia.

Monroe was appointed Companion of the Most Distinguished Order of St. Michael and St. George in the 1973 New Year Honours for "services to Middle East studies".

== Works ==
- (with A. H. M. Jones) A History of Abyssinia (1935)
- The Mediterranean in Politics (1938)
- "British Interests in the Middle East" (1948)
- Britain's Moment in the Middle East, 1914-1956 (1963)
- Philby of Arabia (1973)
