= Herbert Bree =

Bishop of Barbados and the Windward Islands; British Anglican colonial bishop

Herbert Bree (4 January 1828 – 26 February 1899) was a colonial Anglican bishop from 1882 until 1899.

Born in 1828, Bree was educated in Bury St Edmunds and at Gonville and Caius College, Cambridge. He was ordained in 1852.

After curacies in Suffolk he held incumbencies at Harkstead and Brampton before his ordination to the episcopate as Bishop of Barbados and the Windward Islands in 1882. He died in post on 26 February 1899.

Anglican Communion titles
Preceded by John Mitchinson	Bishop of Barbados and the Windward Islands; 1882–1899	Succeeded by Proctor Swaby
