= Philip Elder =

Philip Edward Randolph Elder was an Anglican bishop in the 20th century.
He was born in 1921, educated at Codrington College, Barbados and ordained in 1951. His first post was as a Curate at St George's Cathedral Guyana. Later he held incumbencies in Suddie and Plaisance. After this he was Suffragan Bishop of Stabroek and then Bishop of the Windward Islands.
He died on 16 March 2010.

== Notes ==
Anglican Communion titles
Preceded by George Cuthbert Manning Woodroffe	Bishop of the Windward Islands; 1986–1993	Succeeded by Sehon Sylvester Goodridge
