= Francis Austin (priest) =

Francis Webster Austin (4 February 1829, Clapham, Surrey – 1905, Abingdon) was an Anglo-Guyanese clergyman, Dean of St George's Cathedral, Georgetown, British Guiana from 1884 until 1890.

== Early life ==
Austin was the son of the Rev. Wiltshire Stanton Austin and Dunkin Webster. He was educated at King's College London and Jesus College, Cambridge, gaining his BA in 1855.

== Professional career ==
Ordained deacon in 1856, he was briefly Curate of St Nicholas, Cardiff before emigrating to British Guiana. Initially Diocesan Registrar he was then successively: Rural Dean of Berbice; Archdeacon of Berbice from 1883 to 1884; and concurrently Archdeacon of Demerara and Dean of Georgetown from 1884 to 1890. Before Austin's appointment, William Piercy Austin, Bishop since 1840, had also served as Dean.

Returning to England, Austin became Rector of West Ilsley, Berkshire in 1892.

== Personal life ==
He married his cousin, Jo Austin, in 1858.

== Death ==
Living in Abingdon in 1904, he died there in 1905.
