= William Austin (bishop) =

Anglican Bishop of British Guiana (1807–1892)

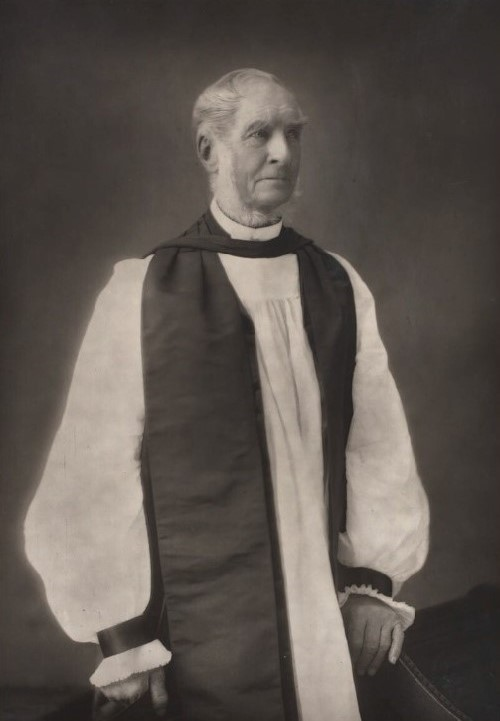
Bishop Austin

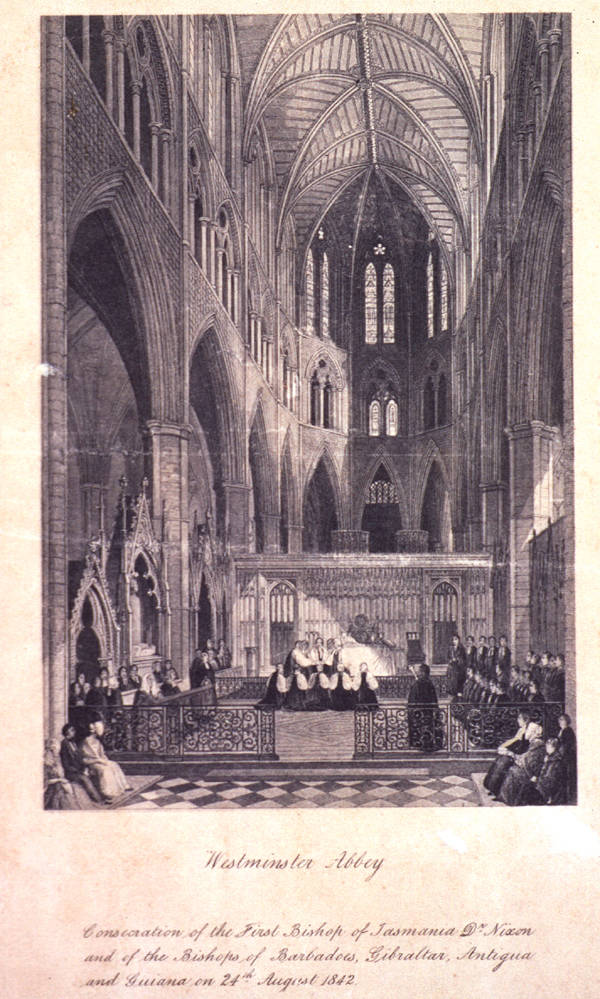
Austin's consecration

Lord William Piercy Austin (7 November 1807 – 9 November 1892) was the inaugural and long serving Bishop of Guyana from 1842 until his death.

== Life ==
He was the son of William Austin (1759–1817), co-owner of the Land of Plenty plantation in British Guiana, and his wife Mehetabel Piercy; he was born in Stone, Staffordshire. He matriculated at Exeter College, Oxford in 1825, graduating B.A. 1829, and M.A. 1835.

Ordained in 1831, Austin was in rapid succession curate, vicar and Rural Dean of Georgetown, then Archdeacon and Bishop. He was consecrated a bishop at Westminster Abbey on 24 August 1842, to serve as first Bishop of British Guiana. In the words of the youthful Queen Victoria, he was "the youngest and handsomest of my Bishops."

In 1884, Austin was appointed Primate of the West Indies and in 1891, Prelate of the Order of St Michael and St George.

In 1884, Austin founded the Anglican Grammar School for Boys, which was intended to educate the elite. The school was later renamed Queen's College, and has provided education for four presidents and three prime ministers, among others.

== Legacy ==
The Austin House, the official residence of the Anglican bishops of Guyana has been named after William Austin, as is Austin Street, Subryanville, Georgetown.

== Notes ==
Church of England titles
| New title | Deans of St George's Cathedral, Georgetown; 1842–1884 | Succeeded by Francis Austin |
| New title | Bishop of Guyana; 1842–1892 | Succeeded by Proctor Swaby |
| New title | Primate of the West Indies; 1884–1892 | Succeeded by Enos Nuttall |
