= Sehon Goodridge =

Sehon Sylvester Goodridge was an Anglican bishop and author from Barbados.

He was born on 9 October 1937, educated at Harrison College, Codrington College, Barbados and King's College, London and ordained in 1964. His first post was as a curate in Castries, Saint Lucia after which he was chaplain of the University of the West Indies. Later he was principal of Codrington College and then warden at the Cave Hill Campus, Barbados. His last appointment before elevation to the episcopate as Bishop of the Windward Islands was as Principal of the Simon of Cyrene Theological Institute. An Honorary Chaplain to the Queen, he died on 28 December 2007. In 2008 members of the Trinidad and Tobago chapter of the Codrington Diploma in Theological Studies Program obtained permission from his widow, Janet, to set up The Sehon Goodridge Theological Society as an Interdenominational Organisation to promote theological research and study and Interfaith dialogue.

== Notes ==
Anglican Communion titles
Preceded by Philip Edward Randolph Elder	Bishop of the Windward Islands; 1994–2002	Succeeded by Calvert Leopold Friday
