= Harold Crichlow =

Dean of Barbados

Harold Edmund Crichlow was the longest serving dean of Dean of Barbados from 1972 until 2000.

He was educated at Combermere School, Codrington College and St Chad's College, Durham University. After a curacy at Christ Church, Barbados he was Head Master at Christ Church High School before he returned to his alma mater Combermere School. In 1969, he was appointed Chaplain at the University of the West Indies Mona Campus by the Archbishop of the West Indies, Rt. Revd. Alan Knight and in 1972 was appointed the first dean of colour of Barbados by Rt. Revd. Drexel Gomez, a contemporary at St Chad's College, Durham when Bishop Gomez was appointed by the House of Bishops of the Church of the Province of the West Indies.

Dean Crichlow was a strong proponent of social justice and used his monthly sermons which were broadcast country wide to speak to injustices and their remedy. He hosted programmes in the electronic media on "For Love of Country" and "For Love of Family".

In 1999, in recognition of his services to religion, he was awarded the Gold Crown of Merit (GCM) by the Government of Barbados. After his retirement in 2000, at the mandatory age of 65, he was appointed an independent senator in the Upper House of Parliament. He was the Deputy President of the Senate of Barbados. He was a Fellow of St Chad's College, Durham.

He was married to Bernice Crichlow born Lowe with whom he is the parent of two girls Grace Anne and Gloria and granddaughter Claire.

He was then married to Margot Rawlings born Thorington.

In recognition of his service to the Diocese of Barbados, he was styled as Dean Emeritus in retirement. He died on 22 June 2025.
