= Charles Davidson (bishop) =

Bishop of Guyana

Charles Davidson has been the Bishop of Guyana since 2016.

Davidson was born in Mackenzie, Linden, and educated at Mackenzie High School, Government Technical Institute in Electrical Craft Practice, Codrington College, Barbados, and University of the West Indies, Cave Hill. He was ordained a deacon in 1977 and a priest in 1978. He did post-grad work at Princeton Theological Seminary, General Theological Seminary and University of the South, Sewanee. He is a trained mentor and consultant in Congregational Development specializing in church wellness. His previous post was as a parish priest in Philadelphia.
