= Harry Livermore =

Sir Harry Livermore Kt.

Lord Mayor of Liverpool
- In office 1958–1959
- Preceded by: Frank Hamilton Cain L.L.D.
- Succeeded by: Herbert Neville Bewley C.B.E.

Personal details
- Born: 17 October 1908
- Died: 5 December 1989 (aged 81)

Sir Harry Livermore (1908–1989) was a Liverpool solicitor and local politician who served as Lord Mayor of Liverpool.

== Biography ==
Livermore was educated at the Royal Grammar School, Newcastle upon Tyne and at the University of Durham. He qualified as a solicitor in 1930 and entered practice in Liverpool. In 1985 he represented many of the defendants in the stadium disaster in Heysel, Belgium. He was a partner in the law firm Silverman Livermore.

He entered Liverpool City Council in 1945 as a labour candidate for Abercromby but lost his seat in 1947. He tried unsuccessfully for Castle Street Ward in 1950 election but gained a seat in his old ward of Abercromby in 1953. He was elected as an Alderman in 1955. He served as Lord Mayor of Liverpool from 1958–59.

He served as Chairman of the Royal Liverpool Philharmonic Society, the Merseyside Arts Association and the Everyman Theatre. He was knighted in 1973 for his services to the arts.

== See also ==
- 1945 Liverpool City Council election
- 1947 Liverpool City Council election
- 1950 Liverpool City Council election
- Mayors and Lord Mayors of Liverpool 1207 to present
- 1973 New Year Honours
