= Lewis Evans (bishop) =

Bishop of Barbados from 1960 to 1971

The Rt. Rev. Edward Lewis Evans (1904–1996) was Bishop of Barbados from 1960 until 1971.

He was born in 1904 and educated at Tonbridge School. He was ordained in 1938 and began his ecclesiastical career with a curacy at St Mary's, Prittlewell followed by the post of Warden of St Peter's Theological College, Jamaica. He was successively Rector of Kingston Parish Church, Archdeacon of Surrey and then Bishop Suffragan of Kingston before his translation to Barbados. A noted author, he died on 30 December 1996.

== Notes and references ==
Anglican Communion titles
Preceded by Gay Lisle Griffith Mandeville	Bishop of Barbados; 1960–1971	Succeeded by Drexel Wellington Gomez
