= Leopold Friday =

Anglican bishop

The Rt Rev Calvert Leopold Friday CMG is the current Bishop of the Windward Islands.

He was born into an ecclesiastical family – his father is the Revd Fr Calvert Friday, now assistant minister at St Matthew's, Biabou, Saint Vincent.

== Notes ==
Anglican Communion titles
Preceded by Sehon Sylvester Goodridge	Bishop of the Windward Islands; 2003 –	Succeeded by Current incumbent
