= Church of All Saints, Doddinghurst =

Church in Essex, England

Coordinates: 51.6673°N 0.2966°E

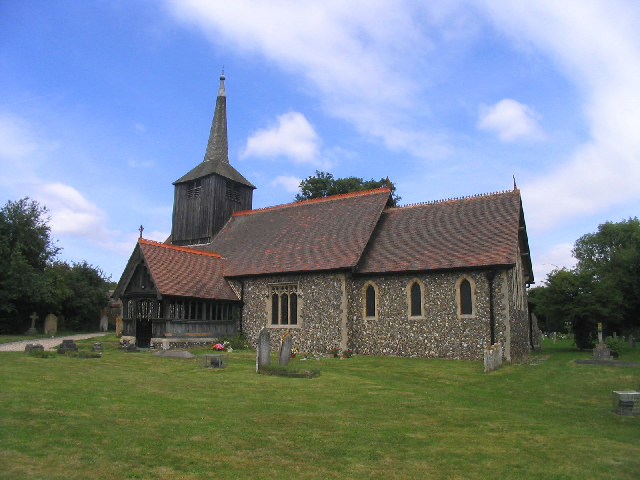
All Saints' Church seen from the southeast

The Church of All Saints is a Church of England parish church in Doddinghurst, Essex. The church is a Grade I listed building.

== Notable clergy ==
- Oswald Trellis, priest-in-charge from 2002 to 2005
- Ann Coleman, priest-in-charge from 2015 to present
