= Thomas Parry (bishop) =

Welsh clergyman (1794–1870)

Thomas Parry (1794 – 16 March 1870) was a Welsh clergyman in the West Indies who rose to become Bishop of Barbados from 1842 to 1869.

== Background and education ==
He was born on 27 November 1794 the fourth son of Edward Parry, a clergyman in North Wales, who at that time was rector of Llanferres, Denbighshire. Parry was educated at Oriel College, Oxford, matriculating in 1812 and graduating first-class in mathematics and second-class in classics four years later. He was appointed a Fellow of Balliol College, Oxford in 1818 and obtained a Master of Arts in the following year. He was made deacon in 1819 and ordained priest in 1820, both times by the Bishop of Oxford.

== Career ==
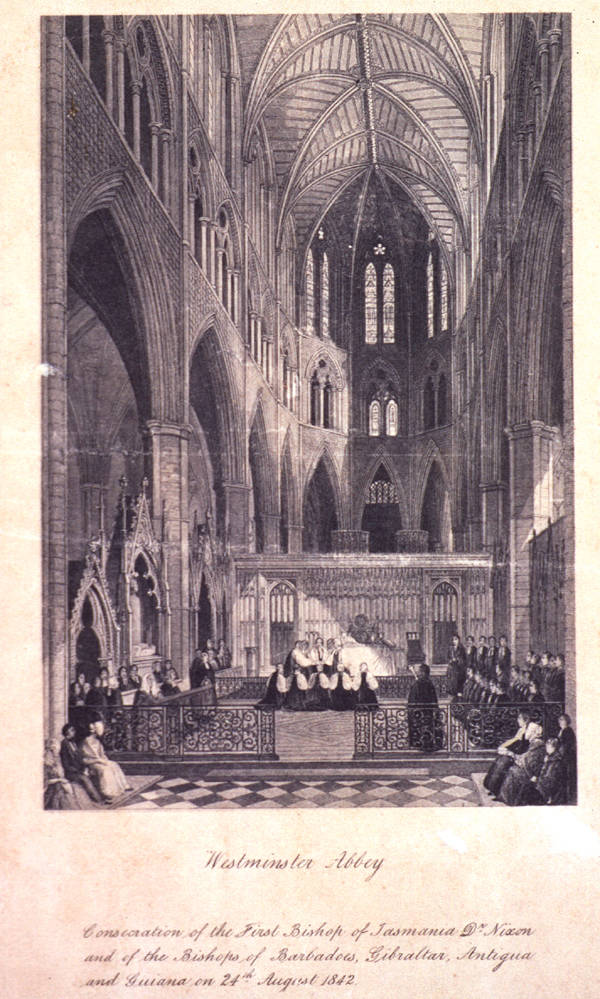
Parry's consecration

Parry became Archdeacon of Antigua in 1825 and was transferred to Barbados in 1840. Two years later, he was nominated to be the second Bishop of Barbados. On 24 August 1842, Parry was consecrated a bishop at Westminster Abbey. He held the See until 1869 when he returned to England following a breakdown in his health.

== Family and death ==
In 1824, he married Louisa, third daughter of Henry Hutton, rector of Beaumont-cum-Moze He is the great grandfather of actor Robert Hardy . Parry died on 16 March 1870 in Malvern, Worcestershire.

Anglican Communion titles
Preceded by William Coleridge	Bishop of Barbados; 1842–1869	Succeeded by John Mitchinson
