= Warwick Reed Wroth =

English cricketer and clergyman

Personal information
- Full name: Warwick Reed Wroth
- Born: c. 1825; Northchurch, Hertfordshire, England
- Died: 11 April 1867 (aged 41/42); Kensington, Middlesex, England
- Batting: Right-handed
- Relatives: Henry Wroth (brother)

Domestic team information
- Years: Team
- 1848: Cambridge University

Career statistics
Competition	First-class
Matches	2
Runs scored	18
Batting average	4.50
100s/50s	–/–
Top score	9
Catches/stumpings	–/–
- Source: Cricinfo, 5 July 2022

Warwick Reed Wroth (c. 1825 – 11 April 1867) was an English clergyman and a cricketer who played in two first-class cricket matches, one each for Cambridge University Cricket Club and the Marylebone Cricket Club (MCC), both of them in 1848. He was born at Northchurch in Hertfordshire, though the precise date of his birth is not known, and he died at Kensington in London.

Wroth was educated at Uppingham School and Emmanuel College, Cambridge. As a cricketer, he appeared in the two matches between Cambridge University and the MCC in 1848, playing once for each side, but had little success in either match; it is not known whether he batted right- or left-handed and there is no record that he bowled in either game.

Wroth graduated from Cambridge University with a Bachelor of Arts degree in 1848, and this converted to a Master of Arts in 1864. He was ordained as a deacon in the Church of England in 1849 and as a priest the following year. He was curate at Brompton Regis in Somerset and at Pightlesthorne in Buckinghamshire before he arrived at St Philip's Church, Clerkenwell, in 1851 as curate, becoming priest-in-charge in 1854 and remaining there until his death. He was buried at Highgate Cemetery.

Wroth's brother Henry played first-class cricket for Cambridge University between 1844 and 1846; his son, Warwick William Wroth, one of four sons and four daughters by his second marriage, became an expert on coins and a contributor to the Dictionary of National Biography.
