= Ronald Shapley =

British Anglican bishop

Ronald Norman Shapley MC was a Colonial Anglican Bishop in the Windward Islands from 1949 until 1962.

He was born on 16 July 1890 and educated at King's College London. After World War I with the London Regiment he was ordained in 1920. After a curacy at St Clement's Notting Hill he was Chaplain of the Gordon Boys' Home. In 1927 he entered the Chaplains' Branch of the RAF rising in time to be Assistant Chaplain-in-Chief before his appointment to the episcopate. He was ordained and consecrated a bishop on St Luke's day (18 October) at Southwark Cathedral by Geoffrey Fisher, Archbishop of Canterbury, and died on 27 December 1964.
