= Harold Piggott =

Antiguan Anglican bishop

Harold Grant Pigott CBE (20 August 1894 – 26 August 1979) was an Antiguan-born Anglican bishop who served as Bishop of the Windward Islands from 1962 until 1969.

He was educated at the Codrington College, Barbados and ordained in 1918. After a curacy at St Lucy, Barbados, he was Rector of Barrouallie and Calliaqua on St Vincent. After this he was Archdeacon of St Vincent and then Grenada before his appointment to the episcopate.
