= Margaret Davies (conservationist) =

English conservationist and archaeologist

Margaret Davies CBE
- Born: Margaret Dunlop; 30 September 1914
- Died: 6 October 1982 (aged 68)
- Known for: Conservationist and archaeologist

Margaret Davies CBE (née Dunlop; 30 September 1914 – 6 October 1982) was an English conservationist and archaeologist. She was the first chair of the Welsh Committee of the Countryside Commission, was also president of the Cardiff Naturalists Club and on the Council of the National Museum of Wales.

== Early life and education ==
Davies was born in Bury, Lancashire in 1914. She attended Bury Grammar School and subsequently Manchester University, where she read Archeology. She wrote her MA thesis on "The distribution of Bronze Age objects and implements in France, with special reference to British and more distant connections". She worked on Bronze Age sites in France and investigated megalithic monuments in the Irish Sea and North Channel coastlands for her Ph.D. dissertation, "The megalithic monuments of the coastlands of the Irish Sea and North Channel" that was published in the Antiquaries Journal.

== Career ==
She became involved in natural history and was a competent field botanist. She was concerned with nature conservancy, and served on the National Parks Commission, the Countryside Commission (including as chair of the Welsh Committee), Pembrokeshire Coast National Park Planning Committee and the Milford Haven Conservancy Board. Other fields of interest were the shieling, the farming communities in Wales, Celtic field systems, the drovers, the English and Welsh languages, plants and animals

She was on the editorial board of Collins's New Naturalist series and revised H.J. Fleur's Natural History of Man in Britain. She edited the Guide to the Brecon Beacons National Park. She was made a Commander of the Order of the British Empire (CBE) in 1973.

== Personal life ==
She married Elwyn Davies, later chief inspector for the Welsh Education Office, in 1940. After World War II ended, she and her husband moved to Cardiff.

She died at Wittybush hospital on 6 October 1982.

== Legacy ==
The Times recorded in her obituary that, as an English woman, she had been accepted by the Welsh "in a way few non-natives are".

At her funeral it was stated that she "gave much in a quiet and unobtrusive way."
