= Vibert Jackson =

British Anglican bishop (1874–1963)

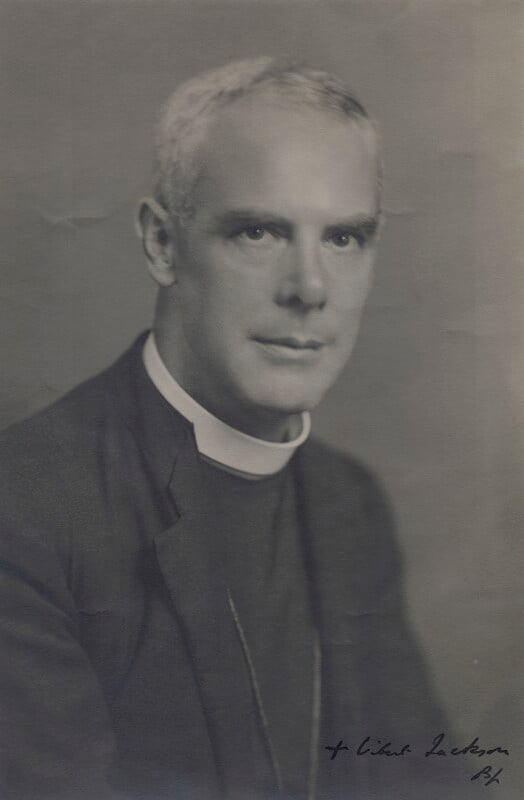
Jackson, c. 1920s–1930s

The Right Reverend Vibert Jackson (1874 – 19 January 1963) was a British Anglican priest who served as Bishop of the Windward Islands from 1930 until 1936.

He was born in 1874 and educated at the City of London School and Keble College, Oxford and ordained in 1899. His first post was as a curate at St Matthews, Newcastle upon Tyne after which he was a missionary priest in Calcutta and then curate in charge of the Mission of the Holy Spirit, Newcastle upon Tyne. From 1906 to 1913 he was Vicar of St Michael and St George, Fulwell then Archdeacon in Central America and later of Grenada before his elevation to the episcopate.

Following his retirement from the Windward Islands, he was Vicar of All Souls, South Ascot (from 1940), and was an Assistant Bishop of Oxford (from late 1951). He held both posts at his death on 19 January 1963. There is a memorial to him at St George's Cathedral, St Vincent. He is buried at All Souls, South Ascot, on the southern edge of the churchyard.
