= Randolph George =

Anglican Bishop of Guyana

Randolph Oswald George (1924 – 18 July 2016) was the Bishop of Guyana from 1980 until 2009.

Born in 1924 and educated at Codrington College, Barbados, after a curacy at St Peter Barbados he spent a decade in England. Successively he was Curate at Leigh, Ardwick, and Lavender Hill before returning to become Chaplain to the Bishop of Trinidad. From there he became Rector of Couva then All Saints, Port of Spain before being elected to the Deanery of the Anglican Diocese of Guyana in 1971. Promoted to be the Suffragan Bishop of Stabroek in 1976, four years later he became Bishop -a position he held until 2009.

Bishop George died on 18 July 2016 at the age of 92.
