= Diocese of the Windward Islands =

Anglican Diocese in the West Indes

The Anglican Diocese of the Windward Islands is one of eight dioceses within the Province of the West Indies. The current bishop is Leopold Friday.

== History ==
The diocese was established on 8 November 1877 from the islands of Saint Vincent and the Grenadines, Grenada and Tobago. Tobago transferred to the Diocese of Trinidad in 1889 when those two islands were joined together politically and Saint Lucia joined the Windward Islands diocese in 1899.

The cathedral church of the see is St. George's Cathedral in Kingstown, Saint Vincent.

== Bishops ==
The new diocese shared a bishop with Barbados until 1927, when the retiring Bishop of Barbados, Alfred Berkeley, was elected as the first full-time Bishop of the Windward Isles.

- 1927–1930 Alfred Berkeley
- 1930–1936 Vibert Jackson
- 1936–1949 Horace Tonks
- 1949–1962 Ronald Shapley
- 1962–1969 Harold Piggott
- 1969–1986 Cuthbert Woodroffe
- 1986–1993 Philip Elder
- 1994–2002 Sehon Goodridge
- 2003–present Leopold Friday
