= Cathedral Church of Saint Michael and All Angels =

Cathedral Church in Barbados

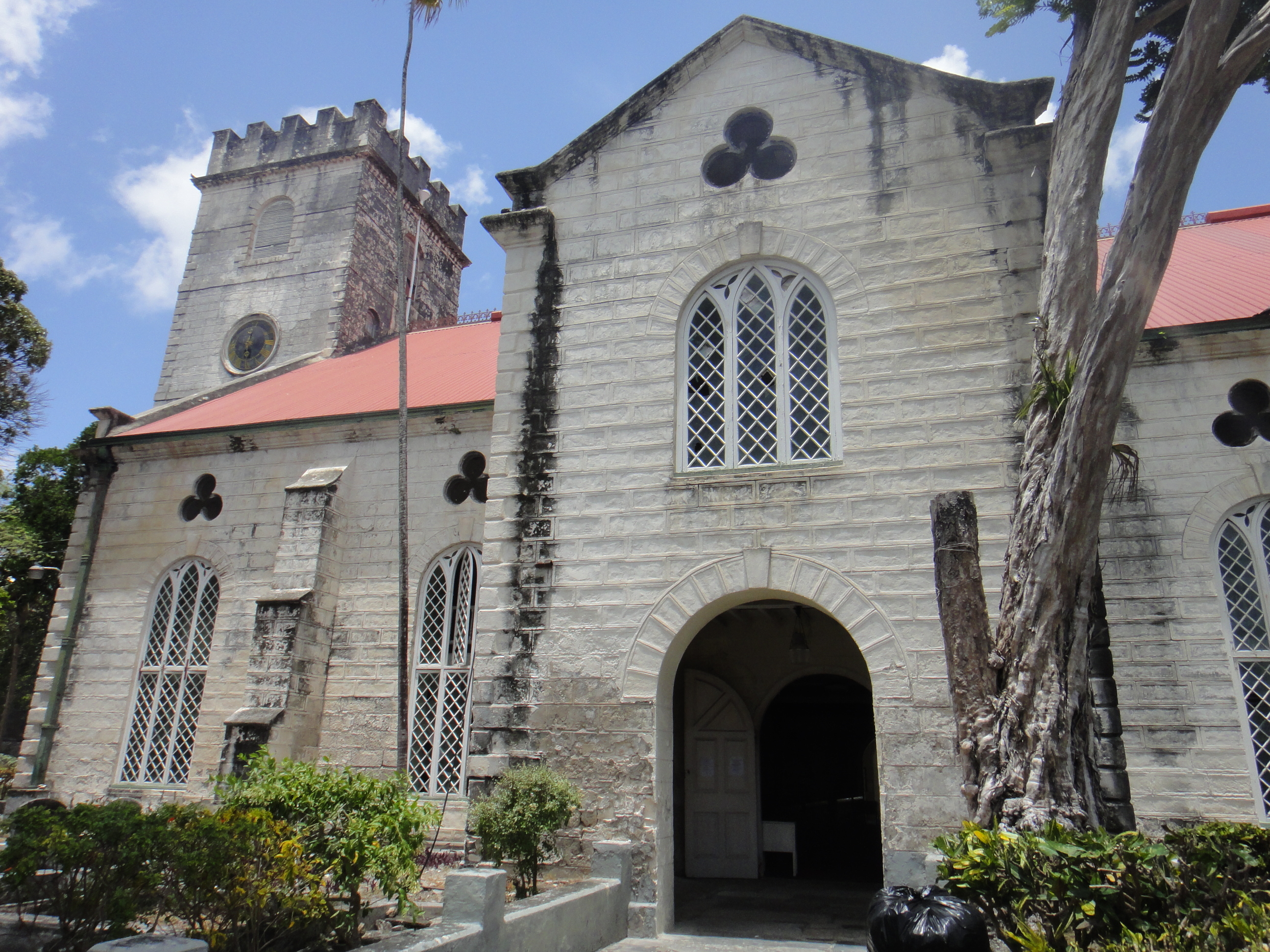

Religion
- Affiliation: Anglican
- Province: Province of the West Indies

Location
- Municipality: Bridgetown
- Interactive map of Cathedral Church of Saint Michael and All Angels
- Coordinates: 13.0978°N 59.6124°W

The Cathedral Church of Saint Michael and All Angels (formerly St. Michael's Parish Church), is an Anglican church located on St. Michael's Row, two blocks east of National Heroes Square; at the centre of Bridgetown, Barbados. It is the tallest Anglican house of worship in Barbados.

== History ==
Originally consecrated in 1665, and then rebuilt in 1789, it was elevated to Cathedral status in 1825 with the appointment of Bishop Coleridge to head the newly created Diocese of Barbados and the Leeward Islands.

The first parish church to be built was St. Michael's Parish Church, which was located where St. Mary's Anglican Church now stands. The original St. Michael's Parish Church was a small wooden building with seating capacity for less than 100 people. It was constructed between 1628 and 1630.

Destroyed by a hurricane in 1780, the church was rebuilt nine years later. It was reconsecrated on September 29, 1789. The church was later damaged in the great hurricane of 1831 but not destroyed. When the Diocese of Barbados was established, St. Michael's Parish Church became St. Michael's Cathedral, with Bishop William Hart Coleridge as its first bishop in 1825.

St. Michael Cathedral is made of coral stone with a beautiful tower and stunning stained glass windows. Inside the church is a marble baptismal font dating to the 17th century. The Chapel of the Blessed Sacrament was added in 1938 and features a roof covered in wallaba heartwood shingles and a Canterbury Cross on the northern wall.

St. Michael's Cathedral continues to be used as a place of regular worship. In the 21st century, it is working to raise funds to restore the building.

== Graveyard ==
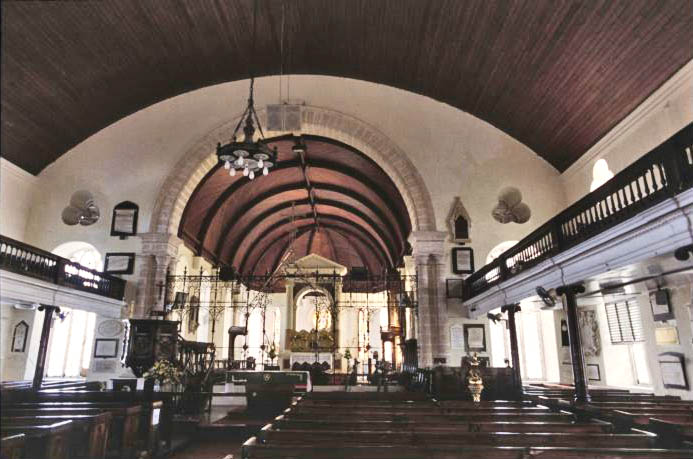
Interior

Buried in the church's graveyard are Grantley Adams (the first chief minister of Barbados and the only Prime Minister of the West Indies Federation), his son, Tom Adams, the island's second Prime Minister), and William Brandford Griffith, former Governor of the Gold Coast colony in Africa (now known today as Ghana)
