= Diocese of Guyana =

Anglican diocese in America

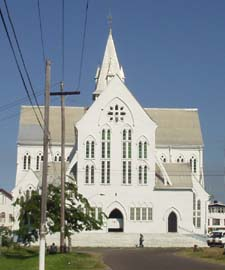
St George's Cathedral, Georgetown

Arms of the Diocese

The Anglican Diocese of Guyana is one of eight within the Province of the West Indies. Its cathedral is St. George's Cathedral, Georgetown. The diocese came into being on 24 August 1842, when William Austin (1842–1892) was consecrated as the first bishop. Bishops who have served the diocese since then have included: Proctor Swaby (1893–1899), Edward Parry (1900–1921), Oswald Parry (1921–1937), Alan Knight (1937–1979), Randolph George (1980–2009) Cornell Moss (2009–2015), and Charles Davidson (2016–2021). The current bishop is Alfred David (2021-Present).

In 1842 (shortly after division), her jurisdiction was described as "Demerara, Essequibo, Berbice". In 1866, there were two archdeaconries: Hugh Hyndman Jones was Archdeacon of Demerara and that of Berbice was vacant.

The diocese also covers Suriname and Cayenne/French Guiana.

In a 2002 census, about 7% of Guyanese described themselves as Anglican.

== See also ==
- Religion in Guyana
- Category:Anglican bishops of Guyana
