= St. George's Cathedral, Georgetown =

St. George's Cathedral
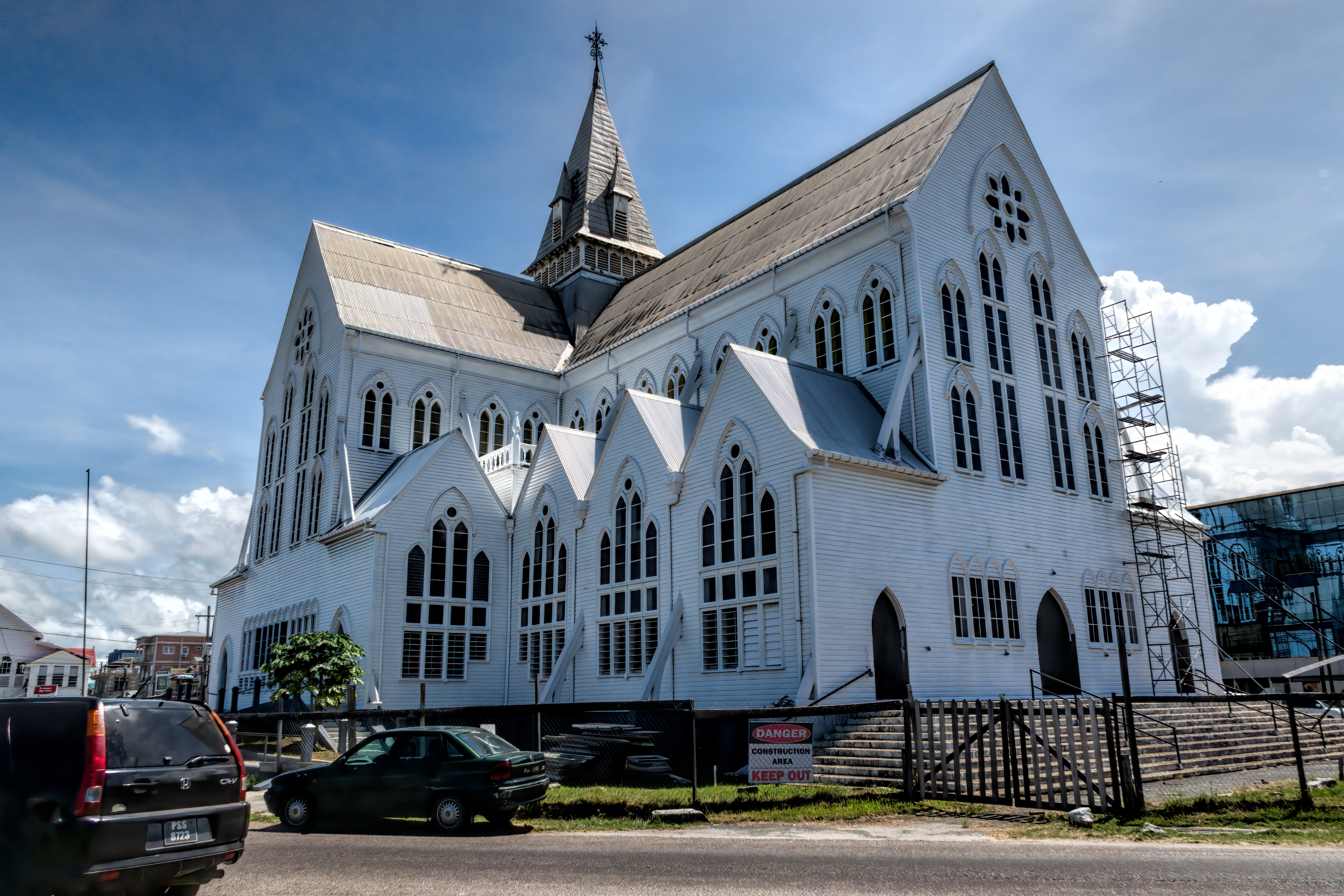

- Location within Guyana
- 6°48′46″N 58°09′49″W
- Location: Georgetown
- Country: Guyana
- Denomination: Anglicanism
- Website: stgeorges.org.gy

History
- Consecrated: 8 November 1894

Architecture
- Architect: Arthur Blomfield
- Years built: 1889-1894

Administration
- Province: Church in the Province of the West Indies
- Diocese: Guyana

Clergy
- Bishop: Charles A Davidson
- Dean: Charles A Davidson; Assistants: Thurston Riehl, George Spencer

St. George's Cathedral is an Anglican cathedral in Georgetown, Guyana. The church is of Gothic Revival timber construction and reaches a height of 43.5 metres (143 ft). It is the seat of the Bishop of Guyana.

St. George's was designed by Sir Arthur Blomfield and opened on 24 August 1892. The building was completed in 1899. It is located on Church Street in Georgetown and has been designated a national monument.

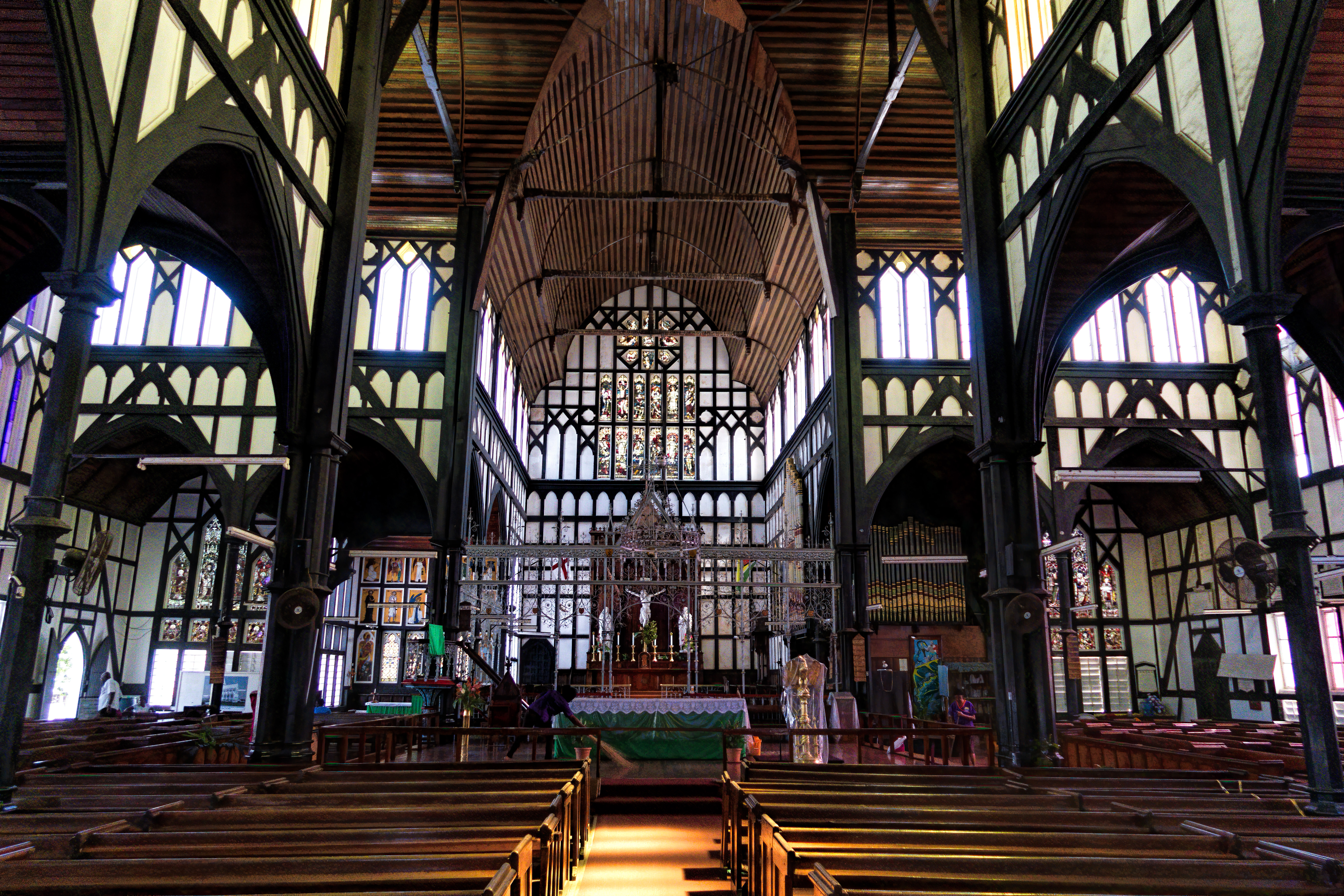
Interior of St. George's

== See also ==
- Tōdai-ji Temple, wooden house of worship in Japan
- Pagoda of Fogong Temple, wooden pagoda in China
- Religion in Guyana
- Category:Deans of St George's Cathedral, Georgetown
- List of tallest wooden buildings
