= Knolly Clarke =

The Very Reverend Knolly Ulric Clarke
- Dean Holy Trinity Cathedral
- Church: Anglican Church
- Diocese: Diocese of Trinidad and Tobago
- In office: 1994–2004
- Predecessor: Rawle Douglin
- Successor: Colin Sampson
- Previous posts: Priest in Charge St. Pauls Anglican Church; 1981–1994 San Fernando

Orders
- Ordination: 1961

Personal details
- Born: 5 January 1935 (age 91) Tunapuna, Trinidad and Tobago
- Denomination: Anglican
- Residence: Oasis Gardens, North Coast Road, Diego Martin, Trinidad and Tobago
- Spouse: Estella Millington-Clarke (married 1962)
- Children: Christopher, Cecile, Marcus
- Education: Tranquillity Secondary School, Codrington College, Barbados; Huron College, McGill University, University of the South

Knolly Ulric Alexander Clarke (born 7 January 1935) is a retired Anglican priest from Trinidad and Tobago. He served as Dean of Trinidad from 1994 to 2004.

== Early life ==
Clarke was born on 7 January 1935 in Tunapuna. His father worked with the Trinidad Government Railway and he attended primary school in Sangre Grande. He attended Tranquillity Secondary School, Port of Spain, and Progressive Private School. After leaving secondary school he taught at Richmond Street Boys’ Primary School and then went on to Codrington College, Barbados. At first, however, he wanted to be an engine driver: "My father was Station Master in the old days of the railway. My vocation started at Good Shepherd St Oswald Church, Caroni]], in Tunapuna as a server, and my mentor was Bishop Benjamin Vaughan, Dean of the Cathedral. After leaving school I taught two years at Richmond Street Boys’ Primary and then went to Codrington, where on completion of the Diploma in Theological Studies I was ordained Deacon at St Michael's Cathedral in Barbados, returned to Trinidad, and after 1961 priestly ordination was assigned as Assistant Priest at St. Stephen's in Princes Town". In Princes Town, Clarke met and married nurse Estella Millington, a union that has produced three children, Christopher Martin, Marisa and Marcus.

== Education and career ==
Clarke was ordained at first as deacon of St. Michael's Cathedral, Barbados in 1961 and then as priest in Trinidad also in 1961. He first served as Assistant Priest at St Stephen's in Princes Town. In 1963, Clarke went to All Saints in Port of Spain as assistant curate, during which time he decided to further his studies and obtained a Licentiate of Theology at the University of Western Ontario. On completion of his studies in Canada he returned to home to St. Stephen's where he served for a further five years. He then took up a scholarship to study at McGill University where he completed the Master of Sacred Theology in 1973. On his return to Trinidad he was again assigned to St Stephen's, he was made Canon in 1974 and was then assigned to St. Agnes Parish in St. James where he spent seven years. Clarke later spent 12 years at St Paul's in San Fernando. He was appointed Dean of the Cathedral in 1994. He obtained his Doctoral degree at Sewanee: The University of the South.

On retirement in 2004, Clarke worked as Associate General Secretary with the Caribbean Council of Churches. He currently serves as Priest in Charge at Christ Church, Cascade a small parish in suburban Port-of-Spain. He also coordinates and lectures in the Ethics and Moral Values programme at the Cipriani College of Labour and Co-operative Studies. Clarke is the Anglican representative on the Inter Religious Organisation of Trinidad and Tobago. Clarke also serves as Chairman and Dean of the Sehon Goodridge Theological Society a non-profit inter-denominational organization that seeks to promote theological study, interfaith dialog and named in honor of the late Archbishop of the Windward Islands Sehon Goodridge.

== Involvement in Trinidad and Tobago attempted coup (1990) ==
According to the Commission of Enquiry into the attempted coup of 1990 in Trinidad and Tobago, Clarke was enlisted to function as a go-between between the insurgent Jamaat-al-Muslimeen and the T&T army to relay the insurgents' demands and the army's responses. The Commission's report stated:

"We find that Canon Clarke at all material times functioned as a messenger relaying messages among Imam Abu Bakr, Bilaal Abdullah and Col. Theodore. He was never a mediator properly so called and did not function as a mediator."

The report went on to say that if it were not for the actions of Clarke as a messenger, there would have been more bloodshed during the tense, six-day standoff.

"Canon Clarke’s return to the Red House on Saturday afternoon probably prevented the murder of the hostages in Parliament. We are convinced that, if he had not returned with the amnesty document, Bilaal Abdullah would have made good his threat to have the NAR Parliamentarians executed."

== Honours ==
In 2002 an Honorary Doctor of Divinity was conferred upon him by University of Western Ontario. In 2007 he was awarded the Hummingbird Medal in Gold by Government of Trinidad and Tobago.
