= Queen's Royal College =

Coordinates: 10.6687°N 61.5193°W

- QRC
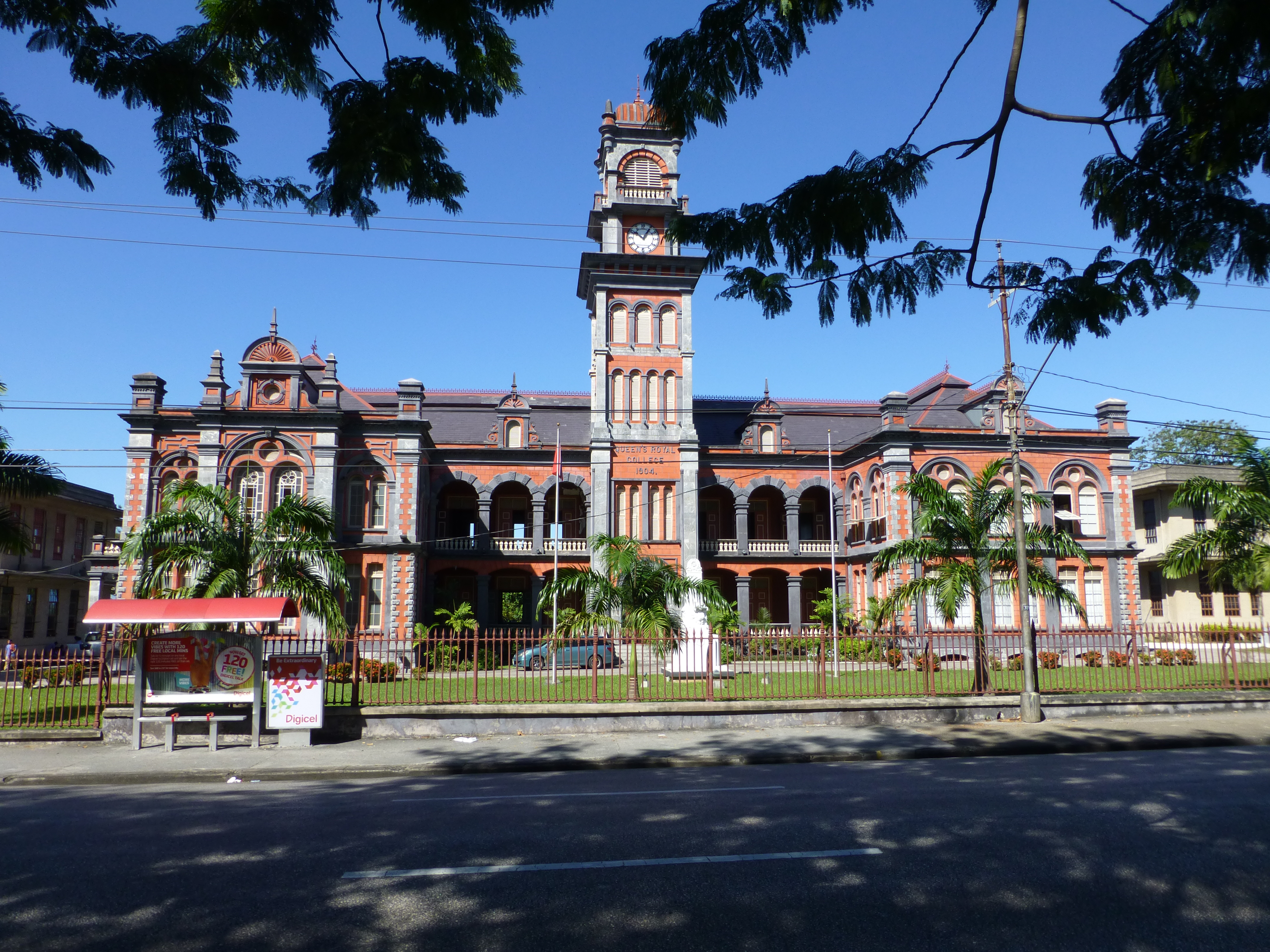
- QRC Main Building as seen from Queen's Park Savannah

Location
- 19 Maraval Road; Queen's Park West; Port of Spain; St.Clair; Port of Spain; Trinidad and Tobago

Information
- Former names: Queen's Collegiate School and Stuart Grammar School
- Funding type: Government
- Motto: Certant Omnes Sed Non Omnibus Palmam (All strive, but the prize is not for all)
- Religious affiliation: None
- Denomination: Non-denominational
- Patron saint: Monarch of the British Empire Queen Victoria(20 June 1837 – 22 January 1901)
- Established: 1859; 167 years ago
- Principal: David Simon
- Years offered: 7 years
- Gender: Male
- Enrollment: Approximately 725 (in 2010)
- Classes: 18
- Average class size: 25
- Schedule type: 6 day cycle
- Campus size: appx. 9 acres - 392,024 ft²
- Campus type: sprawling urban
- Houses: Naipaul Murray Williams Mottley Gran Gibbon James Phillip
- Student Union/Association: Student Body Government-Elected Yearly
- Color: Royal blue
- Slogan: Magnum est QRC (great is the college)
- Song: Sons of this Royal School Rejoice
- Sports: Football, Rugby, Field Hockey, Water Polo, Tennis, Dragon Boat Racing, Cricket, Track and Field, Chess, Checkers, Scrabble.
- Nickname: Royalian / Blue Blood
- Rival: Saint Mary's College, Port Of Spain
- Accreditation: CSEC
- Newspaper: This week at QRC (digital mad by QRC PTA)
- Communities served: Inter-school Christian Fellowship, Hindu Student Group
- Affiliation: Government of Trinidad & Tobago
- Alumni name: Old Boys' Association
- Nobel laureates: V. S. Naipaul
- Website: qrc.edu

Queen's Royal College (St.Clair, Trinidad), referred to for short as QRC, or "The College" by alumni, is a secondary school in Trinidad and Tobago. Originally a boarding school and grammar school, the secular college is selective and noted for its German Renaissance architecture, academic performance and alumni representation in sports, politics and science in Trinidad and Tobago and globally.

== History ==
The origin of QRC goes back to the Stuart Grammar School, at the corner of Duke and Edward Street in Port of Spain, whose Principal was Edward Stuart. In 1859, when a new "collegiate school" was being contemplated, Stuart was invited by the colonial government to be part of the enterprise. The Queen's Collegiate School opened later that year opposite what is now Lord Harris Square, then known as Billiards Orchard. QRC was originally a fee paying (British public school American private) school and was expressly secular.

The intention was, as Governor Arthur Hamilton-Gordon told the Legislative Council in 1870, "that its advantages should be open to those of every race and every religion, and that the education given should be of a decidedly superior character."

In 1870, the school became the Queen's Royal College and was housed in the supper room of the Prince's Building.

When the Government Farm moved from St Clair in 1899, part of the land was reserved as a new home for QRC through the intervention of acting Governor Sir Micah Fields.

The school, referred to in those days as Royal College, had 120 pupils, who did not wear a uniform but had to wear a hat or cap bearing the college crest. They learned algebra, geometry, arithmetic, Latin, French, English, geography, history and Greek or Spanish.

Today in Queen's Royal College uniforms are worn, and QRC projects and involvements usually involve a blue theme, due to the uniform of blue shirt jack and long khaki pants. In 2009, the school implemented a new dress uniform for formal occasions.

Its principal is David Simon.

== Architecture and history of the main block ==
The foundation stone was laid on 11 November 1902 by Courtney Knollys, who was the acting Governor of the day. The structure was designed by Daniel M. Hahn, who was Chief Draughtsman of the Public Work Department and an Old Boy of Queen's Royal College, during the period when the school was housed at the Princess Building. He is also noted for designing the nations Parliament building the Red House. The architecture of the building is German Renaissance in style, evident by the solid appearance. Constructed at a cost of 15,000 British pounds, 1,845,000.00 British pounds adjusted for inflation, the original building accommodated six classes for 30 boys each. The lecture hall could hold more than 500 persons at a time.

== General information ==
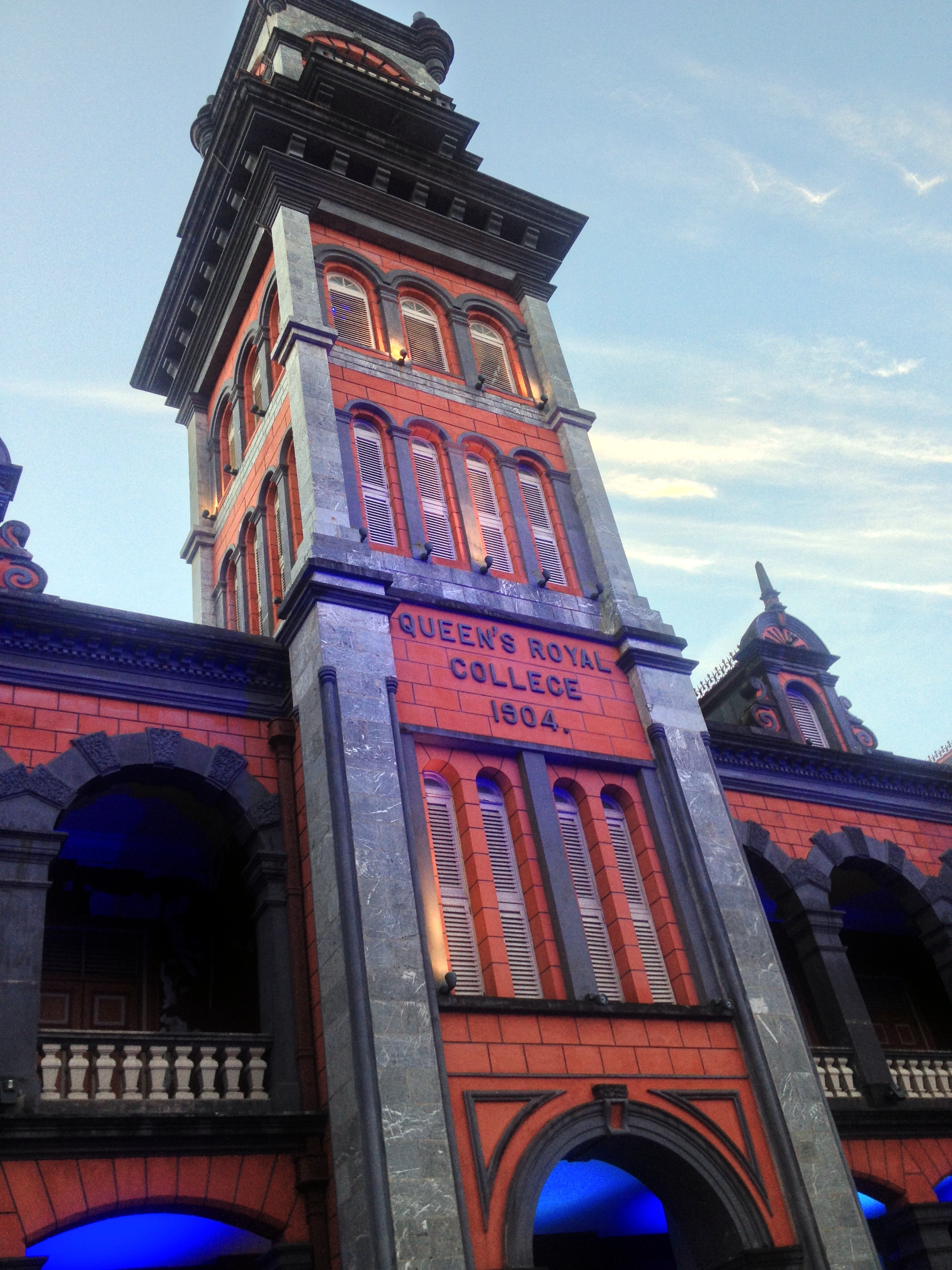
Queen's Royal College Clock Tower in January 2015

The main building itself is one of the Magnificent Seven, a group of historic buildings built in the early 1900s. The North and South buildings, known as the North Block and Science Block respectively, were built during the late 1930s. The school has its own pavilion and canteen, both located on the edge of its field, used in all seasons for various sports.

== Classes ==
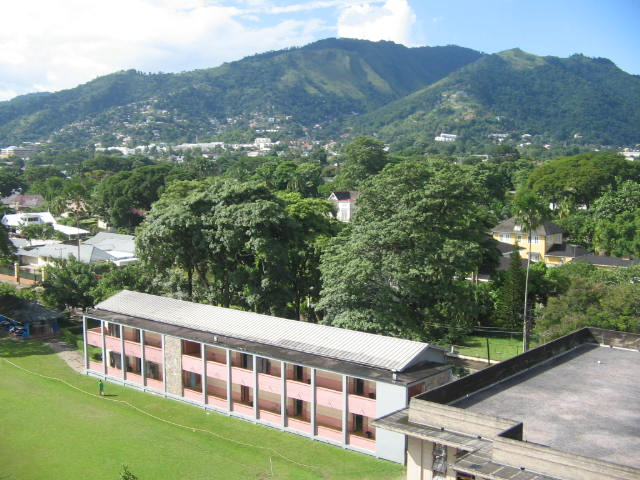
West Block of Queen's Royal College 2007, Port of Spain

Queen's Royal College, as a secondary school in Trinidad & Tobago, consists of classes from Form One through Form Six. The school can be termed a "seven-year" school but qualification into Form Six is based on the student's performance at the CSEC (Caribbean Secondary Education Certificate) examinations. Classes are categorized by name according to the word "ROYAL" but now excludes the letter "A", which was used for an accelerated class to what was then the GCE O-Level that students sat after four years rather than the usual five. Form One consists of three classes, 1R, 1O and 1Y whereas, Forms 2 through 5 consists of xR, xO, xY and xL where x represents the class number. All students in each class from forms 2–upper 6 are in the same school house. External students can also gain access into the Sixth Form Level based on their qualifications and other academic factors. On average, up to ten external students enter the Sixth Form level per year.

== Subjects offered at Form Six level ==
The following subjects apply to both Lower Six (year one) and Upper Six (year two). Subjects are usually divided into Unit 1 and Unit 2 with the exclusion of Caribbean Studies which is usually assigned to the first year in Form Six or Lower Six and Communication Studies to the second year in Form Six or Upper Six. All subjects are of the Caribbean Advanced Proficiency Examination (CAPE) format and students are allowed to do a minimum of four subjects, but exceptions are sometimes accepted.

As of July 2012

BUSINESS STUDIES

- Accounting
- Economics
- Management of Business (Business Studies or M.O.B)

MODERN STUDIES

- Art and Design
- French
- History
- Literature in English
- Sociology (offered as a Modern subject although it is a Science)
- Spanish

SCIENCE STUDIES

- Biology
- Chemistry
- Geography
- Physics
- Pure Mathematics
- Applied Mathematics

COMPULSORY SUBJECTS

- Caribbean Studies
- Communication Studies

== Notable alumni ==
- Clive Abdulah (b. 1927), former Bishop of Trinidad
- Lloyd Best (1934–2007), economist, essayist, politician, scholar. Founder of the "Plantation school" of economics
- Ralph de Boissière (1907–2008), novelist
- Marc Burns (born 1983), athlete and 2008 Olympic medallist – 4 × 100 m relay
- Rudranath Capildeo (1920–1970), mathematician, politician
- Stephen Cumberbatch (1909-2011), archdeacon
- Sir Robert Falconer (1867-1943), Canadian academic and fifth president of the University of Toronto
- Dr E. F. Gordon (1895–1955), physician, civil-rights activist and labour leader in Bermuda
- Jehue Gordon (b. 1991), track and field athlete
- Boscoe Holder (1921–2007), artist, dancer and choreographer
- Geoffrey Holder (1930–2014), actor, dancer and choreographer
- Darcus Howe (1943–2017), broadcaster, writer and civil liberties campaigner
- Karl Hudson-Phillips (1933–2014), jurist, politician; former judge of the International Criminal Court and former Attorney General of Trinidad and Tobago
- C. L. R. James (1901–1989), pre-eminent Caribbean philosopher, historian, novelist, essayist, political theorist and cricket writer. James writes about his schooldays at QRC in his classic cricket memoir Beyond a Boundary (1963)
- Nathaniel James (b. 2004), professional footballer (Portland Hearts of Pine, Trinidad and Tobago national football team)
- Ian McDonald (b. 1933), Guyana-based writer
- Kynaston McShine (1935–2018), museum curator; recognized as the first person of colour at a major American museum
- Peter Minshall (b. 1941), artist, Trinidad carnival masman, designer of opening ceremony for the Olympic Games of Atlanta 1996, Emmy Award-winner
- Wendell Mottley (b. 1941), 1964 Olympic silver medallist and politician; former Minister of Finance
- Deryck Murray (b. 1943), West Indian wicket-keeper in cricket
- Shiva Naipaul (1945–1985), novelist and journalist
- Sir V. S. Naipaul (1932–2018), Nobel Prize–winning author. QRC is memorialised in his masterpiece novel A House for Mr. Biswas (1961)
- George Maxwell Richards (1931–2018), engineer, academician, former President of Trinidad and Tobago
- Richard Thompson (b. 1985), athlete and 2008 Olympic medallist – 100m; 4 × 100 m relay
- Air Vice-Marshal Claude McClean Vincent (1896–1967), Royal Air Force officer
- Eric A. Williams, geologist, former politician and Minister of Energy
- Eric Eustace Williams (1911–1981), historian, first Prime Minister of Trinidad and Tobago regarded as the Father of the nation.

== School House and related activities system ==
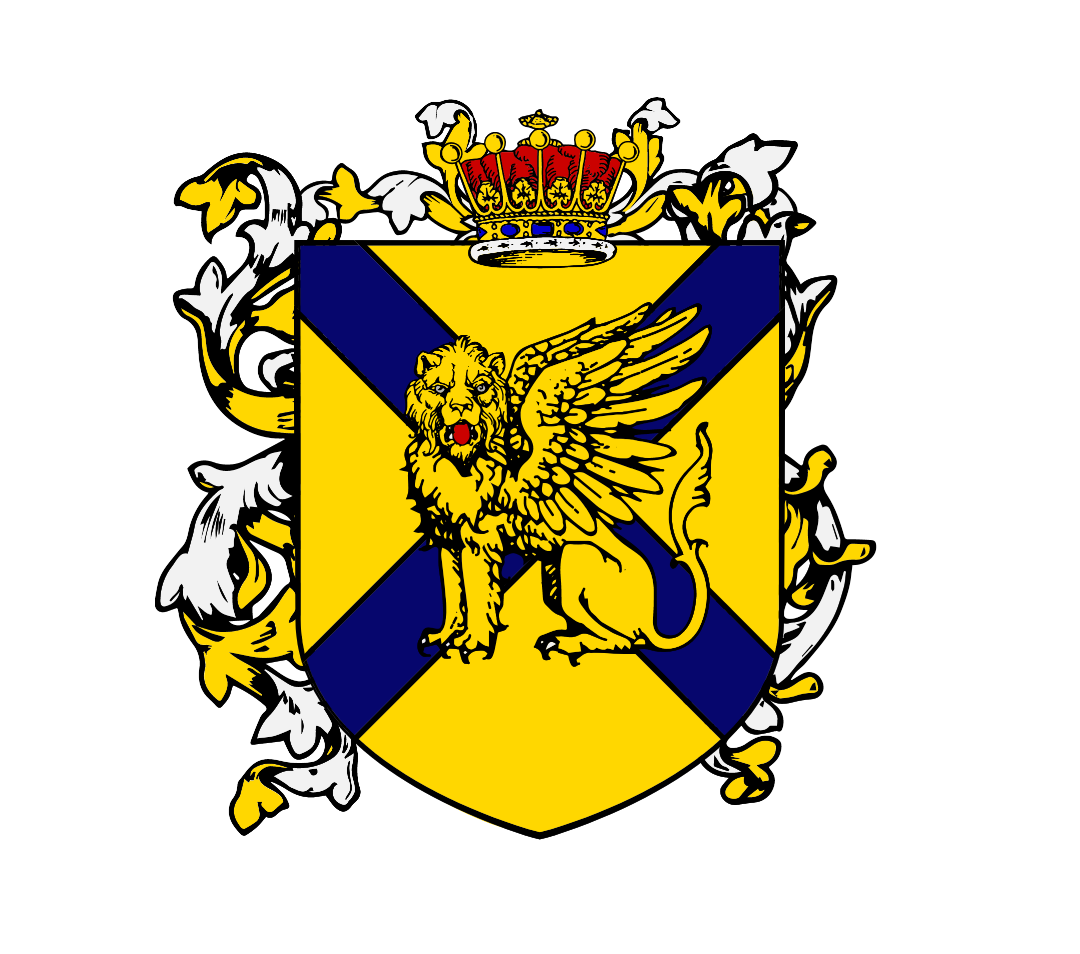
House Naipaul Murray( Yellow)

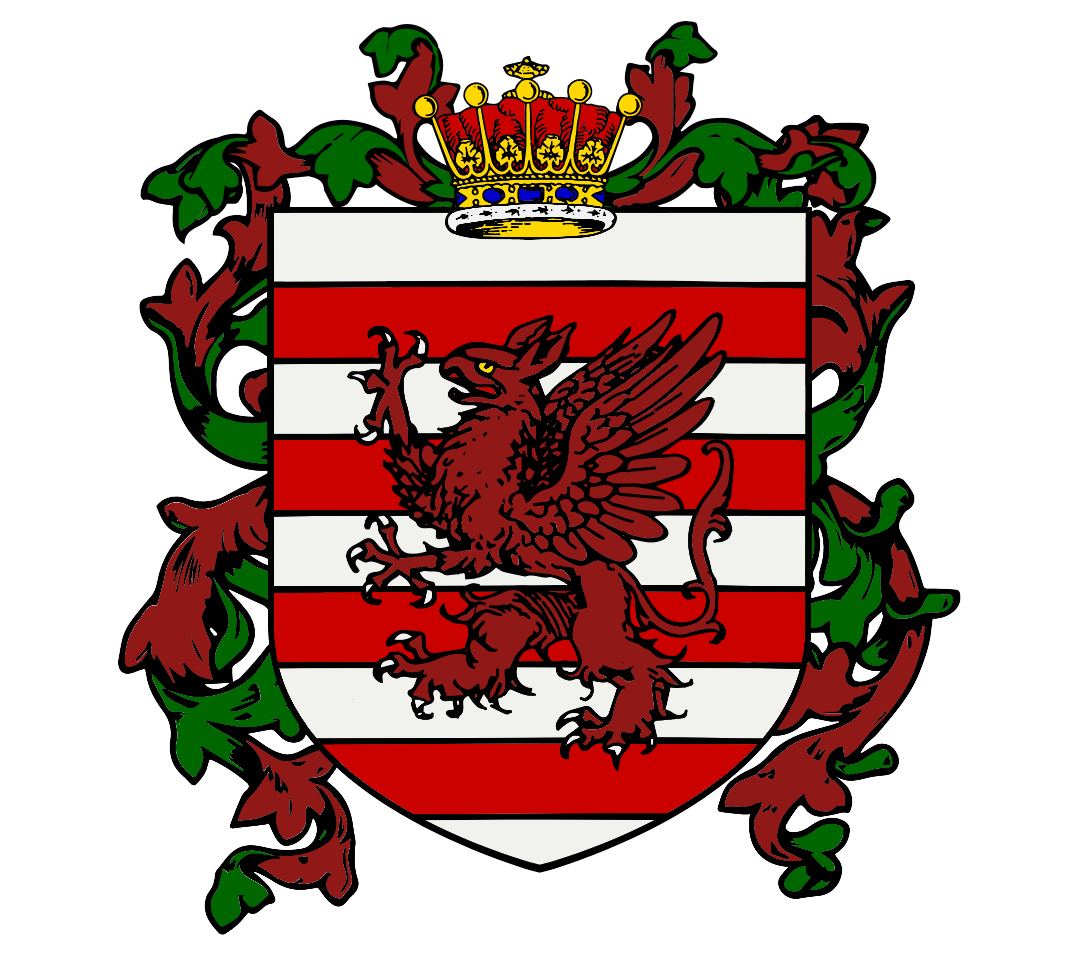
House Grant Gibbon(Red)

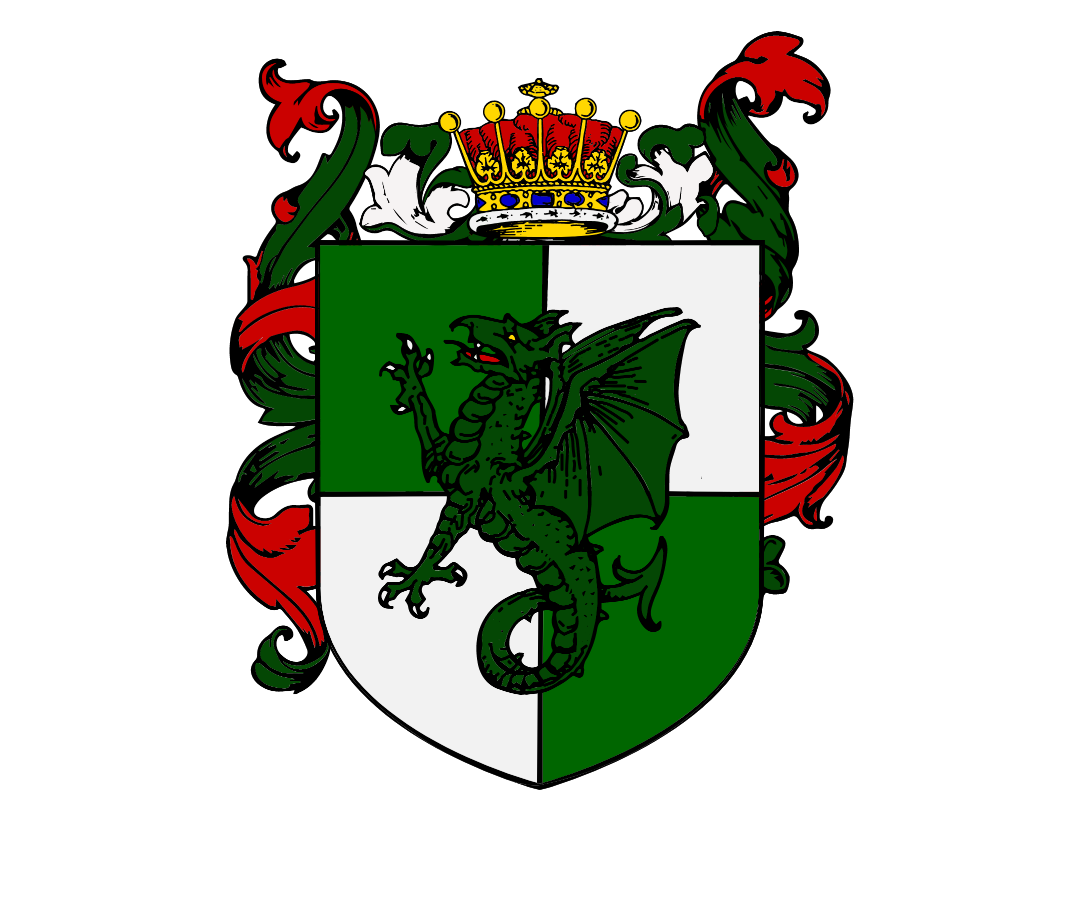
House Williams Mottley (Green)

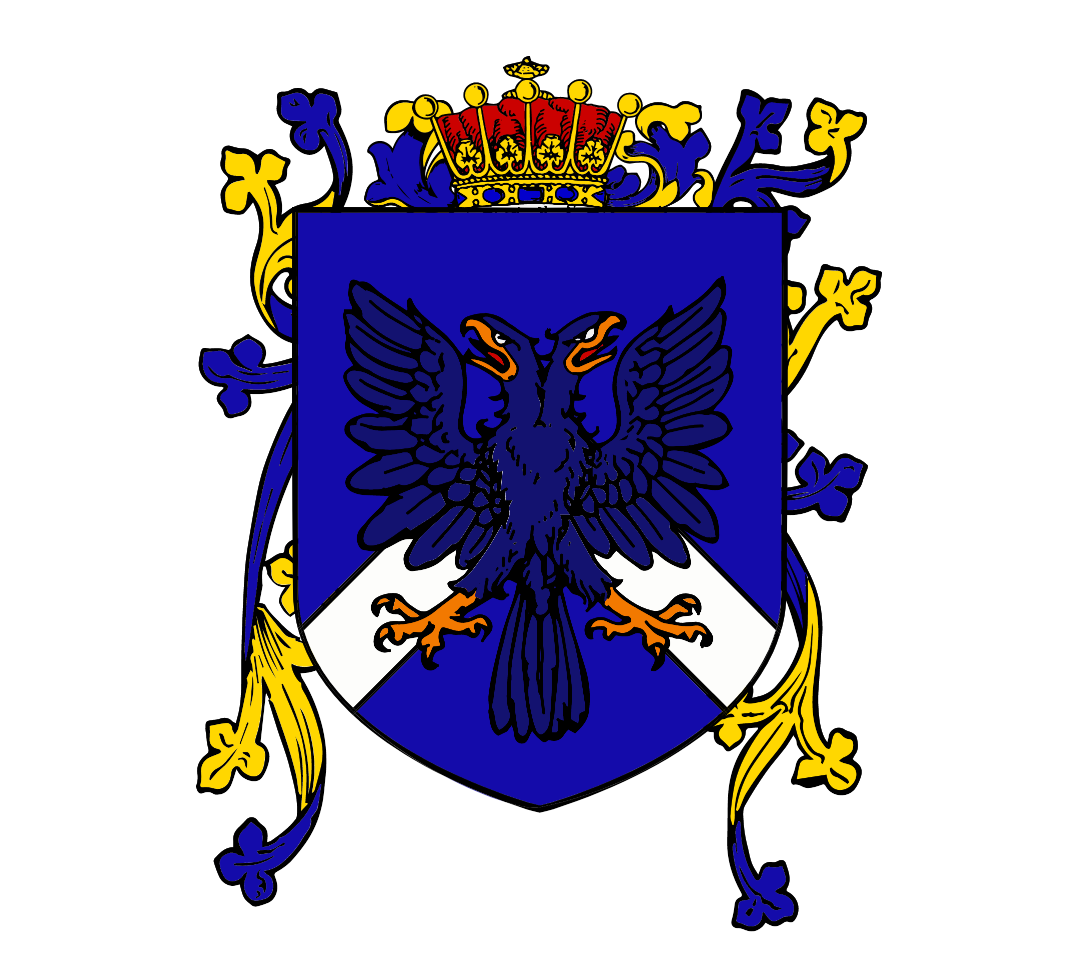
House James Phillip (Blue)

All students in each class from forms 2 to upper 6 are in the same school house. The Houses are named after the most notable alumni of the college.

For example, House Naipaul Murray is named after Sir Vidia Naipaul FRAS TC and Deryck Murray.

Houses compete in internal Competitions Cross Country and "One Lap Savannah", to win points for their house leading up to Sports Day. Sports Day is a yearly series of competitive games in track and field, water polo, marathon and March Pass.

Leading up to Sport Day, each house has designated days for bake sales to raise funds for march pass uniforms. House captains are appointed to organize athletes and train persons in marching. Teachers are also designated houses yearly based on the house of their form class. It is customary for all form one students to March, and for forms 2–upper 6 it is voluntary.

Houses also compete in the yearly Royal Games that include Royal League (Soccer) and Royal Hoops (Basketball).

=== House colours ===
- House Naipaul Murray – Golden Yellow
- House James Phillip – Prussian Blue
- House Williams Mottley – Emerald Green
- House Grant Gibbon – Vermillion

== See also ==
- List of schools in Trinidad and Tobago
- Royal college
