= Edward Holt (priest) =

Dean of Trinidad

Edward John Holt MBE (29 September 1867 – 6 November 1948) was Dean of Trinidad from 1914 to 1947.

Holt was born into an ecclesiastical family in Grantham and educated at St Augustine's College, Canterbury. He was ordained in 1890 and served curacies in the Windward Islands and Port of Spain before coming to Trinidad's Cathedral in 1895.

== Notes ==
Church of England titles
Preceded by Augustus Elder Smith	Dean of Trinidad; 1914–1947	Succeeded by Harold Beardmore
