= Richard Sampson (disambiguation) =

Richard Sampson (died 1554) was an English bishop.

Richard Sampson may also refer to:

- Richard Sampson (author) (1896–1973), English author who wrote under the name Richard Hull
- Richard Sampson (cricketer) (1860–1927), English cricketer
- Richard Sampson (MP) (fl. 1417), English MP for Maldon (UK Parliament constituency)
- Richard Sampson (politician) (1877–1944), Australian politician
- Richard Ian Colin Sampson (born 1955), Anglican cleric
