= Alfred Harrison (priest) =

Dean of Trinidad from 1968 to 1973

Alfred Tuke Priestman Harrison (8 May 1921 – 3 August 1995) was Dean of Trinidad from 1968 to 1973.

Harrison was born in 1921 and educated at Christ Church, Oxford. He was ordained in 1951 and served two curacies in Taunton. He was vicar of La Brea, Trinidad and Tobago before his time as dean and vicar of St Thomas the Apostle, Leesfield afterwards.

== Notes ==
Church of England titles
Preceded by Frederick David Chaplin	Dean of Trinidad; 1968–1973	Succeeded by Rawle Douglin
