= Magnificent Seven (Port of Spain) =

Group of seven mansions in Port of Spain, Trinidad and Tobago

Coordinates: 10.671°N 61.519°W

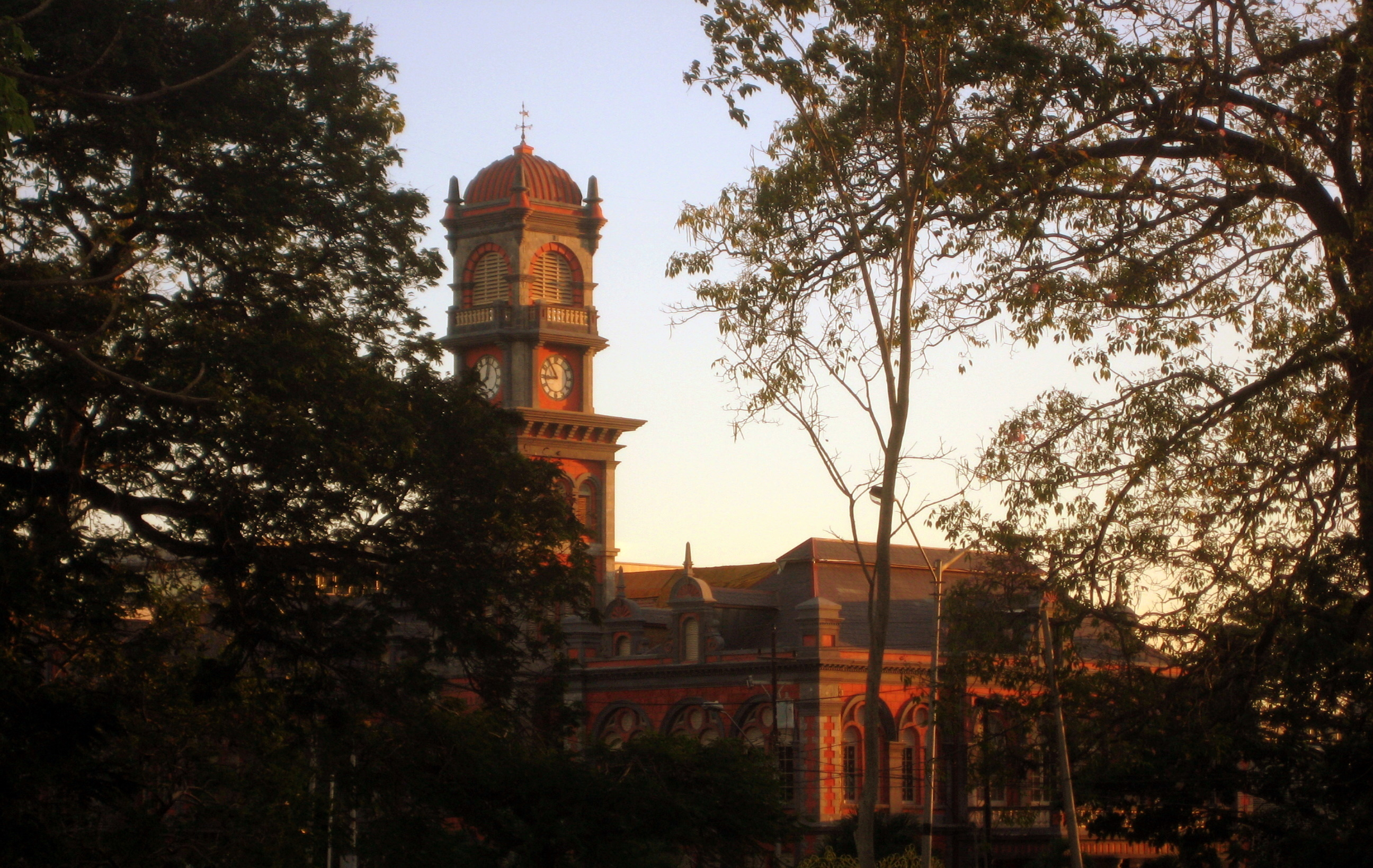
Queen's Royal College in 2009

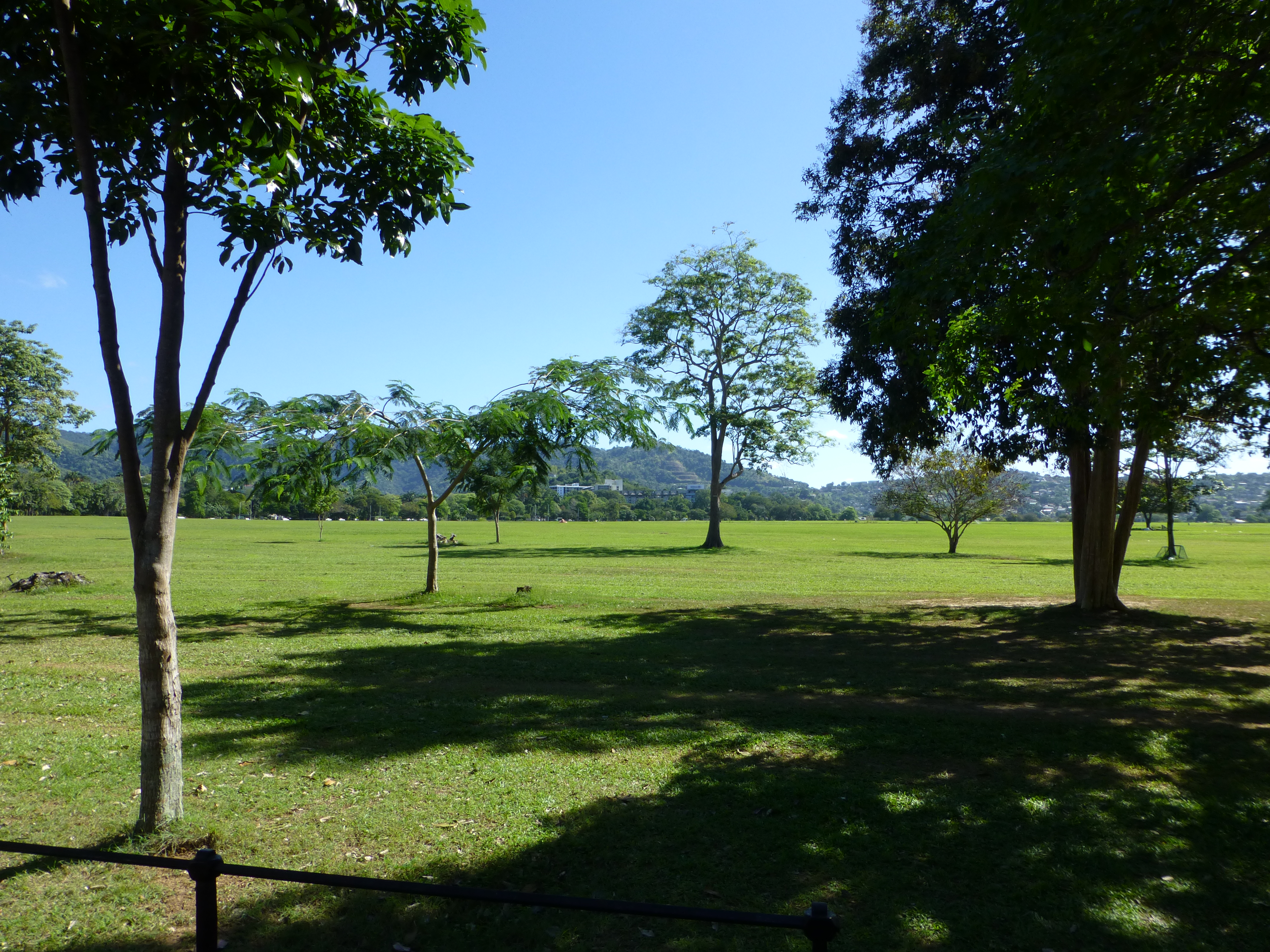
Queen's Park Savannah

The Magnificent Seven is a group of seven mansions located west of the Queen's Park Savannah in northern Port of Spain, Trinidad and Tobago on Maraval Road in the St Clair neighborhood. They were built between 1902 and 1910 on land that was previously used as a government stock farm and are listed as heritage sites at the National Trust of Trinidad and Tobago. Stollmeyer's Castle was the first building in the neighborhood and took several years to complete, as was typical of the Magnificent Seven.

The structures were designed in an array of architectural styles including French Colonial, Scottish baronial, Indian Empire, and Moorish Mediterranean styles—often blended with Caribbean architecture. Many have unusual elements, like the chiming clock and lighted clock tower of Queen's Royal College. Stollmeyer's Castle is said to be modeled after a wing of Balmoral Castle. Hayes Court, a French Colonial style building, has contemporary Scottish cast iron elements and traditional Demerara windows. White Hall (Note: White Hall is also written Whitehall.) is made of natural white limestone of Barbados. Some of the structures were made of imported materials, like Italian marble and Scottish cast iron elements.

Most were originally built as residences and kept within families for decades. Archbishop's House was built as, and remains, the official residence of the Archbishop of Port of Spain. The Anglican Bishop to Trinidad resided in Hayes Court. Queen's Royal College was built as a secondary school for boys.

White Hall was used as the Office of the Prime Minister from 1963 to 2009. White Hall and Stollmeyer's Castle fall under the purview of the Office of the Prime Minister. The two buildings had restoration work so that they could be used by foreign dignitaries visiting Port of Spain. Both buildings were commandeered by the United States Armed Forces during World War II. Most of the Magnificent Seven Houses retain the aesthetics of the original designs. Of the buildings, Milles Fleur is the one most in disrepair due to extended periods where it was not occupied or maintained.

== Overview ==
The properties are listed by the National Trust of Trinidad and Tobago as examples of the "city's remarkable architectural heritage." Some of the buildings are in good condition, but others have been in need of repair, like Mille Fleurs, which was beginning to be restored in 2015.

The mansions around the Savannah are often forced into European terms to describe the architectural styles but really they are all eclectic, each one trying to outdo the others... They don’t follow the rules. Instead, they borrow from various countries and styles and then adapt the whole to a tropical aesthetic and utility. Trinidadian architecture expresses our free spirit, multi-ethnic and cultural origins. Our desire to be different from our neighbours and our creative individuality."

—Rudylynn Roberts, president of Citizens For Conservation (CFC)

This period of construction of the Magnificent Seven occurred just after the turn of the 20th-century, following a "disastrous" fire of 1895 in Port of Spain, after which non-flammable materials like metal, concrete, and cast iron were used in the construction new buildings. George Brown of the Trinidad Trading Company, who built Mille Fleurs, did much of the rebuilding after the fire and is responsible for much of the metalwork used in the city at that time.

== Buildings ==
=== Queen's Royal College ===
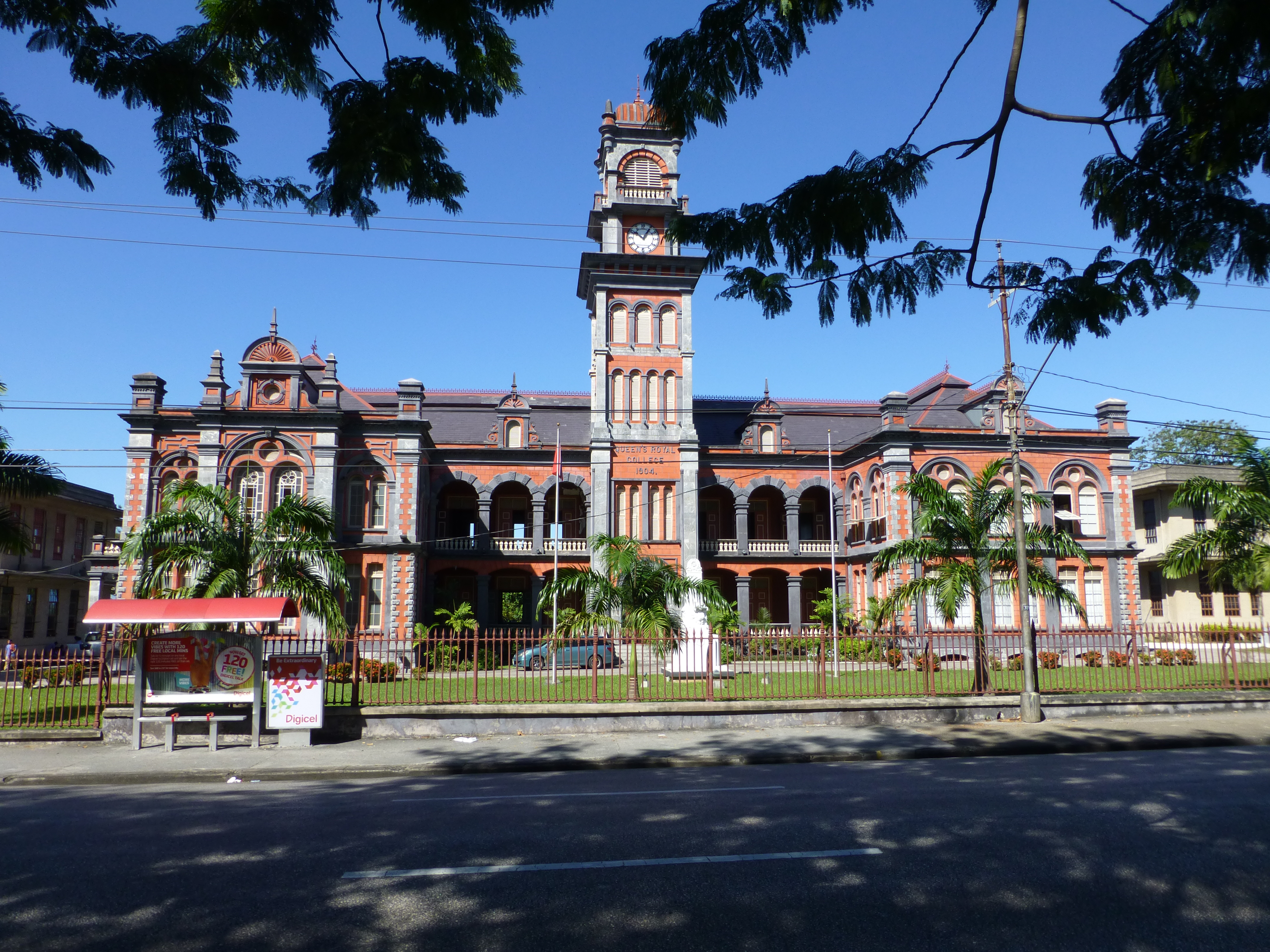
Queen's Royal College

Queen's Royal College, a National Trust of Trinidad and Tobago listed building, was built on the corner of St Clair Avenue and Maraval Road beginning 11 November 1902, when the foundation stone was placed by the acting governor of the day, Sir Courtney Knollys. Daniel Meinerts Hahn, a former student of Queen's Royal College at the Princes Building, designed the German Renaissance style building, which includes a chiming clock and lighted clock tower. He was the chief draughtsman of the Public Works Department. According to the National Trust, "Queen's Royal College is considered to be the most striking of the buildings of the Magnificent Seven."

The secondary school, designed with a tropical interior, was built with six classrooms and a lecture hall for 500 people. Less than 200 students attended the school each year. As of 2016, the building is being restored, including the classroom's hand-painted murals. It is listed as heritage site and protected under the National Trust Act.

=== Hayes Court ===
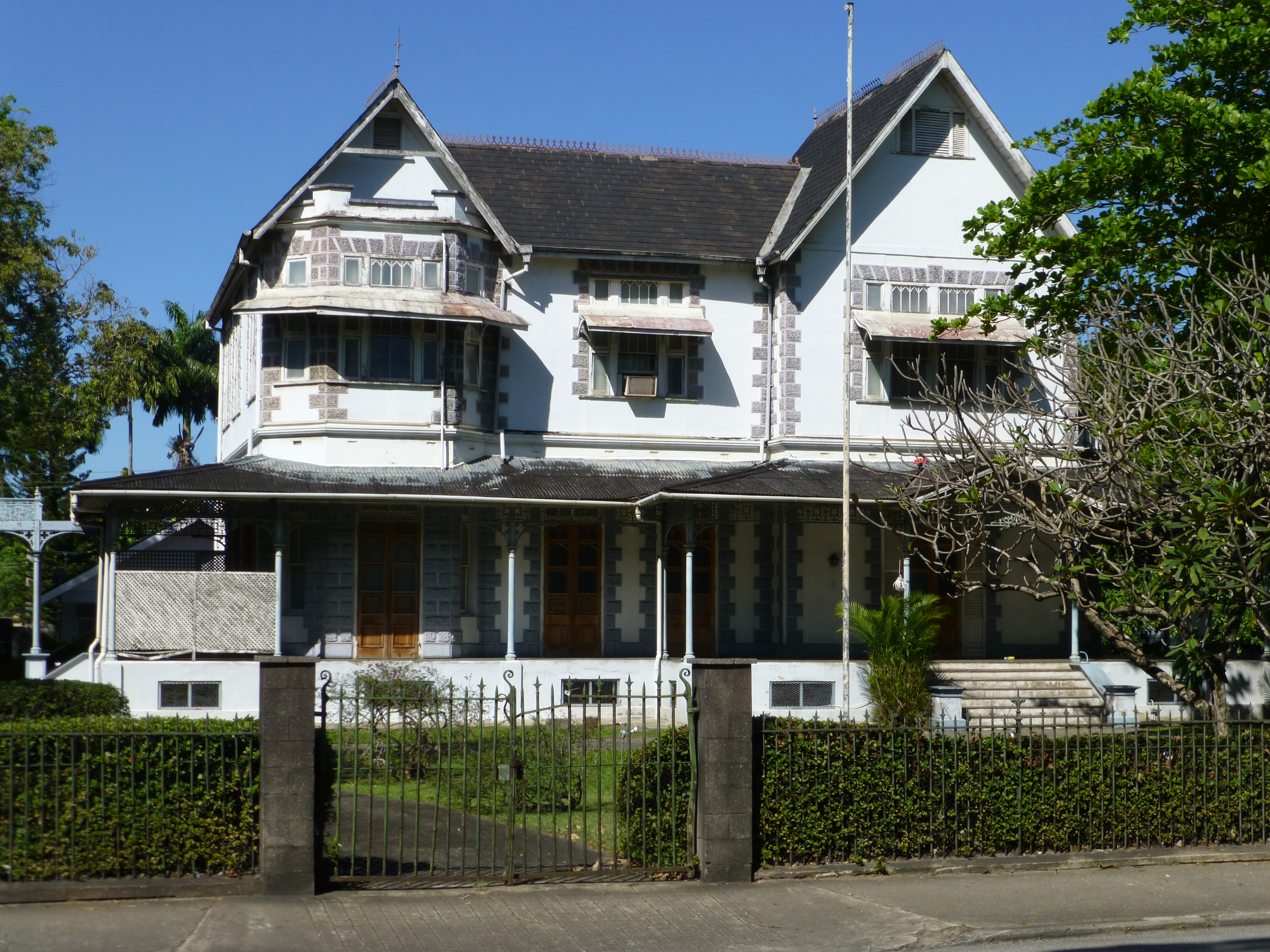
Hayes Court

Hayes Court, at 21 Maraval Road, was built as a residence for the Anglican Bishop to Trinidad. An anonymous gift was made in 1908 by two men to pay for the construction of the building, which was built in a French Colonial architectural style. The design incorporates contemporary Scottish cast iron elements in decorative beams and columns for the veranda, which wrap around all but the west side of the house. On the western façade of the building are traditional Demerara windows. The mansion was designed by Taylor and Gillies and completed in 1910. The residence was named for Bishop Thomas Hayes, who served as archbishop in Trinidad and Tobago from 1889 to 1904. Right Reverend John Francis Welsh was the first resident. It is listed as heritage site and protected under the National Trust Act.

=== Mille Fleurs ===
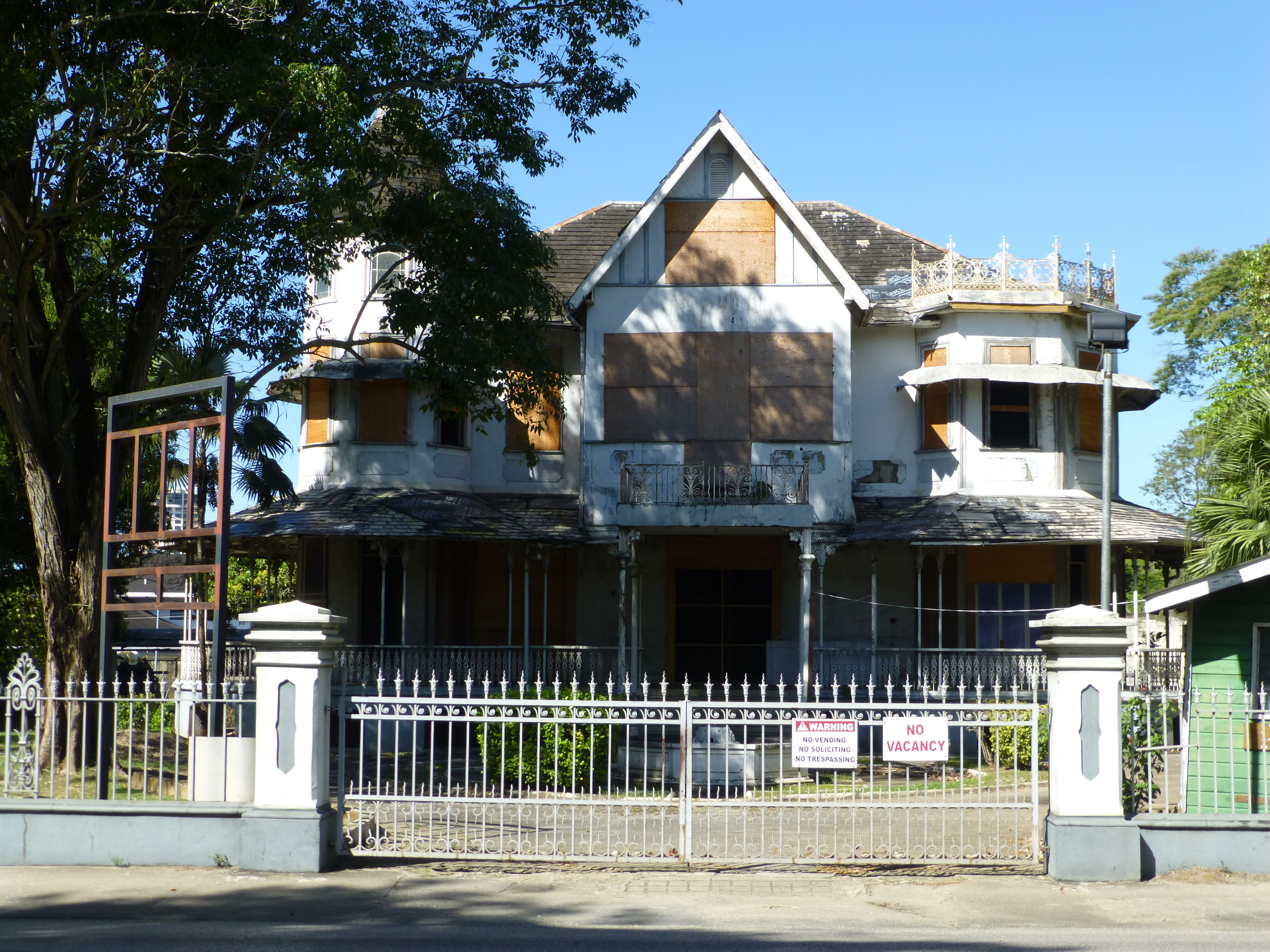
Mille Fleurs

Mille Fleurs at 23 Maraval Road was built and named by the wife of Dr Enrique Prada (1867–1944) in 1904. Dr Prada oversaw the construction of the French Provincial house by George Brown of the Trinidad Trading Company. The Pradas lived in the house until 1923, when they sold it to Joseph Salvatori. It remained in the family until the Salvatori's daughter, Mrs Pierre Lelong sold it to George Malouk in 1973. He sold it to the government of Trinidad and Tobago in June 1979.

It served several purposes over the years and then was under the jurisdiction of the Ministry of Culture until June 2000, when it was assigned to the Ministry of Environment. The National Trust states, "Although Mille Fleurs is less ostentatious as some of its neighbours, the quality of finish and detailing is perhaps of a far higher quality; the intricately carved balusters and the marble treads and risers to both the main and secondary staircases, the elaborate cast iron columns and brackets." However, after a period of time when it was not occupied or maintained, it deteriorated significantly. It has since been restored, and in August 2020 it was handed over to the National Trust. It is listed as a heritage site and protected under the National Trust Act.

=== Ambard's House ===
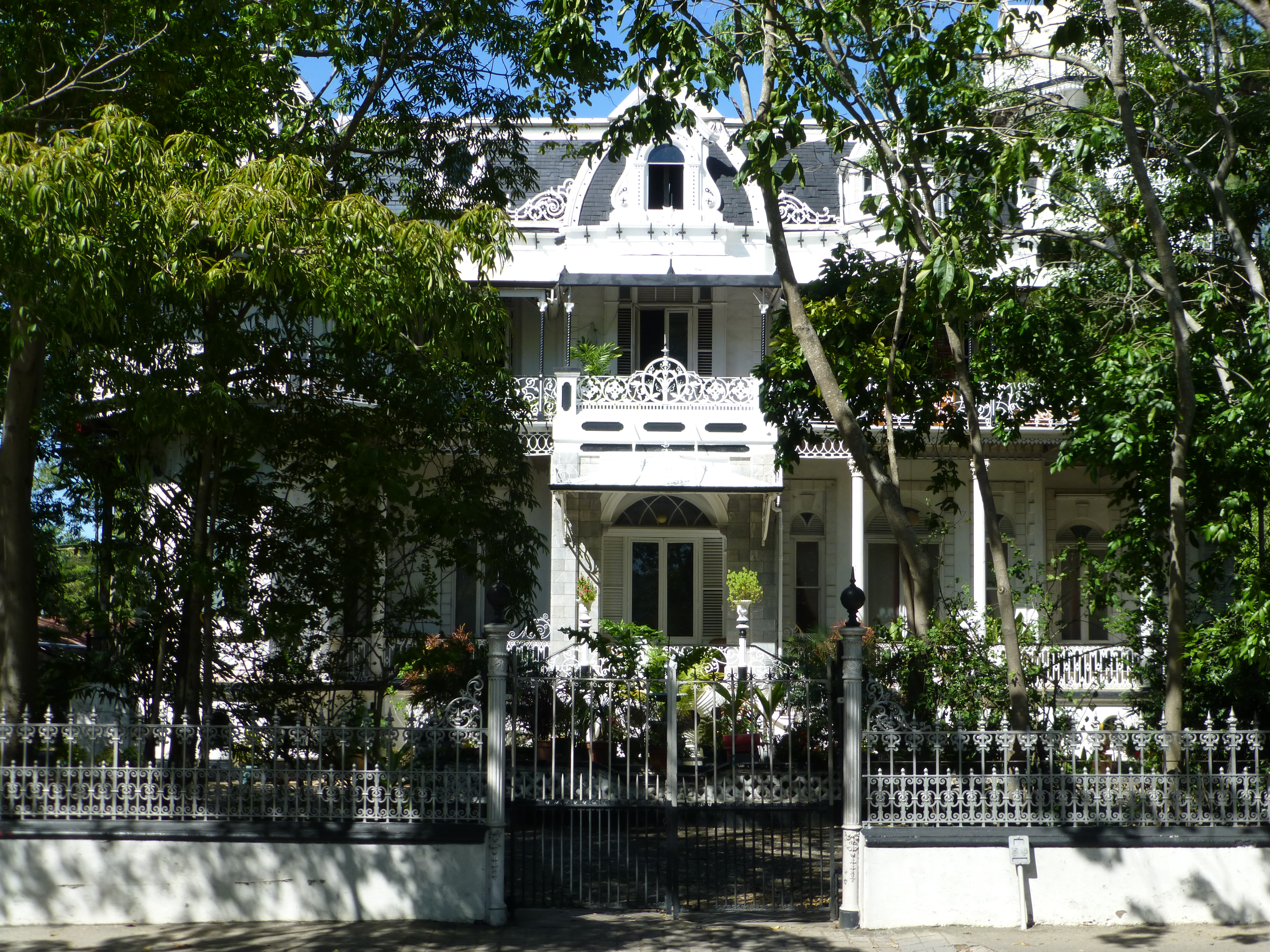
Ambard's House, also known as Roomor House

At 25 Maraval Road is Ambard's House, built by Lucien F Ambard who the French Second Empire style house designed by a French architect. He had it constructed in 1904, using wood from the Ambard family estate in Erin for the rafters. He also imported Scottish cast iron elements, Italian marble, and French tiles for its construction.

Ambard lost the house to the Gordon Grant and Company in 1919, when he was unable to make the mortgage payments. It was inhabited by an American, William Pettigrew Humphrey, and his family from 1925 to 1940. The house was purchased from Humphrey by Timothy Roodal and it has stayed within the family. It is now the home of Roodal's granddaughter, Dr Yvonne Morgan and her family, and is now also called Roomor House, based upon a combination of the Roodal and Morgan family names. The house has been well-maintained and true to the original design. It is listed as a heritage site and protected under the National Trust Act.

=== Archbishop's Palace ===
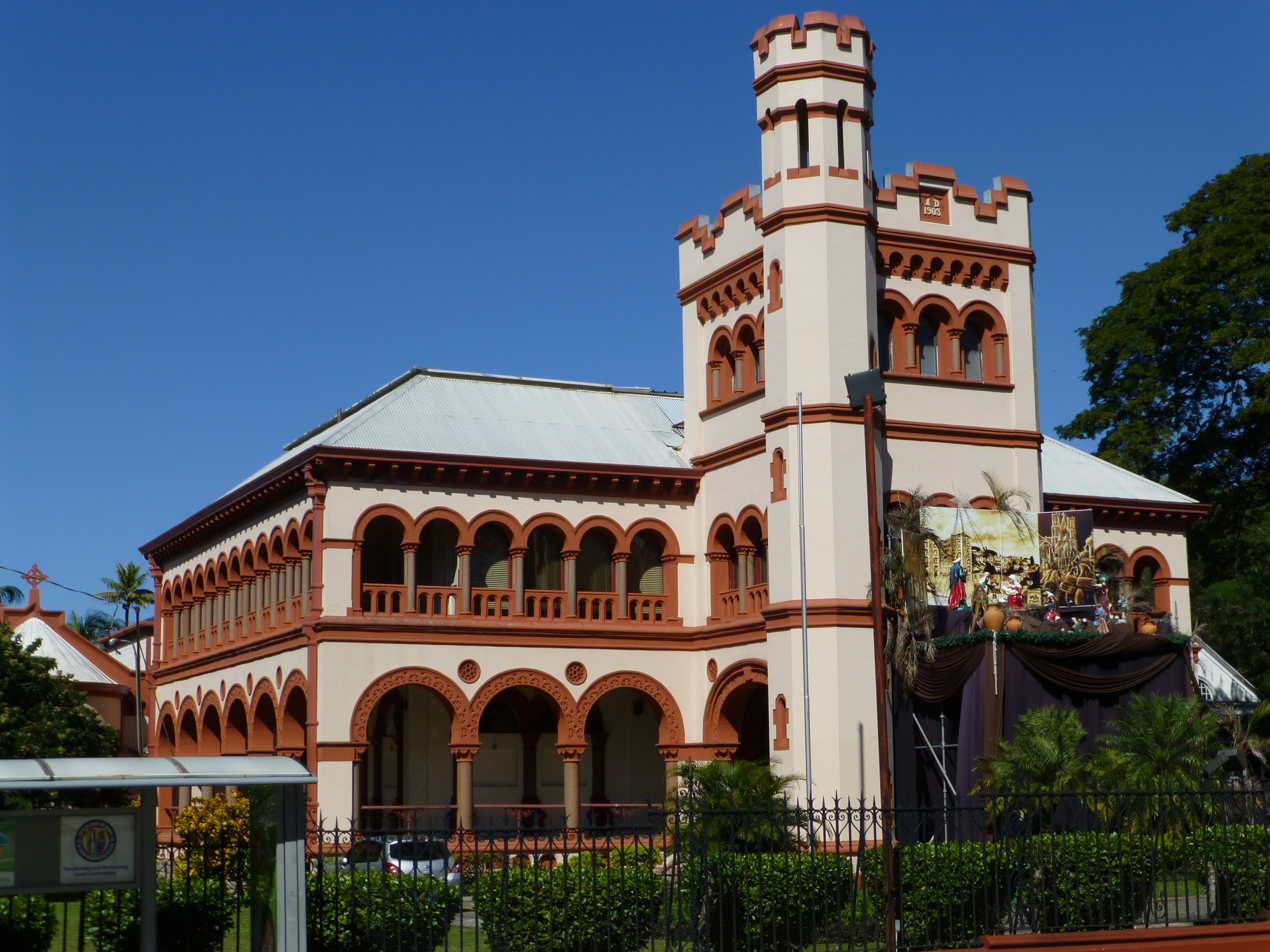
Archbishop's Palace

The Archbishop's House, at 27 Maraval Road, is the official residence of the Archbishop of Port of Spain, which, as of 2016, is The Most Reverend Joseph Everard Harris, CSSP. It was built in 1903 by Patrick Vincent Flood, the Fifth Archbishop of Port of Spain. At that time other residences were being built on Maraval Road by wealthy French Creoles. The building, designed by an Irish architect in an Indian Empire architectural style, had a chapel and sacristy on the first floor. A porch wraps around the building. On the east façade, there is a porte-cochère with wide bay and six additional, narrower bays. The west side has nine bays, and there are six bays on the south and north façades. The property had a summer house and stables, which was accessed by an extended gallery on the west side of the main building. The construction was completed in 1904 by George Brown of the Trinidad Trading Company.

It was remodeled extensively from 1968 to 1969, based upon the architectural design of Sonny Sellier. A chancery was built in the west side of the building and a new apartment was built at the site of a summer house and stables. In some cases, the renovations deviated from the original aesthetic of the architectural design. For instance, aluminum sliding doors replaced the double wooden doors on the ground floor. The contractor was Rev Father Kevin Devenish. Monsignor Anthony Pantin, the first Trinidadian-born Archbishop, lived in the house after the renovation was completed in 1969. It is listed as heritage site and protected under the National Trust Act.

=== Whitehall ===
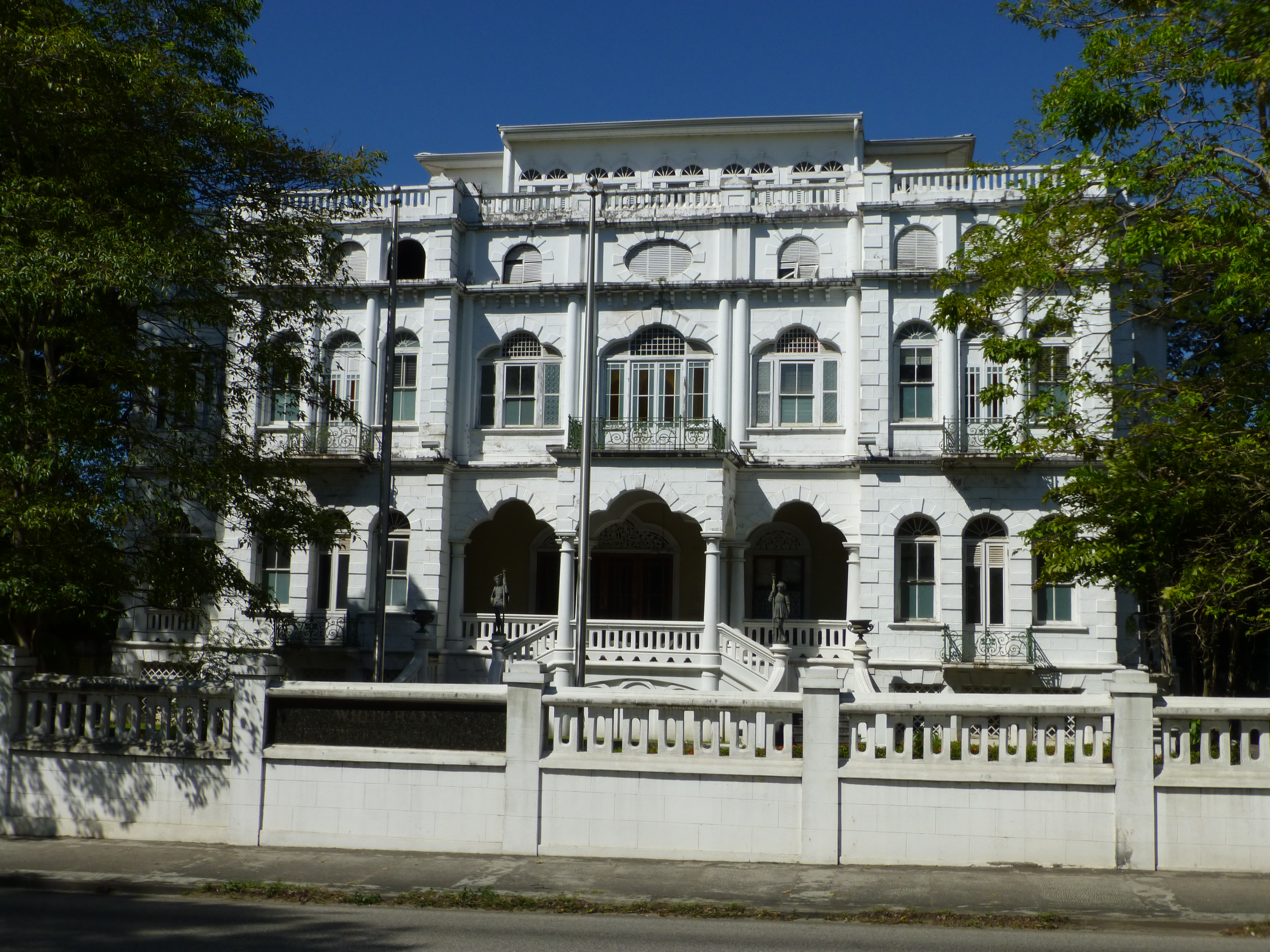
Whitehall

White Hall, located at 29 Maraval Road, is the largest residence on the street and is the current Office of the Prime Minister of Trinidad and Tobago. Originally known as Rosenweg, it was built by Joseph Leon Agostini, a cocoa planter, who designed the home himself.

Agostini's family was from Corsica, and the influence is reflected in the house's Moorish Mediterranean inspired architecture. Construction began in 1904, by James Moore of Barbados, and it took three years to complete the project, except for the roof that was not completed until 1910. The exterior was built using white limestone from Barbados. It was a three-storied building with four reception halls, a library, drawing room, wine cellars, and large galleries. There were six bedroom suites with large dressing rooms and advanced, modern bathrooms. The house had long corridors, wide-sweeping marble staircases, and a service lift between floors.

Agostini died in 1906, but his family occupied the house until they were unable to make payments on the mortgage and it was foreclosed by William Gordon Grant in 1910, according to the National Trust. Some believe that the Agostinis never lived in White Hall, because the cocoa industry, which was strong when construction began, collapsed while the house was being built.

An American, Robert Henderson, purchased the house and renamed it White Hall, for the coral stone exterior of the building. The National Trust states that he added a "delightful variety in the furnishings of the interior was added to the refined dignity of the exterior." Henderson's heirs, the Seigert family, possessed the house until World War II, when it was commandeered by the United States Forces as the Air Raid Precaution headquarters. It was rented for use as a cultural centre by the British Council in 1944.

Although it was returned to the Hendersons after the war, they never lived in it again. It was then rented for a number of purposes—including public libraries, National Archives, and Government Broadcasting Unit—until 1949. It was not used again until it was purchased by the Government of Trinidad and Tobago in 1954. It was used by the Pre-Federal Interim Government in 1957, before the formation in 1958 of the West Indies Federation. Hon. Dr. Eric Williams, Trinidad and Tobago's first Prime Minister, used it as the Office of the Prime Minister from 1963 to 2009. During that time, there was a restoration of the building in 2000. It is listed as heritage site and protected under the National Trust Act. Beginning about 2008, the Urban Development Corporation (UDeCOTT) renovated the building so that it could be used by visiting foreign dignitaries.

=== Stollmeyer's Castle ===
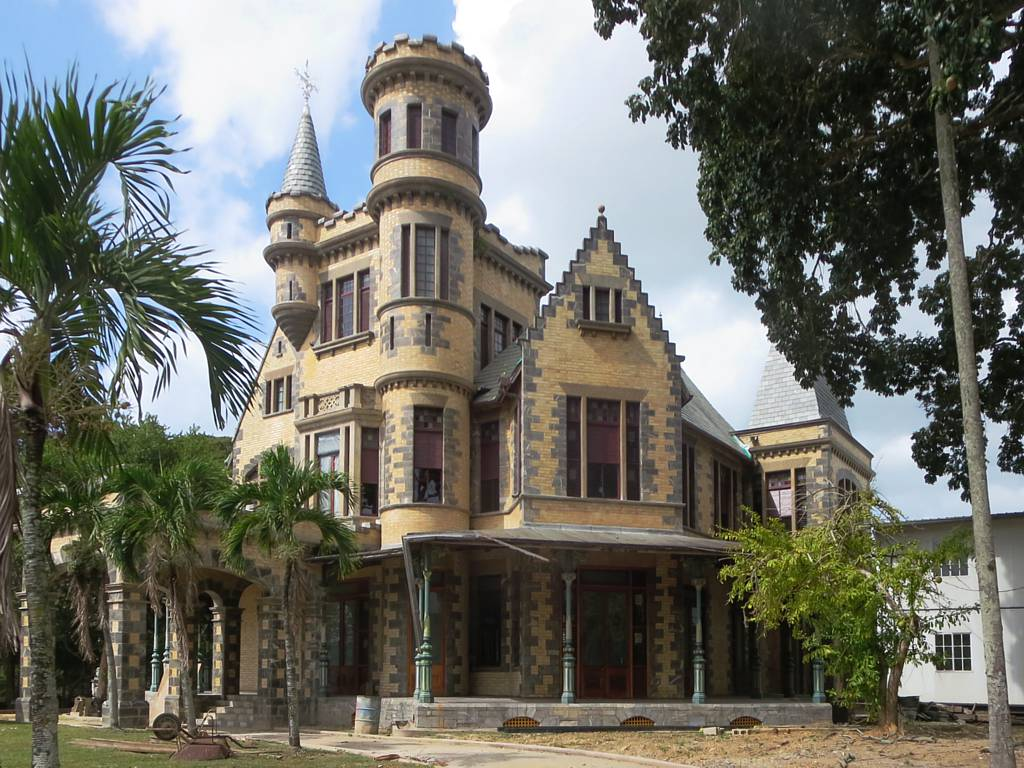
Stollmeyer's Castle

Stollmeyer's Castle, also called Killarney, is a Scottish Baronial style residence located at 31 Maraval Road. Built on land that was previously used as the government stock farm, it was the first residence built in the St Clair neighborhood. It is named for Charles Fourier Stollmeyer, who hired the Scottish architect Robert Gillies to design the house, which is said to be patterned after a wing of Balmoral Castle. The two-year construction project began in 1902. When his wife said that she preferred a simpler home, Stollmeyer gave the house to his son, Conrad. His wife named it for Killarney, Ireland.

The property, like White Hall, was commandeered by the United States Forces, who called it "The Castle", during World War II. It then began to be called Stollmeyer's Castle. After the war, it stayed within the Stollmeyer family until 1972, when it was bought by an insurance executive, Jessy Henry A Mahabir. Seven years later, the government of Trinidad and Tobago owned the building. In the late 1990s, the Citizens for Conservation restored the building. It is under the care of the Office of the Prime Minister, and is a heritage site that is protected under the National Trust Act. A restoration project began in 2008 to ensure that the structure passed updated building codes and was restored for use by visiting foreign dignitaries.

== Sources ==
- Cheney, David M. (November 19, 2016). "Archdiocese of Port of Spain". catholic-hierarchy.
- Crain, Edward E. (1994). Historic Architecture in the Caribbean Islands. University Press of Florida. p. 81. ISBN 978-0-8130-1293-3.
- MacLean, Geoffrey. "White Hall (Rosenweg)". Citizens for Conservation TT.
- National Trust of Trinidad and Tobago (January 18, 2016). "Ambard's House". National Trust of Trinidad and Tobago.
- National Trust of Trinidad and Tobago (January 18, 2016). "Archbishop's Palace". National Trust of Trinidad and Tobago.
- National Trust of Trinidad and Tobago (January 18, 2016). "Hayes Court". National Trust of Trinidad and Tobago.
- National Trust of Trinidad and Tobago (January 18, 2016). "Mille Fleurs". National Trust of Trinidad and Tobago.
- National Trust of Trinidad and Tobago (January 18, 2016). "Queen's Royal College". National Trust of Trinidad and Tobago. Archived from the original on January 8, 2023.
- National Trust of Trinidad and Tobago (October 6, 2015). "Stollmeyer's Castle". National Trust of Trinidad and Tobago.
- National Trust of Trinidad and Tobago (January 18, 2016). "White Hall". National Trust of Trinidad and Tobago.
- Surtees, Joshua (February 16, 2015). "Trinidad's forgotten architectural gems". The Guardian.
- Trinidad and Topago Newsday staff (August 26, 2008). "The rich history of Whitehall and Stollmeyer's Castle". Trinidad and Topago Newsday.
