= Augustus Smith (priest) =

Barbadian cricketer

Personal information
- Born: 17 October 1844; Saint Michael, Barbados
- Died: 8 January 1916 (aged 71); West Kensington, England
- Source: Cricinfo, 17 November 2020

Augustus Elder Smith (17 October 1844 – 8 January 1916) was an Anglican priest who served in two senior leadership positions within the Diocese of Trinidad and Tobago during the late nineteenth and early twentieth centuries.

Smith was educated at Codrington College, Barbados and ordained in 1868. He played in three first-class matches for the Barbados cricket team from 1864 to 1872. After a curacy at St Silas, Barbados he was Rector and Dean of Holy Trinity Cathedral, Port of Spain; and Archdeacon of Trinidad from 1902 until 1914.

He died on 8 January 1916 at West Kensington.

== See also ==
- List of Barbadian representative cricketers
