= Demerara window =

Colonial architecture-style window

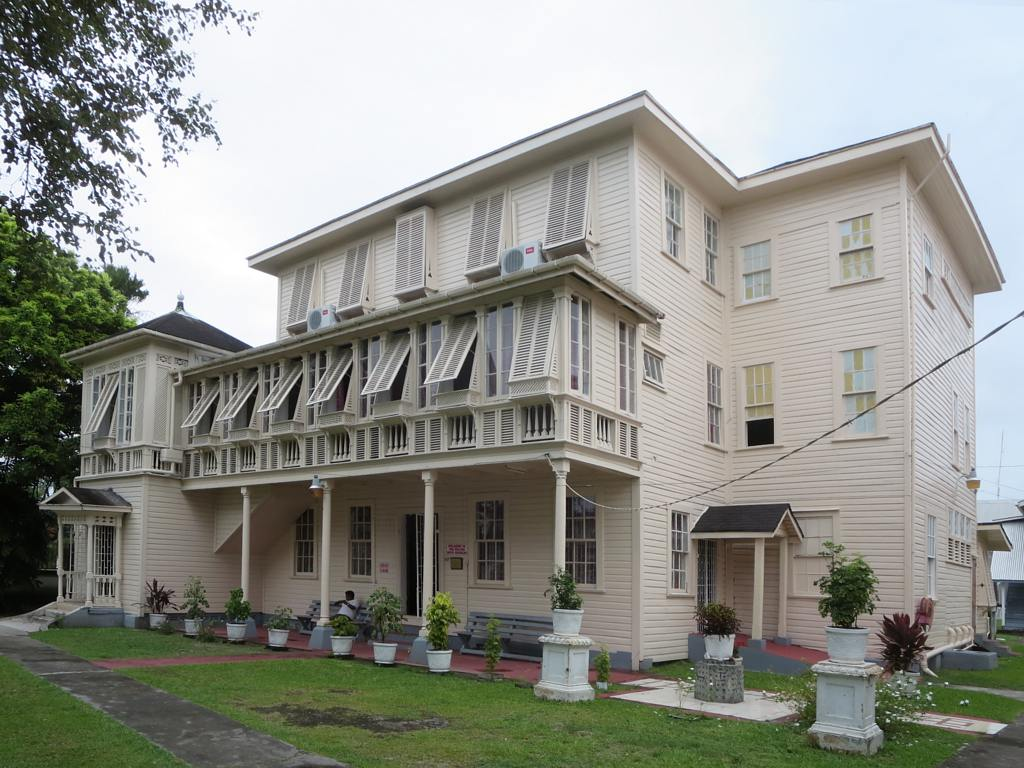

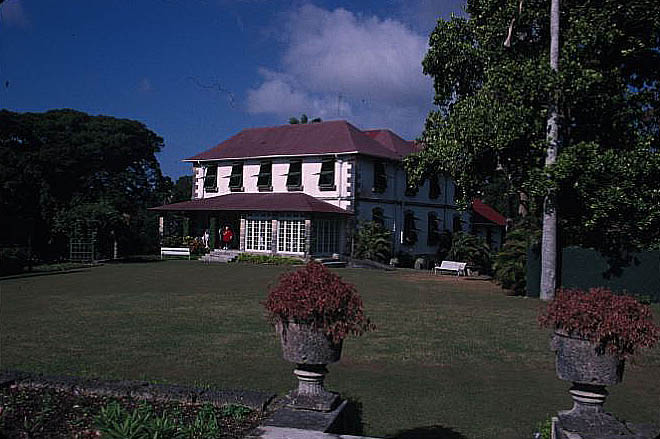
Francia Great House, Barbados, has Demerara windows.

Demerara windows were built primarily into 18th- and 19th-century Colonial architecture-styled buildings (Note: It was also used into the 20th century, such as Hayes Court (1910), one of the Magnificent Seven Houses in Trinidad and Tobago and the Francia Great House (late 19th century or early 20th century).) to cool homes in hot climates, such as Guyana, before the invention of air conditioning. Demerara is a historical region of Guyana.

The window design includes perforated sides and louvres to block direct sunlight. They are shuttered sash windows with the shutter hinged at the top so it could be propped open, sloping outward. They were generally propped open with a stick. At the window sill, a container of ice, water, or a potted plant helps cool warm air as it passes through the window into the building. The windows are generally fitted in the upper floors. Initially, this type of window was just used in the homes of the wealthy, but spread over time to the homes of other classes of people.

They were generally made of pine because the wood was less likely to move than native timbers in heat and humidity. It was generally made with twelve panes, which is a Georgian-style architectural detail.

In other parts of the Caribbean, particularly the British colonies and territories such as Grenada, the name came to be generally applied to a window that opens outwards from hinges at the top.

== See also ==
- Airflow window
