= Colin Sampson =

Colin Sampson may refer to:

- Colin Sampson (priest)
- Colin Sampson (police officer)
