= Richard Rawle =

Richard Rawle was Bishop of Trinidad and Tobago from 1872, and Dean of its cathedral from 1878, until his death in 1889.

Richard Rawle was born in 1812 and educated at Trinity College, Cambridge. After graduation, he was ordained in 1839 and accepted the rectory of Cheadle, Staffordshire. From 1847 to 1864 he was Principal of Codrington College Barbados and then (until his elevation to the episcopate) Vicar of Tamworth. He died on 10 May 1889.

== Notes and references ==
Church of England titles
Preceded by Inaugural appointment	Bishop of Trinidad; 1872–1889	Succeeded by James Thomas Hayes
