= David Chaplin =

Frederick David Chaplin (9 November 1920 – 19 December 1999) was Dean of Trinidad from 1961 to 1968.

Chaplin was born on 9 November 1920, and educated at Corpus Christi College, Oxford. He was ordained in 1951 and began his ecclesiastical career with a curacy in Glastonbury. He was Chaplain of Wells Theological College from 1955 to 1957 and its Vice Principal from then until his appointment as Dean. Afterwards he worked firstly for the World Council of Churches and then held he held various administrative posts within the Anglican Communion.

Chaplin died on 19 December 1999, at the age of 79.

Church of England titles
Preceded by Benjamin Noel Young Vaughan	Dean of Trinidad; 1961–1968	Succeeded by Alfred Tuke Priestman Harrison
