= David Abdulah =

Trinidad and Tobago trade unionist, economist and politician

- Born: Jamaica
- Education: University of the West Indies at St. Augustine (BA)
- Occupations: Trade unionist, economist and politician
- Known for: General Secretary of the Oilfields Workers' Trade Union; leader of the Movement for Social Justice
- Parent: Clive Abdulah (father)

David Abdulah is a Trinidad and Tobago trade unionist, economist and politician. He served as the General Secretary of the Oilfields Workers' Trade Union (OWTU), and is the current leader of the Movement for Social Justice (MSJ). Abdulah served as a government senator from 2010 to 2012, during the 10th Republican Parliament.

== Early life and education ==
David Abdulah is the son of retired Anglican bishop Clive Abdulah and his wife Mariko, who was Canadian of Japanese ancestry. Born in Jamaica, while his father was serving as a parish priest in a rural community there, he attended the University of the West Indies at St. Augustine, in Trinidad, obtaining a B.A. degree in mathematics and economics. His political and labour activism began during his student days at St. Augustine.

== Career ==
Abdulah worked for the OWTU from 1978 until his retirement in 2016. He served as its Chief Education and Research Officer, and was Secretary General of the union from 2008 to 2016. He also served as president of the Federation of Independent Trade Unions and Non-Governmental Organisations (FITUN) until 2012, when he chose not to stand for re-election.

The MSJ was party to the Fyzabad Accord that formed the People's Partnership (PP), and after the PP's victory in the 2010 general elections Abdulah was appointed to the Senate as a government senator representing the MSJ. After the resignation of Errol McLeod, the party's political leader, from the MSJ in January 2012, Abdulah took over as interim political leader of the MSJ. In June, the MSJ under Abdulah's leadership withdrew from the PP government.

Abdulah was the MSJ candidate for the Pointe-à-Pierre seat in the 2020 general elections. He placed third of four candidates behind the United National Congress's David Lee and the People's National Movement's Daniel Dookie. The MSJ party did not contest the 2025 general elections.
