= Calvin Bess =

Trinidad and Tobago bishop

Calvin Wendell Bess
- Bishop of Trinidad
- Church: Anglican Church in the Province of the West Indies
- Diocese: Diocese of Trinidad and Tobago
- Installed: 2001
- Term ended: 2011
- Predecessor: Rawle Douglin
- Successor: Claude Berkley

Orders
- Ordination: 1966
- Education: Codrington College, Barbados

Calvin Wendell Bess is a former Bishop of Trinidad and Tobago.

Educated at Codrington College, Barbados, he was ordained in 1966 and began his ecclesiastical career with a curacies at Scarborough, Tobago and Holy Trinity Cathedral in Port of Spain Next he was Priest in charge at Priest in Charge of St. Patrick's Church in Mt. Pleasant on Tobago before returning to Trinidad St. Paul's Church, San Fernando and then Holy Cross Church, Marabella, before his elevation to the episcopate in 2001 which he retired after ten years' service in 2011.

Anglican Communion titles
Preceded by Rawle Douglin	Bishop of Trinidad; 2001–2011	Succeeded by Claude Berkley
