= Clive Abdulah =

Trinidadian-born Anglican bishop (born 1927)

- Born: Clive Orminston Abdulah; 5 June 1927 (age 99); Woodbrook, Port of Spain, Trinidad
- Education: Queen's Royal College; University of Pennsylvania; University of Toronto
- Occupation: Anglican bishop
- Spouse: Mariko Abdulah
- Children: 3, inc. David Abdulah
- Awards: Hummingbird Medal (Gold)

Clive Orminston Abdulah (born 5 June 1927) is a retired Bishop of Trinidad who continues to serve the Church as an assistant bishop and a member of the Anglican Consultative Council.

== Biography ==
Born in Woodbrook, Port of Spain, Trinidad, Abdulah attended Rosary Boys' School and Queen's Royal College, before continuing his education at the Universities of Pennsylvania (BA, 1950) and the University of Toronto's Trinity College.

He was ordained in 1954 and began his ecclesiastical career with a curacy in Kingston, Jamaica. He was then rector of Highgate and rural dean of St Mary in the same country before his elevation to the episcopate. He was the first black bishop of the Anglican church in Trinidad and Tobago and was the first West Indian bishop to serve on the board of directors of the Anglican Centre in Rome, Italy (from 1992 to 1995).

A noted Freemason, Abdulah has spoken out about political deadlock in Trinidad.

== Personal life ==
With his wife Mariko, to whom he was married for 69 years until her death in 2022, Abdulah had three sons: David, Kenneth and Gregory.

== Awards ==
Abdulah's awards include the Hummingbird Medal (Gold) and an honorary degree of Doctor of Letters (DLitt) from the University of the West Indies.

Anglican Communion titles
Preceded by James Hughes	Bishop of Trinidad; 1969–1991	Succeeded by Rawle Douglin
