= National Trust of Trinidad and Tobago =

Coordinates: 10.653°N 61.517°W

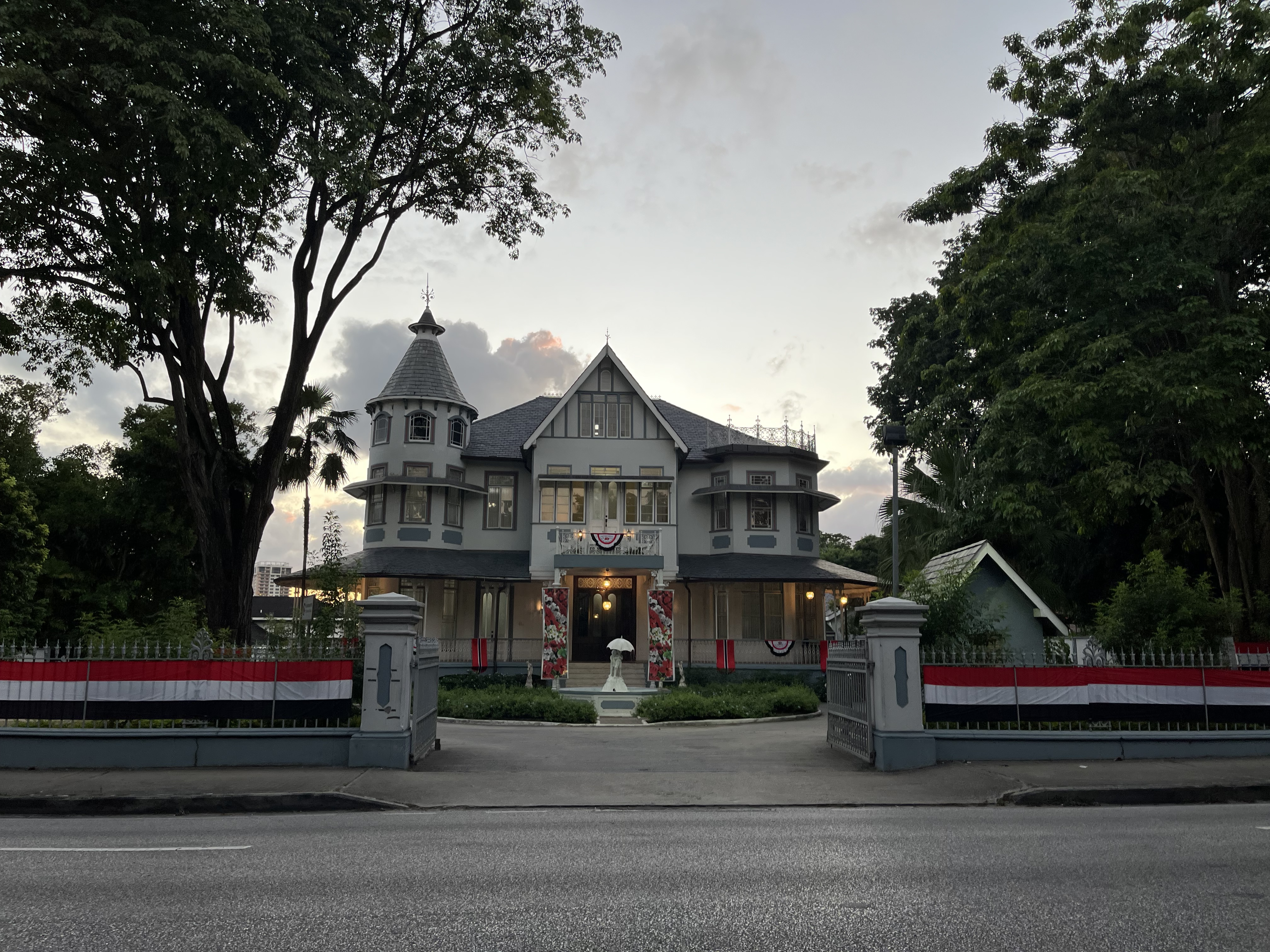
National Trust of Trinidad and Tobago

The National Trust of Trinidad and Tobago is managed by an eleven-member Council of different expertise and backgrounds. Five members are elected to the position, and six are ministerial appointments. Its offices are located in Port of Spain in Trinidad.

== History ==
The organization was established in 1991 under the National Trust Act to preserve and safeguard its natural and built heritage. The movement to create the National Trust was begun by members of the Citizens For Conservation (CFC), which includes engineers and architects.

== See also ==
- Indian Caribbean Museum of Trinidad and Tobago
- Magnificent Seven Houses, Port of Spain
