= Claude Vincent =

Royal Air Force officer and test pilot

- Born: 21 January 1896; Trinidad, British West Indies
- Died: 8 August 1967 (aged 71)
- Military career
- Allegiance: United Kingdom
- Branch: British Army (1915–17); Royal Air Force (1917–52)
- Service years: 1915–1952
- Rank: Air Vice Marshal
- Commands: Empire Central Flying School (1943–47); RAF Khormaksar (1940–42); Pilotless Aircraft Development Unit (1936–38)
- Conflicts: First World War; Third Anglo-Afghan War; Second World War
- Awards: Companion of the Order of the Bath; Commander of the Order of the British Empire; Distinguished Flying Cross & Bar; Air Force Cross; Mentioned in Despatches (2)

Air Vice Marshal Claude McClean Vincent, CB, CBE, DFC & Bar, AFC (21 January 1896 – 8 August 1967) was a Royal Air Force officer and test pilot.

== Early life ==
Vincent was born in Trinidad, British West Indies, the son of Harry Vincent and Clarissa McClean, and educated at Queen's Royal College.

== Military career ==
He served in the British Army during the First World War on the Macedonian front before transferring to the Royal Flying Corps. He was commissioned into the Royal Air Force on 11 August 1918. On 12 July 1920, he received the Distinguished Flying Cross while serving with No. 31 Squadron RAF in the Third Anglo-Afghan War. He received a Bar to his DFC in 1922. He was granted a permanent commission in 1924. Between 1924 and 1936, Vincent was involved in experimental flying and research at the Royal Aircraft Establishment, Farnborough, where he became one of the RAF's best-known test pilots. From 1930, he was a pioneer of wireless-controlled aircraft, and, after leaving Farnborough, he commanded the Pilotless Aircraft Development Unit from 1936 to 1938.

During the Second World War, he was posted to the Middle East and became Commanding Officer of RAF Khormaksar in 1940. In 1942 Vincent was mentioned in despatches. On 6 July 1943, he became Commandant of the Empire Central Flying School and on 15 March 1947 became Director of Flying Training in the RAF. On 13 June 1946, he was invested as a Companion of the Order of the Bath. On 15 July 1949, he was promoted to the rank of air vice-marshal and Vincent was made a Commander of the Order of the British Empire on 5 June 1952. He retired from the RAF on 29 August 1952.
