= Fabian Jackson =

Trinidadian bishop

Fabian Menteath Elliot Jackson (22 November 1902 – 16 July 1978) was an Anglican bishop in the mid-20th century.

== Early life and education ==
Born on 22 November 1902, he was educated at Westminster School and the University of London.

== Church career ==
Ordained in 1927, he was successively a curate at St Augustine's, Kilburn, Priest in charge at Northolt Park, and Vicar of All Saints, Clifton. His appointment to the episcopate as Bishop of Trinidad occurred in 1946. He brought with him from England Tony Tremlett to serve as his domestic chaplain and chief of staff. Tremlett held the post throughout Jackson's tenure, and remained in office in Trinidad until after Jackson's successor had been appointed. In 1950 Jackson resigned, and returned to England as an assistant bishop of Bath and Wells and Rector of Batcombe, Somerset, a post he held until retirement in 1967. He died on 16 July 1978.

Church of England titles
Preceded by Arthur Anstey	Bishop of Trinidad; 1946– 1949	Succeeded by Douglas Wilson
