= Stephen Cumberbatch =

Stephen Kenneth Cumberbatch (1909 – 2011) was a West Indian Anglican priest.

Cumberbatch was educated at Codrington College, Barbados and ordained in 1942. After a curacy at St. John's Cathedral, Antigua he was Priest in charge at St. Mary on the same island. He held Incumbencies at Stann Creek, St Patrick Tobago, Sangre Grande, Tacarigua, San Fernando and Port of Spain before his appointment as Archdeacon and Vicar General at the Diocese of Trinidad and Tobago in 1969. He served in this capacity until 1979. In 1994 he received the title of Archdeacon Emeritus.
