= St Boniface College, Warminster =

Coordinates: 51.208°N 2.189°W

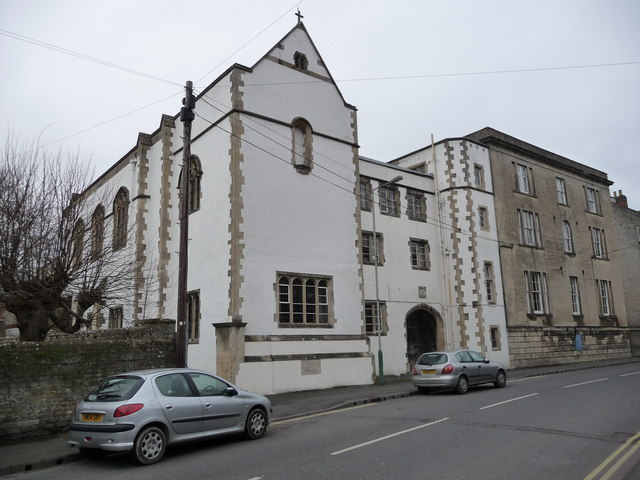
The former college in 2009

St Boniface College, Warminster, formerly St Boniface Missionary College, was an Anglican educational institution in the Wiltshire town of Warminster, England, during the last third of the 19th century and the first two-thirds of the 20th.

It was founded in 1860 by Sir James Erasmus Philipps, 12th Baronet, vicar of Warminster from 1859 to 1897, in a house on Church Road about 250m south of the parish church, St Denys'. At first it provided a place for young men without formal education to be trained for suitable employment but soon narrowed its scope to train them specifically for missionary work. It gradually grew in size and by 1897 the foundation stone was laid for a permanent college, this being completed in 1901.

Two former students of the college were martyred in China during the Boxer Rising: Harry Vine Norman and Charles Robinson, who were murdered in 1900. Another, Frederick Day of Stratton St Margaret near Swindon was murdered in North China on 4 March 1912.

The college closed during both the First and Second World Wars, and was a postgraduate facility for King's College, London, from 1948 until its eventual closure in 1969. The nearby Lord Weymouth's Grammar School then leased the buildings and today they form part of Warminster School.

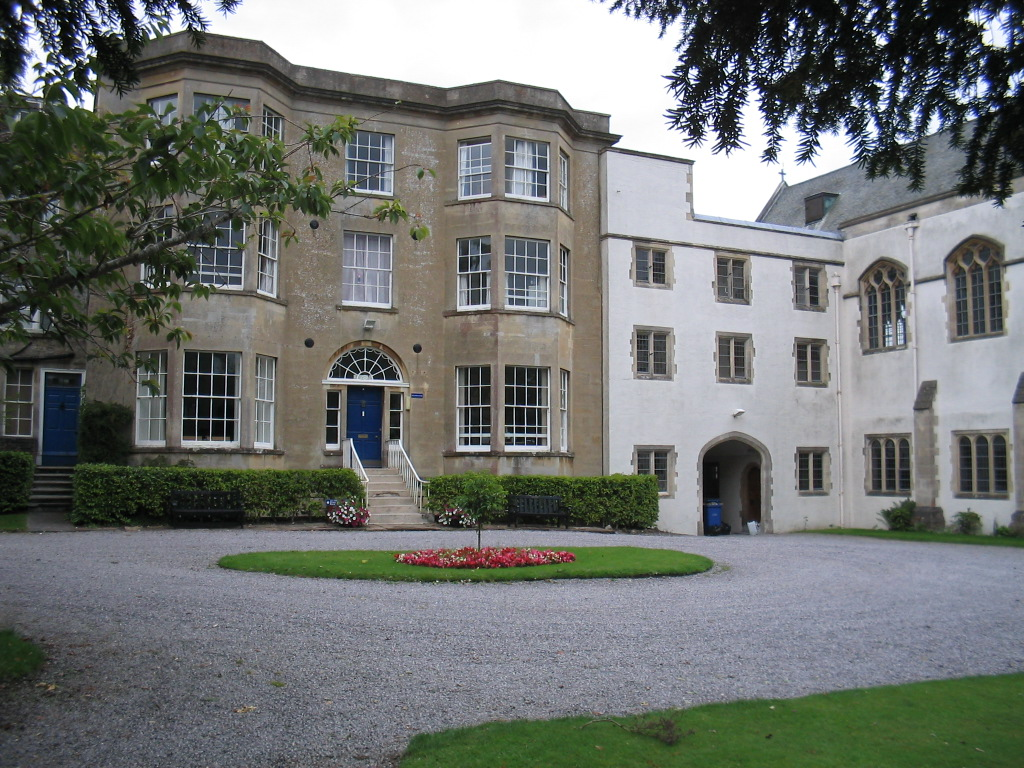
West front of the 1796 house

The buildings are in three phases, beginning in 1796 with the central three-storey structure, described by Nikolaus Pevsner as a "handsome house". To the right is the 1897–1901 extension, neo-Jacobean in dressed stone, decorated with ornate features such as gabled dormers bearing finials. In 1927 a further large L-shaped extension was built to the left, to designs of Sir Charles Nicholson. This part, which includes a chapel and library, is described by Historic England as "quite impressive Gothic".

== Notable people ==
Arthur Anstey, later Bishop of Trinidad and Tobago and Archbishop of the West Indies, was principal of the college from 1904.

Henry Ward Cunningham (1862–1943), clergyman and alumnus who presided over burial services at sea for victims of the Titanic disaster while aboard the recovery ship CS Minia.

== See also ==
- Category:Alumni of St Boniface Missionary College, Warminster
