= Thomas Hayes (bishop) =

James Thomas Hayes was Bishop of Trinidad and Tobago from 1889 until his death in 1904.

He was born in 1847 and educated at Ipswich grammar school and Trinity College, Cambridge. After graduation, he was ordained in 1871 and began his ecclesiastical career with a curacy at St John's, Chatham. From 1875 to 1889, he held incumbencies at Swineshead, Hinckley and Leicester.

He died on 26 January 1904. Hayes Court, the bishop's official residence in Port of Spain is named in his honour.

== Notes and references ==
Church of England titles
Preceded by Richard Rawle	Bishop of Trinidad; 1889–1904	Succeeded by John Welsh
