= Arthur Anstey =

Archbishop of the West Indies

Arthur Henry Anstey CBE (1873 – 13 November 1955) was Bishop of Trinidad and Tobago from 1918 until 1945; and for his last two years there Archbishop of the West Indies (primate of the Church in the Province of the West Indies).

Anstey was educated at Charterhouse School and Keble College, Oxford. After graduation, he was ordained in 1898 and began his ordained ministry with curacies at Aylesbury and Bedminster. From 1904 he was principal of St Boniface Missionary College, Warminster and after that (until his appointment to the episcopate) chaplain to Proctor Swaby, Bishop of Barbados.

There is a school named after Anstey in the Port of Spain.

Anglican Communion titles
Preceded by John Welsh	Bishop of Trinidad and Tobago; 1918–1945	Succeeded by Fabian Jackson
Preceded by Edward Dunn	Archbishop of the West Indies; 1943–1945	Succeeded by William Hardie
