= Good Shepherd Church Tunapuna =

Good Shepherd Anglican Church, Tunapuna
- Location within Trinidad and Tobago
- 10.646°N 61.387°W
- Location: Tunapuna
- Country: Trinidad and Tobago
- Denomination: Anglican

History
- Status: Parish church
- Founded: 1886
- Founder: Alfred Ramsden
- Dedication: Good Shepherd
- Consecrated: 30 November 1886

Architecture
- Heritage designation: Stage 2 – Identification & Inclusion of Heritage Site - National Trust of Trinidad and Tobago

Specifications
- Capacity: 350

Administration
- Province: Church in the Province of the West Indies
- Diocese: Anglican Diocese of Trinidad ad Tobago
- Parish: The Parish of The Good Shepherd and St. Oswald's Caroni

Clergy
- Priest: Kenely Baldeo

Good Shepherd Anglican Church, Tunapuna is an active Anglican church located at the corner of Freeling and Morton Street, Tunapuna. It is part of the Anglican Diocese of Trinidad ad Tobago. It is one of the oldest Anglican churches in Trinidad and Tobago having been built and consecrated in 1886. Architecturally, the outstanding feature of the Church is its towering steel belfry and bells which could be heard as far away as St Augustine. The Church building has been identified for inclusion on the list of national heritage sites by the National Trust of Trinidad and Tobago.
