= Francia Great House =

Historical plantation house in Saint George, Barbados

Coordinates: 13°8′39.49″N 59°33′55.77″W

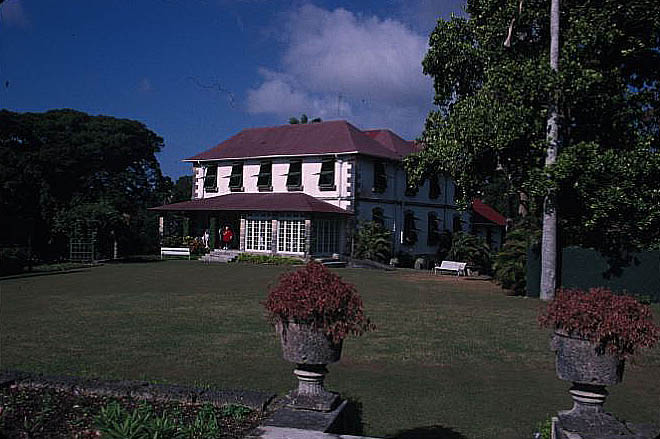
Francia Great House

Francia Great House is a historical plantation great house in Saint George, Barbados. It is on a wooded hillside near Gun Hill Signal Station.

== History ==
It was completed at the end of the 19th century or in the early 20th century (Note: It is also said to have been built at the turn of the 20th century, in 1910, 1912, or about 1913.) by a Frenchman, René Mourraille, who had lived in Brazil. He met and married a Barbadian and settled in Barbados. It was one of the last plantations built in Barbados. The plantation grew and exported yams, eddoes, and sweet potatoes. Sugar was not grown due to the reduction of the price of sugar internationally at the time the house was built. From the time the house was constructed, it was owned by descendants of Mourraille. By 2007, it had become a private school, the Providence Elementary School.

== Architecture and landscaping ==
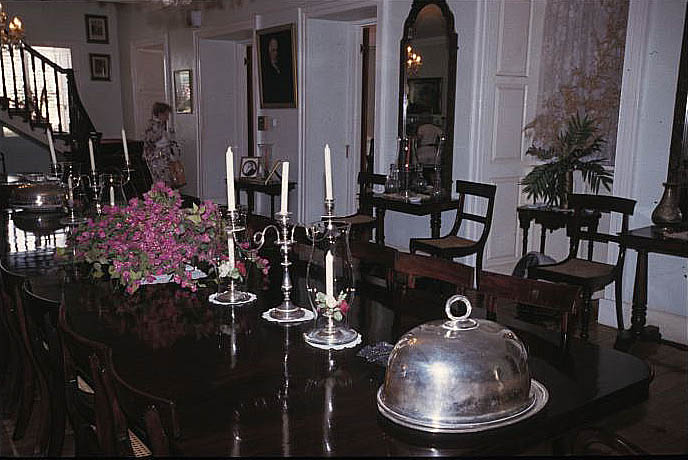
Dining room

The building reflects the owner's interest in French architecture in the triple-arched entrance, enclosed upper balcony, and "sweeping front staircase". The house combines Barbadian coral stone craftsmanship, Demerara windows, and Brazilian wood panelling. It has a collection of antique mahogany furniture and West Indian maps dating back to the early 16th century. It is set in terraced English-style gardens, with bougainvillea, hibiscus, and frangipani plants and a large mammee apple tree. It also has orchards. The Barbados National Trust designated it a house of architectural interest.
