= Sehon Goodridge Theological Society =

The Sehon Goodridge Theological Society is an ecumenical Christian and education organization established in 2008. The Society is headquartered in Trinidad and Tobago and is named in honor of the late Sehon Goodridge former Anglican Archbishop of the Windward Islands.

== History ==
The Society initially began as the Trinidad and Tobago branch of the Codrington College Diploma of Theological Studies Program. This external diploma, which was an initiative of Goodridge and was designed primarily for lay persons in leadership positions of Christian Churches and had been carried on in Trinidad since the mid-seventies After Goodridge's death in 2007 members of the Diploma in Theology programme obtained permission from his widow, Janet, to set up The Sehon Goodridge Theological Society as an Interdenominational organization to promote theological research and study and Interfaith dialogue.

== Activities ==
The main activities of the society include

- The Diploma in Theological Studies (offered in Conjunction with Codrington College)
- An Annual Service for Justice and Peace an annual interfaith service includes the clergy and laity of different faiths
- The annual Sehon Goodridge Commemorative Lecture. A public lecture to commemorate the theological legacy of Sehon Goodridge. The lecture has been delivered by a number of prominent Caribbean Theologians including:
  - Reverend Dr. Marcus Lashley, Anglican Minister and Psychologist - 2012
  - Clyde Martin Harvey - Roman Catholic Bishop of Grenada - 2016
  - Rev. Michael Clark, Principal of Codrington College - 2015
- Publication of an online journal called The Journal of Caribbean Christian Action
- Retreats, quiet days and discussion series

== Notable members ==
- Knolly Clarke - Chairman and Academic Dean - Retired Dean, Holy Trinity Cathedral, Port of Spain
- Paula Henry - Chair of HaiT&T Foundation
