= Claude Berkley =

Trinidadian bishop

Claude Berkley has been Bishop of Trinidad and Tobago since 2011.

Berkley was educated at Pembroke Anglican School, Tobago; Bishop's High School, Tobago; Valsayn Teachers College, Port of Spain, Codrington College and the University of Birmingham. He was ordained in 1992. His first Priest in charge at St Mary, Tobago. In 2002 he was transferred to All Saints Parish, Trinidad. In October 2010 he was elected as Coadjutor Bishop in the Diocese of Trinidad and Tobago in 2010.

Anglican Communion titles
Preceded by Calvin Bess	Bishop of Trinidad; 2011–	Succeeded by Incumbent
