= John Welsh (bishop) =

John Francis Welsh (1856–1916) was Bishop of Trinidad and Tobago from 1904 until his death in 1916.

He was born in Huddersfield in 1856 and educated at Christ Church, Oxford. After graduation, he was ordained in 1882 and began his ecclesiastical career with a curacy at St James, Whitehaven. From 1883 until 1886 he was a Lecturer at St Bees’ Theological College and from then (until his appointment to the episcopate) Principal of Warminster Missionary College. He became a Doctor of Divinity (DD).

Church of England titles
Preceded by Thomas Hayes	Bishop of Trinidad; 1904–1916	Succeeded by Arthur Anstey
