= Airflow window =

Ventilated double glazing

An airflow window is composed of at least two panes of glass and a cavity between them that allows the flow of ventilation air. They operate on similar principles to a double-skin facade, but on a smaller scale. The general idea is to improve the energy efficiency of a cavity window by heating or cooling the cavity with ventilation air.

== Benefit ==
In warm climates the window is used for exhausting ventilation air. Cooler air enters the cavity at the bottom, from the interior space, is heated during transfer upwards through the cavity and is exhausted at the top of the cavity to the exterior.

In cold climates the window is used for intake of ventilation air. Cold air enters the bottom of the cavity, from the outside, is heated during transfer upwards though the cavity, and enters the interior space at the top of the cavity. More complex designs exist, which for example do not transfer ventilated air between the interior and exterior, or which have multiple ventilation channels.

The movement of air through the cavity can be forced (by means of mechanical devices such as fans), or occur freely, by means of convection. Whether the air flow is free or forced can affect energy efficiency of the window.

== See also ==
- Bow window
