= Richard Sampson (cricketer) =

English cricketer

Personal information
- Full name: Richard King Sampson
- Born: 15 May 1860; Lewes, Sussex, England
- Died: 12 July 1927 (aged 67); Ringmer, Sussex, England
- Batting: Right-handed
- Role: Occasional wicket-keeper

Domestic team information
- Years: Team
- 1886: Sussex

Career statistics
Competition	First-class
Matches	1
Runs scored	7
Batting average	3.50
100s/50s	–/–
Top score	5
Balls bowled	–
Wickets	–
Bowling average	–
5 wickets in innings	–
10 wickets in match	–
Best bowling	–
Catches/stumpings	1/–
- Source: Cricinfo, 16 December 2011

Richard King Sampson (15 May 1860 – 12 July 1927) was an English cricketer. Sampson was a right-handed batsman who occasionally fielded as a wicket-keeper. He was born at Lewes, Sussex.

Sampson made a single first-class appearance for Sussex against Nottinghamshire at Trent Bridge in 1886. He was dismissed for 2 runs in Sussex's first-innings by Wilfred Flowers, while in their second-innings he scored 5 runs before becoming one of William Attewell's 9 wickets. Nottinghamshire won by an innings and 15 runs. This was his only major appearance for Sussex.

He died at Ringmer, Sussex on 12 July 1927.
