= Colin Sampson (priest) =

Richard Ian Colin Sampson (born 1955) is an Anglican priest. He is a former dean of Trinidad.

He was educated at Codrington College, Barbados and ordained in 1980. He began his career as a Curate at the cathedral of which he became dean. After that he held incumbencies in Point Fortin, Chaguanas and South Caicos. Following these he was Chaplain to the Mission to Seafarers in Trinidad. Lastly, before his appointment as dean in 2004, he was rector of St. Patrick's, Tobago.
