= Rawle Douglin =

Anglican bishop (1933–2023)

Rawle Ernest Douglin (17 January 1933 – 6 April 2023) was a Bishop of Trinidad and Tobago.

Educated at Kelham Theological College, he was ordained in 1960 and began his ecclesiastical career with a curacy at All Saints Port of Spain. After this he served incumbencies at St. Stephen's, Princes Town The Good Shepherd, Tunapuna and All Saints’ Church, Newtown. Later he was Dean of Holy Trinity Cathedral in Port of Spain before his elevation to the episcopate in 1992, serving for ten years.

Douglin died on 6 April 2023, at the age of 90.

== Notes and references ==
Anglican Communion titles
Preceded by Clive Orminston Abdulah	Bishop of Trinidad; 1991–2001	Succeeded by Calvin Wendell Bess
