= Holy Trinity Cathedral, Port of Spain =

Coordinates: 10°39′08.4″N 61°30′37.3″W

Holy Trinity Cathedral
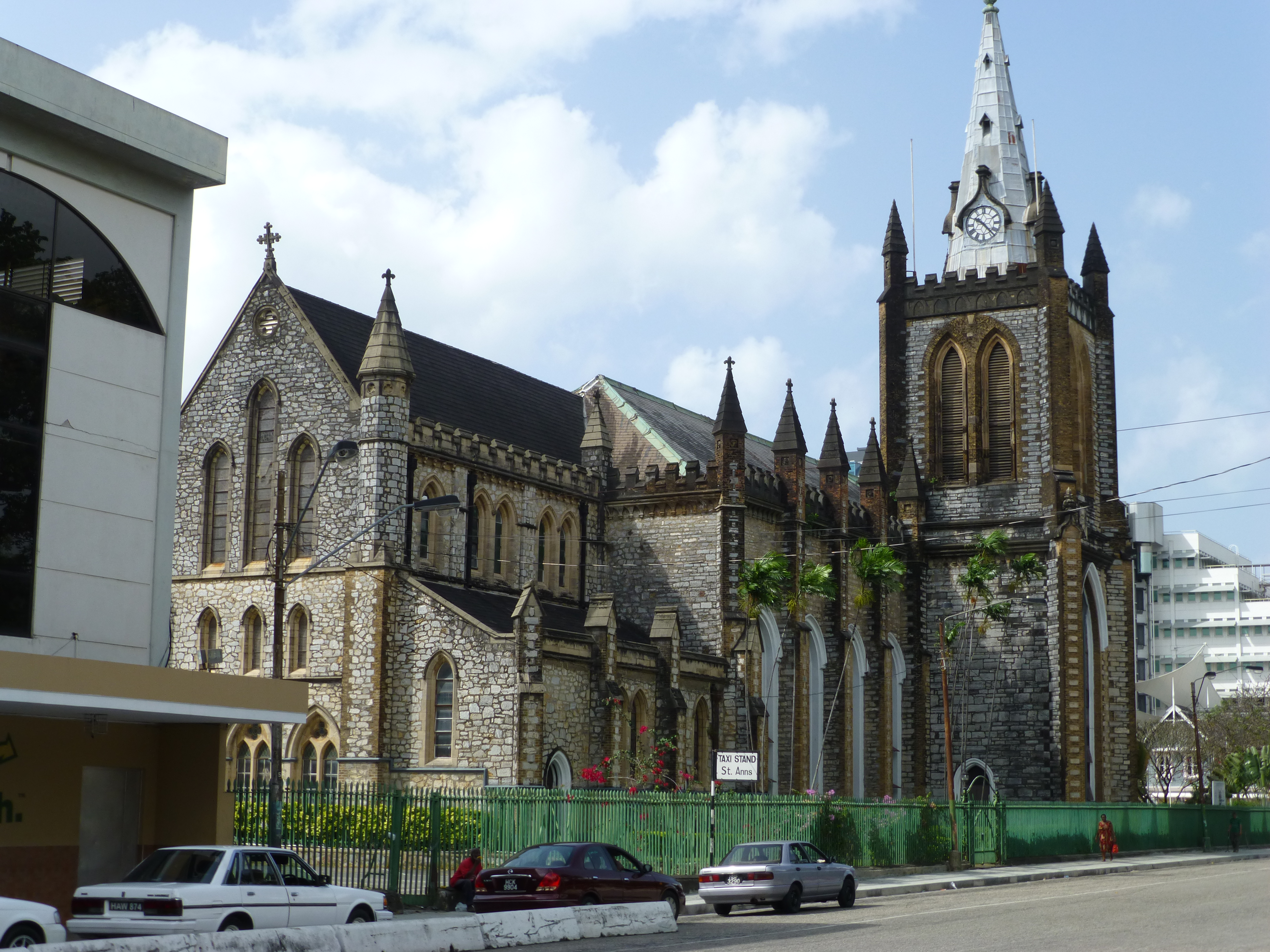
- Holy Trinity Cathedral
- Country: Trinidad and Tobago
- Denomination: Anglican Communion
- Website: htctt.org

History
- Status: Closed for restoration
- Consecrated: May 25th, 1823

Architecture
- Architect: Philip Reinagle
- Style: Mainly Gothic Revival architecture
- Years built: 1816-1823

Administration
- Province: Church in the Province of the West Indies
- Diocese: Diocese of Trinidad and Tobago

Clergy
- Bishop: Claude Berkley
- Dean: Dr. Shelley-Ann Tenia

Holy Trinity Cathedral is an Anglican Cathedral in Port of Spain, the capital of Trinidad and Tobago.

Constructed between 1816-1823, it is the principal Anglican cathedral in the country and serves as the seat of the Bishop of the Diocese of Trinidad and Tobago.

== History ==
The original Holy Trinity Church was a wooden building which stood on the corner of Prince Street and Frederick Street, but was destroyed in the Great Fire of 1808.

By 1815, arrangements were made under the then Governor Sir Ralph Woodford to build the church at its present site, 30A Abercromby Street, after alternative plans to rebuild on what is today Woodford Square were rejected. The corner stone of the church was laid in 1816 and the construction was completed in 1823. It was consecrated on Trinity Sunday in May 25th, 1823.

In 1872, the Anglican Church in Trinidad became a diocese, and the Trinity Church was elevated to Trinity Cathedral.

The cathedral was badly damaged in the earthquake of August 2018, particularly the walls, the steeple, and chancel roof, as well as several stone pinnacles. The government of Trinidad and Tobago provided $20 million TTD towards the restoration of the building against an expected total cost of $80 million TTD. The cathedral remains closed until restoration and repairs can be completed.

== Architecture ==
The design, which has a strong neo-Gothic element, is credited to Philip Reinagle (son of the painter of the same name). It incorporates lancet windows, pinnacled buttresses, a steeply pitched roof and an overall emphasis on height. The construction materials include blue limestone, from the Laventille quarries and yellow brick, the latter transported from England.

== Interior ==
The cathedral features a hammerbeam roof.

The organ was constructed by J. W. Walker & Sons Ltd, a British firm.

== Gallery ==
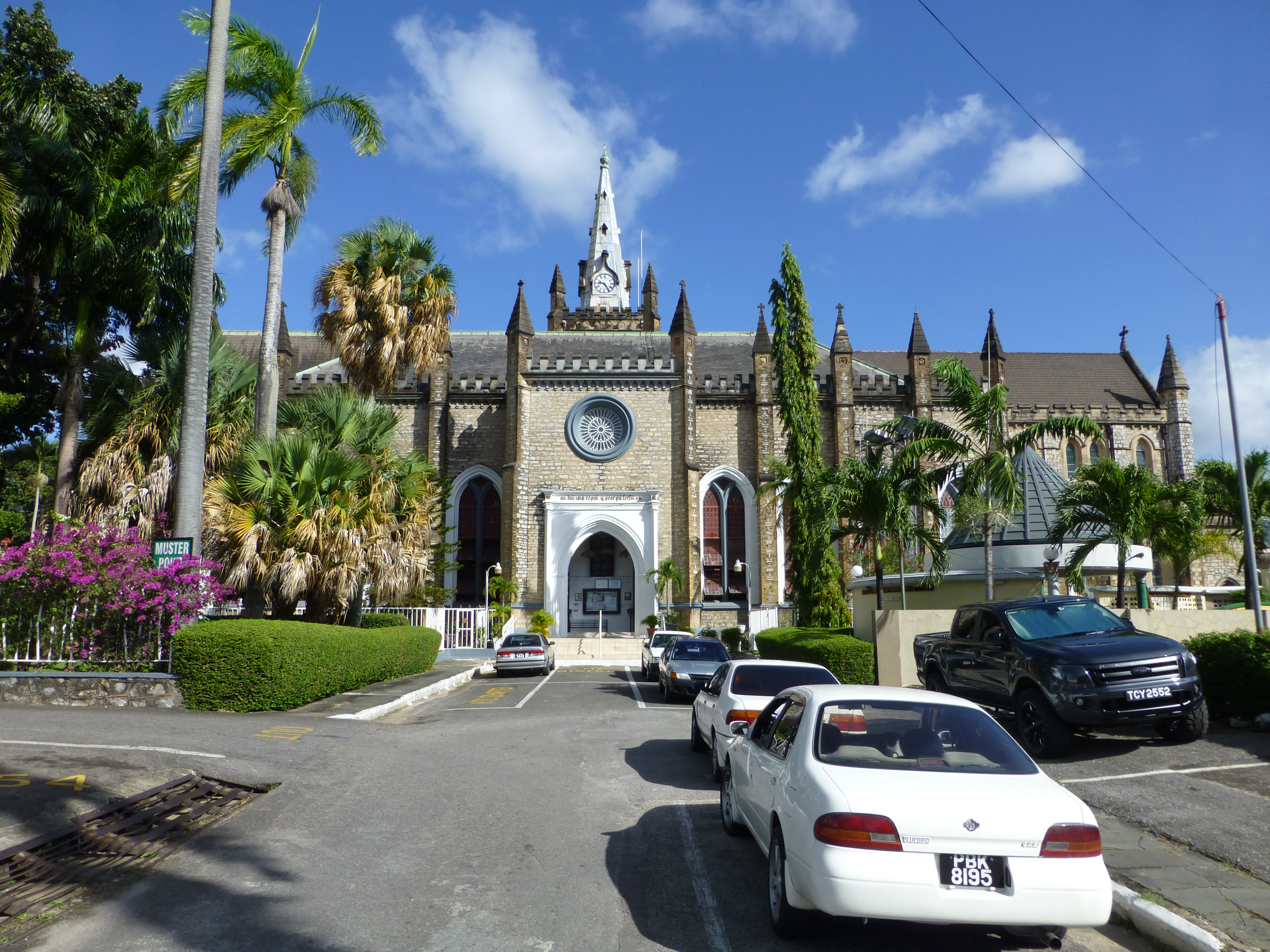
Front view

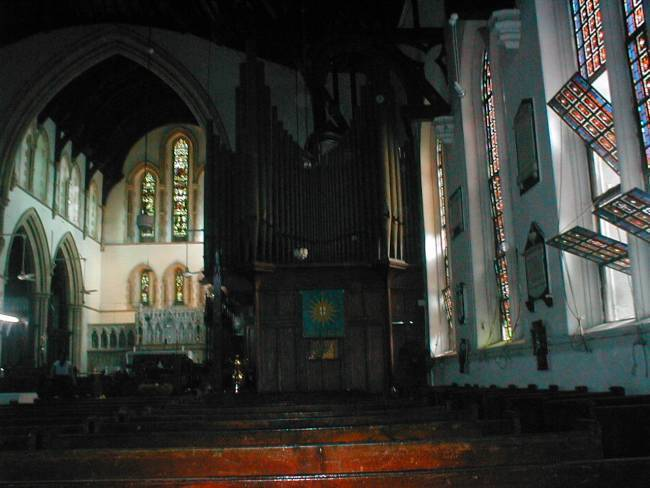

== Administration ==
From 1824 until 1872 Trinidad was administered by the Bishop of Barbados. The Anglican Diocese of Trinidad and Tobago was set up in 1872. In 1908, an anonymous gift of a site in Port of Spain enabled construction to begin on Hayes Court, a house for the bishop.

The current dean and rector is the Very Reverend Dr. Shelley-Ann Tenia. She previously served as a rector in Curepe.
