= Diocese of Trinidad and Tobago =

Coat of arms of the diocese.

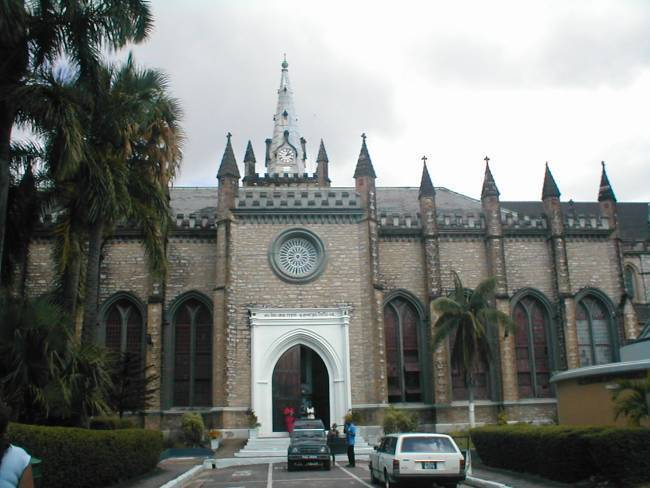
Holy Trinity Cathedral, Port of Spain

The Anglican Diocese of Trinidad and Tobago is the administrative structure grouping together Anglicans in the nation of Trinidad and Tobago under a bishop. It is one of eight dioceses of the Church in the Province of the West Indies.

As of 2009, it included 30 parishes, and was responsible for 59 primary schools, one special school, and nine high schools. The cathedral church is Holy Trinity Cathedral, Port of Spain.

The current bishop of Trinidad and Tobago is Claude Berkley.

== History ==
The diocese was set up in 1872. Originally, the area was nominally under the charge of the Bishop of London, a situation that had been assumed to hold from 1660 onwards. In 1813, the then Bishop of London denied it was his responsibility, and so it turned out that clergy appointments to the Church in the Colonies were recommended by the local governor, in this case the Governor of the Leeward Islands. From 1824 until 1872 the area was administered by the Bishop of Barbados. The coat of arms of the diocese was granted by the College of Arms in London in 1951, and includes the Alpha and Omega and a version of the Shield of the Trinity.

== Bishops ==
- 1872–1889: Richard Rawle
- 1889–1904: Thomas Hayes
- 1904–1916: John Welsh
- 1918–1945: Arthur Anstey (also Archbishop of the West Indies, 1943–45)
- 1946–1949: Fabian Jackson
- 1951–1956: Douglas Wilson
- 1957–1961: Noel Chamberlain
- 1962–1970: James Hughes
  - 1967–1972: Guy Marshall, suffragan for Venezuela (became Bishop in Venezuela, 1972–1974)
- 1970–1993: Clive Abdulah
- 1993–2001: Rawle Douglin
- 2001–2011: Calvin Bess
- 2011–present: Claude Berkley

== See also ==
- Religion in Trinidad and Tobago
