= St. John's Episcopal Church (Christiansted, U.S. Virgin Islands) =

- U.S. National Register of Historic Places
- U.S. Historic district – Contributing property
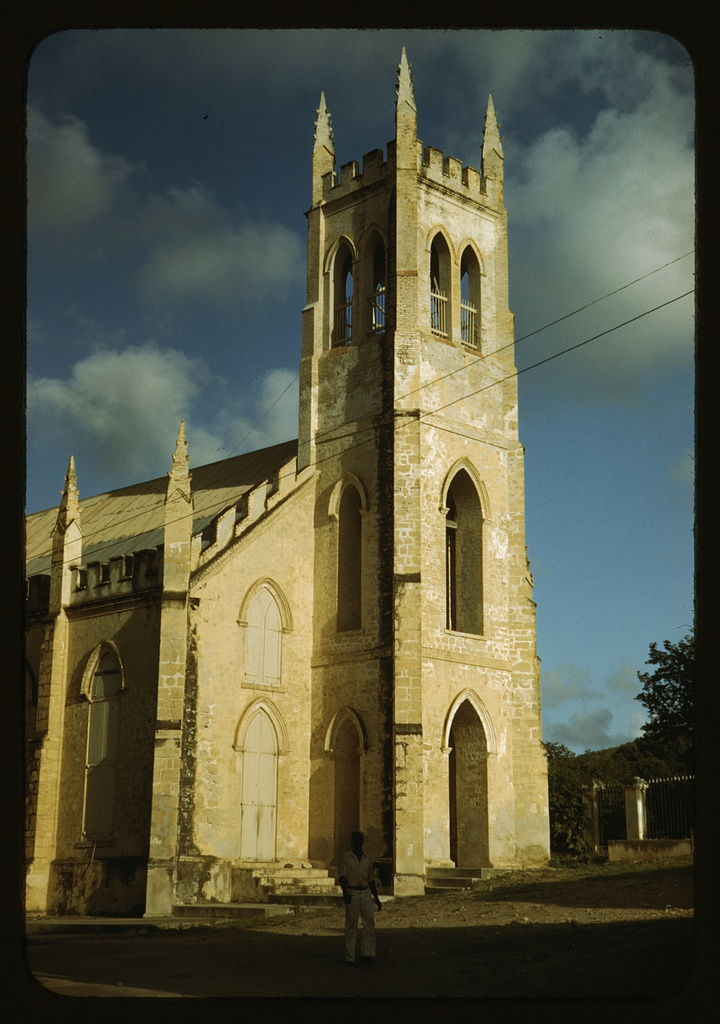

- Location within Saint Croix, U.S. Virgin Islands Location within the U.S. Virgin Islands
- Location: Plot #27 King Street, Christiansted, Virgin Islands
- Coordinates: 17°44′34″N 64°42′28″W
- Built: 1868
- Architectural style: Gothic Revival
- Part of: Christiansted Historic District (ID76002266)
- NRHP reference No.: 16000698

Significant dates
- Added to NRHP: October 4, 2016
- Designated CP: July 30, 1976

St. John's Episcopal Church, historically known as St. John's Anglican Church, is a church in Christiansted, Virgin Islands. Although most of the current building dates to 1868, a church has been located on the site since the 18th century. It and its adjacent graveyard were listed on the National Register of Historic Places in 2016. It is located within the Christiansted Historic District, to which it is also a contributing property.

Restoration efforts were continuing in 2017.

== History ==
=== Establishment and early history ===
The land that would become St. John's Anglican Church was purchased in 1752 by the Church of England, who wanted to establish a presence on Saint Croix. Although the island was then part of the Danish West Indies, there was a large, growing population of English, Irish, and Scots inhabitants. This was the first permanent parish successfully established by the Church of England on Saint Croix; for this reason, it has been nicknamed the "Mother Church of the Diocese". The Society for the Propagation of the Gospel in Foreign Parts funded the church in its first years; the group felt that Christianity in colonial areas was neglected and that morals of citizens there were too relaxed. The parish was established in Christiansted in 1760 when the Reverend Cecil Wray Goodchild traveled from Teddington, England, to become Rector of the Parish. With Goodchild's arrival, the church was placed under the jurisdiction of the Bishop of London. This original church was a simple cross-shaped wooden structure placed upon a brick foundation. Goodchild stayed in this role until his retirement in 1785; he and his wife are buried in the churchyard.

Between 1765 and 1773, United States Founding Father Alexander Hamilton and his family attended worship services here intermittently, as their residence was located nearby. Hamilton also attended the church's school. The 1768 death of Hamilton's mother, Rachel Faucette, was recorded in St. John's burial registry; however, she was buried alongside relatives on Tuite's Grange Plantation, located outside of Christiansted. St. John's has been damaged or destroyed several times since its initial construction. The first of these was on August 31, 1772, when a hurricane destroyed the wooden church structure entirely. Hamilton would later publish a recount of the hurricane's devastation in the Royal Danish American Gazette; it was this account that gained him enough recognition to enable him to enter high society and fund his education in the United States. The new church was crafted from sturdier Bermudan sandstone and was completed in 1779; this larger building could now seat 500 worshippers. Records exist of the establishment of a "poor-school" prior to 1796 and a poorhouse in 1810.

The African diaspora made up a large part of St. John's congregation, and Black residents―both free and enslaved―worshipped alongside white residents. However, worship services were segregated; Black worshippers had an allocated spot apart from their white counterparts and were unable to sit in the pews. In 1794, free Black parishioners petitioned the church to be able to rent pews; this was approved by the vestry in 1797. Their allocated section was in "the North part of the gallery and the double pew under the same". However, their presence caused contention and pushback from white parishioners, and in 1810 the decision was reversed, barring Black worshippers from occupying any pew. They were also disallowed from providing their own chairs; only a section of moveable chairs in the middle aisle was made available. The gallery was reallocated to be used by the military garrisons present on the island. Still, Black Crucians continued to worship and gather here. Until the abolition of slavery in 1848, separate burial, marriage, and baptism registers were kept for enslaved and free worshippers. An account from the 1830s notes that Black attendees now had an allocated spot to worship but were still made to enter the church through a separate entrance from their white counterparts. By the 1910s, however, no such segregation inside the church existed.

In 1824, the church was transferred from the Bishop of London to the Bishop of Barbados; and in 1842, it was transferred again to the new Bishop of Antigua. The abolition of slavery in 1848 introduced a wave of new parishioners, and renovations were soon underway to expand the church. The expansion was carried out over a period of about 10 years and heavily altered the exterior of the church in the English Gothic Revival architectural style, influenced by the Oxford Movement that was gaining traction across England's sphere of influence. A Sunday school building located on the grounds nearby was one of the first new structures to be added during this period; this building survives today. Stained-glass windows were imported from New York City and installed on Palm Sunday 1854. A bell tower was also added to the church's west façade in 1858; it housed a bell weighing 2,566 lb (1,164 kg) that was inscribed with "Meneelys West Troy, N.Y. / Presented to St. John's Church, Santa Cruz, W.I. / by Charles Lucas Esq. Planter, A.D. 1857. /Rev.Fletcher J. Hawley/ Rector.". Both the bell and the stained-glass windows are the largest of their kind anywhere in the Virgin Islands. On October 29, 1854, the church was consecrated by Rev. Daniel Gateward Davis, then Bishop of Antigua. Over this period of reconstruction, the church flourished and membership jumped from 300 to 1500 worshippers; and by this time, the majority of attendees were Black Crucians.

=== 1866 fire and reconstruction ===
The reconstruction, however, was short-lived. On February 5, 1866, a fire—now called the Sunday Market Fire—caused by a burst lamp in a rum store on Market Street swept through Saint Croix. The church and schoolhouse were entirely destroyed; only the walls survived. Repairs were quickly underway and were completed by 1868. In the meantime, the congregation met at other local churches that had been spared during the fire. The new church was constructed of limestone and brick and followed the architectural style of its most recent incarnation. The church bell, also damaged, had to be recast in 1867. The stained-glass windows are believed to be exact duplicates from the same company in New York. The new pews were made of polished mahogany and the roof had supports made of Southern pine. From the period following the restoration and fire, St. John's struggled financially, and local leadership was critical of the church's neglect of the Caribbean. Financial depressions in the late 1800s and the 1930s did not spare Saint Croix, let alone the church; neither did tense local race relations and the 1878 St. Croix labor riot. Although the church was physically unscathed, it continued to accumulate debt. Poverty increased and St. John's was afforded little in way of relief. Additionally, emigration en masse to the United States caused Saint Croix's population to dwindle from 32,000 in 1803 to just 14,700 by 1917; so too did the congregation's membership suffer. In 1917, membership was about 2,000 worshippers.

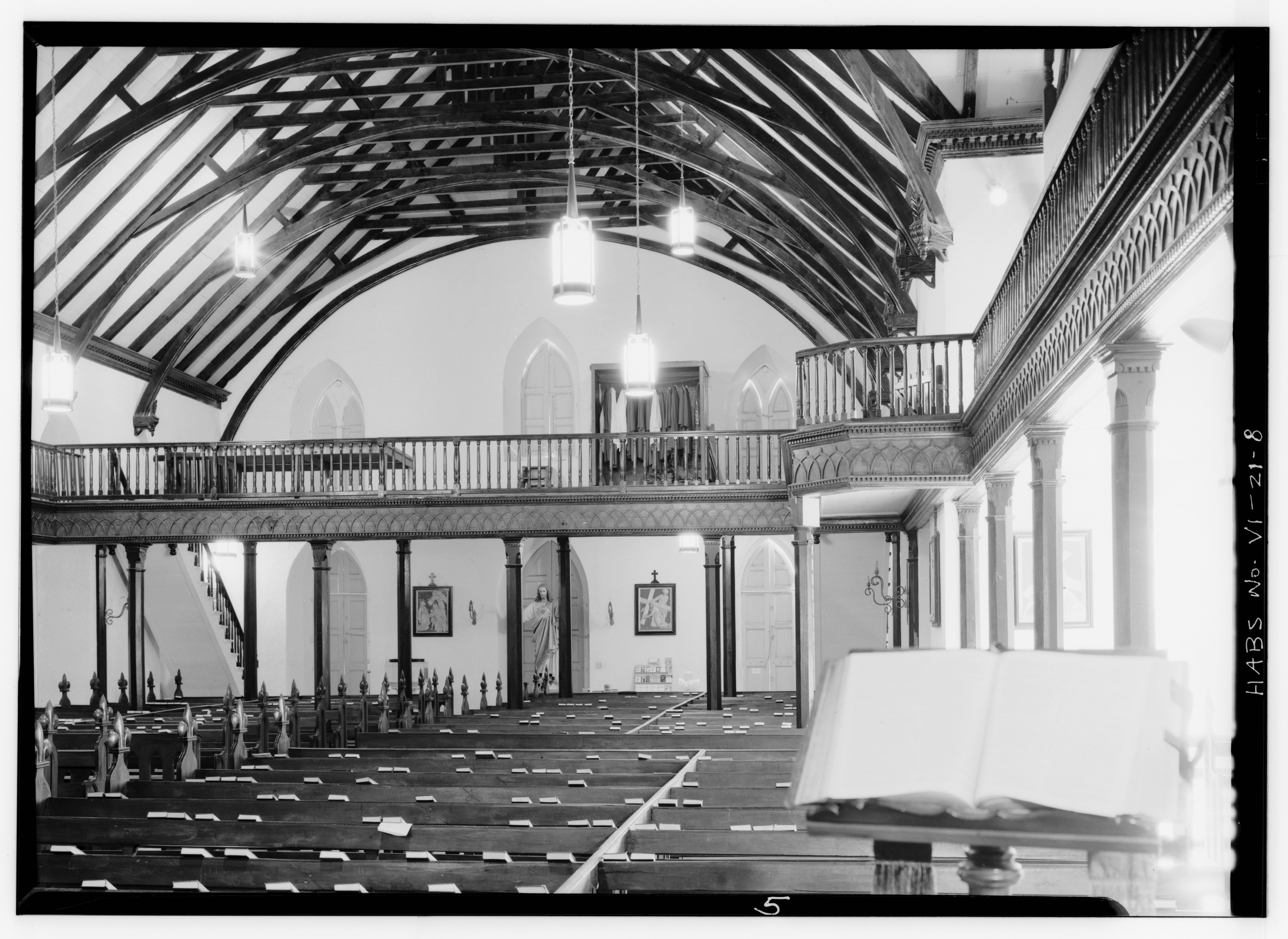
Interior of St. John's, displaying the nave and facing the south wall, mid-20th century

The sale of the Danish West Indies to the United States in 1917 brought with it a host of cultural and jurisdictional changes to the parish. In 1919, the jurisdiction of St. John's was transferred from the Church of England to the Domestic and Foreign Mission Society of the Protestant Episcopal Church—at which time the church was renamed to St. John's Episcopal Church. It was at this time placed in the care of the Bishop of the Missionary Diocese of Puerto Rico; this became the Missionary Diocese of the Virgin Islands in 1963. Still, St. John's continued to suffer from low financial support and declining membership; by 1940, 700 members remained, less than half of what it had been 20 years prior. These hardships did not let up until the 1960s, when new government mandates restructured the Virgin Islands' economy. A major shift from sugar cane production to industry and tourism occurred.

On October 4, 2016, St. John's Episcopal Church was listed on the National Register of Historic Places for its rich multicultural heritage, architectural significance, and its association with Alexander Hamilton.

== Graveyard and burials ==
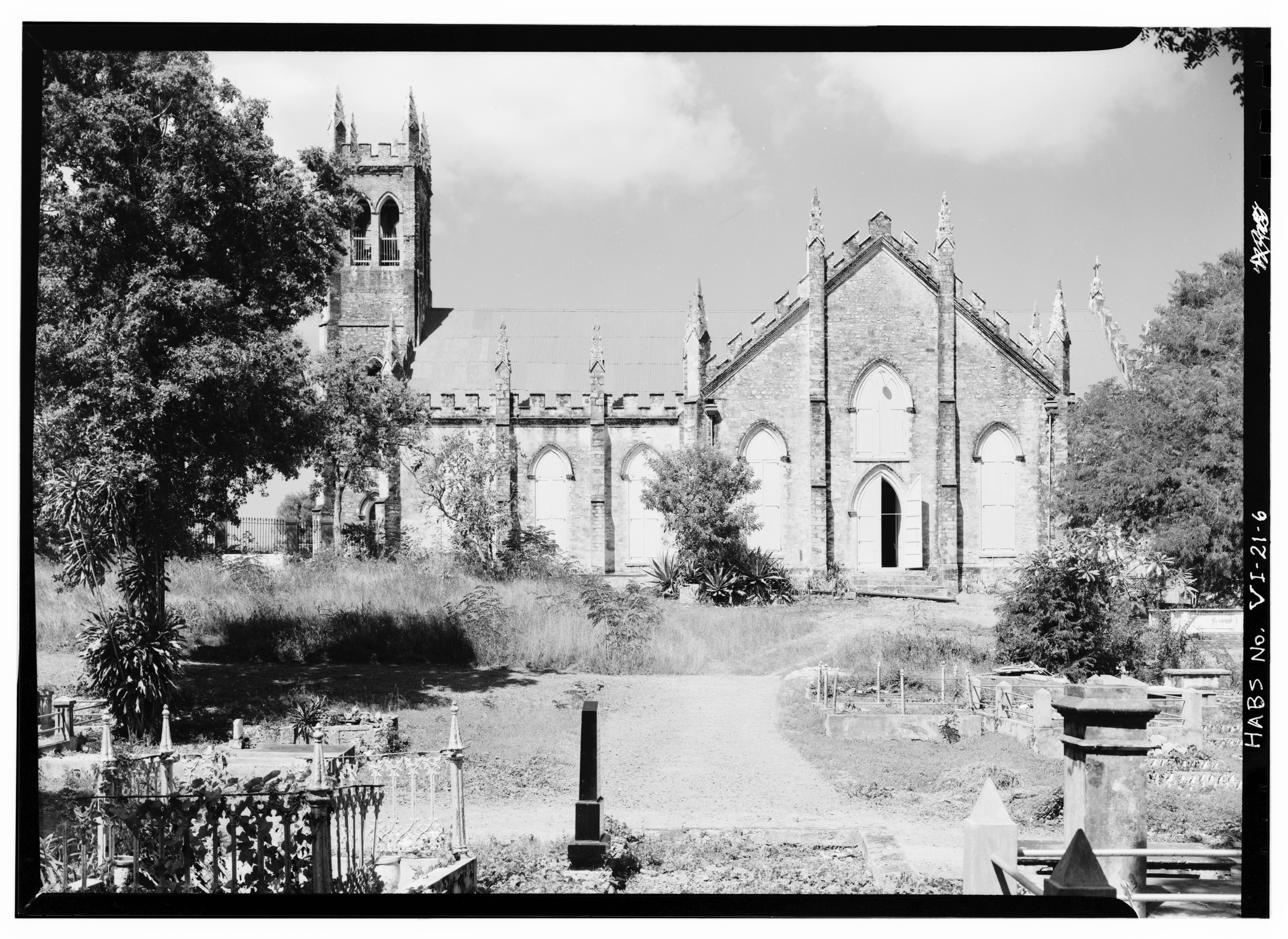
St. John's Episcopal Church with its graveyard in the foreground

The earliest known burial in the graveyard adjacent to the church was in 1760. However, when the church was expanded in the early 1800s, the old gravestones were moved to the church's nave; the burials were not moved and still lie under the current-day transepts. Gravestones of parishioners who had no living relatives to claim them were also moved. Many of the relocated gravestones, particularly those of significant parishioners, have been set into the floor of the church. The remains of a previous reverend, Rev. William Josephus Bulkley, were interred under the altar upon his death in 1830; he is the only known person to have been intentionally buried inside the church.
