= Cottle (surname) =

Cottle is a surname. According to Cottle, this surname is a Cornish toponym referring to a 'wood (by the) estuary' with some association with the River Tamar in Cornwall.

Notable people sharing this surname include:

- Amos Simon Cottle (1766–1800), British poet
- Annette Cottle (living), American volleyball player and coach
- Barry Cottle (living), American businessman, CEO of Scientific Games Corporation
- Basil Cottle (1917–1994), British grammarian, historian and archaeologist
- Brian Cottle (living), lawyer and judge from Saint Vincent and the Grenadines
- Christopher Cottle (living), American lawyer and jurist
- Darby Cottle (living), American softball player
- Dave Cottle (living), American lacrosse coach
- Frank Cottle (1920–1992), Australian rugby league footballer
- George Washington Cottle (1811–1836), Republic of Texas soldier
- Gerry Cottle (1945–2021), circus owner
- Gitta Cottle, alternative name for Gertrude Weinstock (1904–1985), American pianist
- Joe Cottle, (1886–1958), English footballer
- John Cottle (living), New Zealand equestrian
- Joseph Cottle (1770–1853), English publisher and author
- Josephine Owaissa Cottle, alternative name for Gale Storm (1922–2009), American actress, singer
- Laurence Cottle (living), British composer and musician
- Marjorie Cottle (1900–1987), British motorcycle racer
- Matthew Cottle (living), British actor
- Nancy Cottle, listed as chairperson for Arizona on false slate of Trump electors
- Richard W. Cottle (living), American mathematician
- Robert Cottle (1920–1999) was an American television host
- Sibella Cottle (deceased), mistress to Irish noble
- Sidney Cottle (1892–1967), British flying ace
- Simeon Cottle (born 2004), American basketball player
- Simon Cottle (rower) (living), British rower
- Steven Cottle (living), New Zealand rower
- Tameka Cottle (living), American singer-songwriter
- Thomas Cottle (1761–1828), lawyer

Fictional characters:

- Sherman Cottle
