= Ernest Flemming =

Nevisian Anglican bishop

The Right Reverend Ernest Flemming
- Bishop of the Diocese of the North East Caribbean and Aruba
- Church: Church in the Province of the West Indies
- Diocese: North East Caribbean and Aruba
- Installed: 6 May 2022
- Predecessor: Errol Brooks

Orders
- Ordination: 1985 (Deacon), 2010 (Canon), 2022 (Bishop)

Personal details
- Denomination: Anglicanism
- Profession: Bishop
- Education: Codrington College; University of the West Indies

Ernest Alroy Flemming is a Nevisian Anglican Bishop who is the Bishop of the Diocese of the North East Caribbean and Aruba.

== Career ==
Flemming is from Barnes Ghaut, Nevis. He studied theology at the University of the West Indies and was trained at Codrington College. He became a Deacon in 1985.

In 2010, Flemming was made a Canon of the Cathedral Church of St. John the Divine, Antigua. Prior to his appointment as a Bishop in 2022, Flemming was the Dean of the cathedral.

On 14 January 2022, Flemming was elected as the Bishop-elect of the Diocese of the North East Caribbean and Aruba. He was later consecrated and ordained on 4 May 2022, and enthroned on 6 May 2022, becoming the 13th Bishop of the diocese and succeeding Errol Brooks.

== Personal life ==
Flemming is married and has two children.
