= Joan Hunter Dunn =

Muse of John Betjeman (1915–2008)

Joan Jackson, née Joan Hunter Dunn (13 October 1915 – 11 April 2008) was the muse of Sir John Betjeman in his poem "A Subaltern's Love-song".

== Biography ==
=== Early life ===
She was the daughter of Dr George Hunter Dunn, a GP from Farnborough, Hampshire. Her grandfather, Andrew Hunter Dunn, was Bishop of Quebec from 1892 to 1914, and her uncle, Edward Dunn, was Bishop of British Honduras and Archbishop of the West Indies. A great-great-grandfather was William Hunter, Lord Mayor of London in 1851-52 (the grandfather of both of her father's parents). Her mother, Mabel Liddelow, died in 1916.

=== Education ===
Joan was educated from the age of six at Queen Anne's School, Caversham, near Reading, Berkshire, where she played tennis, became captain of the lacrosse team, and was head girl.

She studied for a diploma at King's College of Household and Social Science, and joined the catering department at the University of London.

=== Becoming a muse ===
Betjeman saw her for the first time in December 1940. He was working for the Films Division of the Ministry of Information, based in the Senate House of the University of London, where she worked in the canteen. Although married for seven years, he was struck by her beauty, he fell in love, and composed a 44-line poem fantasising about them being engaged and playing tennis together in Aldershot:

Miss J. Hunter Dunn, Miss J. Hunter Dunn,
Furnish'd and burnish'd by Aldershot sun,
What strenuous singles we played after tea,
We in the tournament - you against me!

Love-thirty, love-forty, oh! weakness of joy,
The speed of a swallow, the grace of a boy,
With carefullest carelessness, gaily you won,
I am weak from your loveliness, Joan Hunter Dunn.
[...]
We sat in the car park till twenty to one
And now I'm engaged to Miss Joan Hunter Dunn.

The poem was published in Cyril Connolly's Horizon magazine in February 1941. Betjeman invited Hunter Dunn to lunch, and presented her with a copy of the magazine containing the poem, begging her forgiveness. In an interview in The Sunday Times magazine in 1965, illustrated with photographs by Lord Snowdon, she said: "It was such a marvellous break from the monotony of the war. It really was remarkable the way he imagined it all. Actually, all that about the subaltern, and the engagement is sheer fantasy, but my life was very like the poem."

=== Later years ===
She married Harold Wycliffe Jackson, a civil servant in the Ministry of Information, in January 1945, at St Mark's Church in Farnborough. Betjeman was invited, but was unable to attend. The poem was republished in Betjeman's book New Bats in Old Belfries in 1945, and was later mentioned in Flanders and Swann's "Tried by Centre Court".

Joan went abroad with her husband, who ran an upcountry radio station in Singapore. They then lived in Singapore, before returning to the UK in 1955. Harold worked for ITV and then for the BBC in Rhodesia. He died of a heart attack in 1963.

She returned to their home, in Headley, Hampshire, to raise their three young boys (Andrew, Charles and Edward). Despite straitened finances, all three attended Winchester College. She attended the memorial service for Betjeman at Westminster Abbey in 1984. Her letters from Betjeman, contained in a bureau, were stolen in a burglary in 1996.

She was survived by her three sons, one of whom (Edward) continued the family's sporting tradition by representing Cambridge University at both football and cricket.
