= Rudolph Smithen =

James Rudolph Smithen (1942 – March 1, 2026) was the Dean of Antigua.

Smithen was educated at Queen's Theological College and ordained in 1973. After a curacy at St. John's Cathedral Antigua he was Rector of Anguilla before returning to incumbencies in Antigua. He was Chaplain to the Bishop of Antigua from 1980.

Smithen died on March 1, 2026.
