= Cottle =

Cottle may refer to:

== Places ==
- Cottle, Kentucky, United States
- Cottle County, Texas, United States
- Cottle (VTA) rail station, California, United States
- Cottle Church, Nevis, an Anglican church

== Other uses ==
- Cottle (surname)
- USS Cottle (APA-147)
