= Eyre Hutson (priest) =

Barbadoan-born Anglican priest (1830–1915)

Eyre Hutson (1830–1915) was an Anglican priest: most notably Archdeacon of the Virgin Islands from 1885 until his death.

He was born in Barbados on 6 September 1830. He was educated at Codrington College and ordained in 1855. After curacies in Trinidad and Barbados he was Chaplain to the Bishop of Antigua from 1879 until his appointment as Archdeacon with the Rectory of All Saint's, Danish West Indies.

His son Edward was Bishop of Antigua from 1911 until 1936; and Archbishop of the West Indies from 1922. Another son Eyre was Governor of British Honduras 1918 to 1925. A third son John Hutson was President of the Legislative Council of Barbados. His daughter Susan was the mother of grandson Archdeacon of Antigua from 1906 until 1921.
