= Nathaniel Newnham-Davis =

Nathaniel Newnham-Davis might refer to:

- Nathaniel Newnham-Davis (journalist) (1854–1917), British soldier and food writer
- Nathaniel Newnham Davis (bishop) (1903–1966), British Anglican bishop
