= Herbert Mather =

British Anglican bishop (1840–1922)

- Assistant Bishop of Hereford
- Diocese: Diocese of Hereford
- In office: 1905–1912 (ret.)
- Other post: Bishop of Antigua (1897–1904)

Orders
- Ordination: 1867 (deacon) by Connop Thirlwall
- Consecration: 18 July 1897 by Frederick Temple

Personal details
- Born: 8 October 1840 Lancaster, Lancashire, England
- Died: 30 July 1922 (aged 81)
- Denomination: Anglican
- Education: St Andrew's University; Trinity College, Cambridge

Herbert Mather (8 October 1840 – 30 July 1922) was an Anglican bishop in the last decades of the 19th century and the first part of the 20th.

Mather was born in Lancaster, Lancashire on 8 October 1840, the sixth son, and the thirteenth of fifteen children, of merchant John Philips (or Phillips) Mather, of Bootle Hall (near Liverpool) and his wife Elizabeth Vaughan. Herbert was educated at St Andrew's University and Trinity College, Cambridge: he was admitted pensioner on 15 May 1860 and matriculated that Michaelmas; graduated Bachelor of Arts (BA) 1864 and proceeded Master of Arts (Cambridge) (MA Cantab) 1867. He was then ordained into the ministry of the Church of England: he was made deacon on 17 March 1867, by Connop Thirlwall, Bishop of St Davids, at Abergwili parish church. He began his ordained ministry as vice-principal (1865—67) and then the principal (1867–68) of Carmarthen Training College; he then became Curate of Newland, Gloucestershire until 1870.

In 1870, he became both chaplain to Edward Feild, Bishop of Newfoundland; and incumbent of the cathedral. He moved to Nova Scotia two years later, serving there as Chaplain to Hibbert Binney, Bishop of Nova Scotia, til 1873. He made his first return to England in 1874, becoming the rector of All Saints' Church, Huntingdon (1874–77), then Vicar of Loddington, Leicestershire and Chaplain of Launde Abbey (1877–93) and rural dean of Gartree (1886–89). From 1891 to 1897 he was Provost of St Andrew's Cathedral, Inverness when he was appointed to the episcopate as the fourth Bishop of Antigua. He was consecrated into bishop's orders on 18 July 1897 at Lambeth Palace Chapel, by Frederick Temple, Archbishop of Canterbury.

Returning to England again in 1904, he was an Assistant Bishop of Hereford (assisting John Percival) from 1905 until his retirement in 1912. While at Hereford, he was also Rector of Hampton Bishop (1908–12) and Chancellor of Hereford Cathedral (1906–16); at the age of 75, he retired to Beckenham. He was in charge of the vacant Diocese of Accra, 1912–1913. He married in 1872 and had sons including Basil (1895) and at least one other; and became a Doctor of Divinity (DD) in 1897.

Religious titles
Preceded by James Kelly	Provost of St Andrew's Cathedral, Inverness; 1891–1897	Succeeded by Allan Webb
Preceded by Charles Branch	Bishop of Antigua; 1897–1904	Succeeded by Walter Farrar
