= Eyre Hutson =

Eyre Hutson may refer to:

- Eyre Hutson (priest), Archdeacon of the Virgin Islands from 1885 to 1921
- Sir Eyre Hutson (colonial administrator), Governor of British Honduras 1918 to 1925, son of the above
