= Orland Lindsay =

Antiguan Anglican clergyman (1928–2023)

Orland Ugham Lindsay (24 March 1928 – 10 December 2023) was an Antiguan Anglican clergyman. He served as the Bishop of Antigua from 1970 to 1996; and for much of that time also Archbishop of the West Indies.

== Career ==
Born on 24 March 1928, Lindsay was educated at McGill University. He was ordained in 1957 after World War II service with the RAF, and a brief career as a schoolteacher. He was curate of St Peter's Vere, Jamaica, and then priest in charge of Manchioneal Cure. From 1963 to 1966 he was Captain and Chaplain to the Jamaica Defence Force. From 1968, he was the principal of the Church Teachers’ College in Mandeville until his ordination to the episcopate.

Lindsay was a Freemason in both the West Indies and the British Isles, and a Past Grand Chaplain of the United Grand Lodge of England.

== Personal life and death ==
His wife predeceased him in November 2021. He died at a hospital in St. John's on 10 December 2023, at the age of 95.

Anglican Communion titles
Preceded by Donald Rowland Knowles	Bishop of Antigua; 1970–1996	Succeeded by Leroy Errol Brooks
Preceded by George Cuthbert Manning Woodroffe	Primate of the West Indies; 1986–1996	Succeeded by Drexel William Gomez
