= Edward Hutson =

Edward Hutson CMG (1871–1936) was a long-serving Anglican Bishop of Antigua from 1911 until his death and, from 1921, Archbishop of the West Indies.

Hutson was educated at Codrington College and Durham University and ordained in 1896. He was curate of All Saints' Antigua and then the rector of St Paul's St Croix. During this time he was also a canon of St John's Cathedral and an examining chaplain to Walter Farrar, Bishop of Antigua, until he was himself appointed to the position.

He was appointed a Companion of the Order of St Michael and St George (CMG) in the 1925 Birthday Honours.

Anglican Communion titles
Preceded by Walter Farrar	Bishop of Antigua; 1911 – 1936	Succeeded by George Hand
Preceded by Edward Parry	Primate of the West Indies; 1921 – 1936	Succeeded by Edward Dunn
