= Thomas Farrar =

Thomas Farrar was Archdeacon of Berbice from 1884 until his death in 1893.

He was ordained in 1856 and was curate of the Upper Berbice River and then Chaplain to the penal colony there. He was then Rector of Demerara until his appointment as Archdeacon.

His son Walter was also a clergyman of the Caribbean region, as well as England.
