= Henry Jackson (colonial administrator) =

British Army officer and colonial governor (1849–1908)

Captain Sir Henry Moore Jackson GCMG
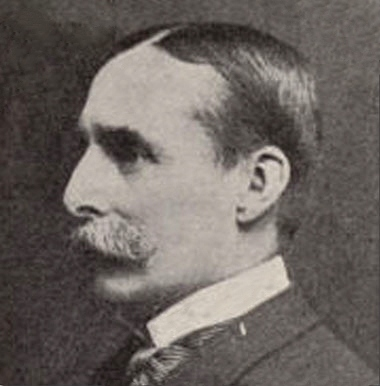

31st Governor of the Leeward Islands
- In office 1901–1902
- Preceded by: Sir Francis Fleming
- Succeeded by: Sir Gerald Strickland

6th High Commissioner for the Western Pacific
- In office 10 September 1902 – 11 October 1904
- Preceded by: Sir William Allardyce (acting)
- Succeeded by: Everard im Thurn

7th Governor of Fiji
- In office 10 September 1902 – 11 October 1904
- Preceded by: Sir William Allardyce (acting)
- Succeeded by: Everard im Thurn

5th Governor of Trinidad and Tobago
- In office 30 August 1904 – 29 August 1908
- Preceded by: Cornelius Alfred Moloney
- Succeeded by: George Le Hunte

Personal details
- Born: 1849 Barbados
- Died: 29 August 1908 (aged 58–59) Trinidad and Tobago
- Spouse: Emily Shea (m. 1881)
- Children: Sir Edward St. John Jackson; Sir Wilfrid Edward Francis Jackson; Basil Jackson
- Parent: Walrond Jackson (father)
- Education: Clifton College, Royal Military Academy, Woolwich

Captain Sir Henry Moore Jackson, GCMG (bapt. 13 August 1849 – 29 August 1908) was a British Army officer and colonial governor.

== Biography ==
Jackson was born in Barbados to Walrond Jackson, who became the Anglican Bishop of Antigua, and Mary Shepherd. He received his education in England at Clifton College and the Royal Military Academy. After his education, Jackson went into the military, serving for the Royal Artillery from 1870 to 1885, reaching the rank of captain. In 1880, while still in the Royal Artillery, he was also appointed commandant of the Sierra Leone police.

It was after his military service that he became involved in the rule of British colonies. Starting with his appointment as commissioner for Turks and Caicos Islands from 1885 to 1890 and later Colonial Secretary of the Bahama Islands from 1890 to 1893. His next appointment came in 1894, when he was appointed as Colonial Secretary of Gibraltar, from 1894 to 1901. Here his education in science proved useful in implementing a plan to construct a new harbour. In August 1901, he was appointed Governor of the Leeward Islands, but his tenure there was short as in June the following year he was appointed Governor of Fiji and High Commissioner of the Western Pacific, combined with the position of Consul-General for the Western Pacific Islands.

He arrived in Fiji to take up the position in September 1902, and is credited as having promoted the idea of British rule to the natives of Fiji. Australian Methodists protested against his appointment as he was a Catholic, provoking counter-protests in Fiji. The last position he held was Governor of Trinidad and Tobago, which he held until his death on 29 August 1908.

Jackson received several honours, including: Knight Commander of the Order of St Michael and St George in 1899, promoted to Knight Grand Cross in 1908, and member of the Order of St. Gregory the Great in 1904.

Jackson died in London on 29 August 1908 and was buried at St Mary Magdalen Church, Mortlake.

== Family ==
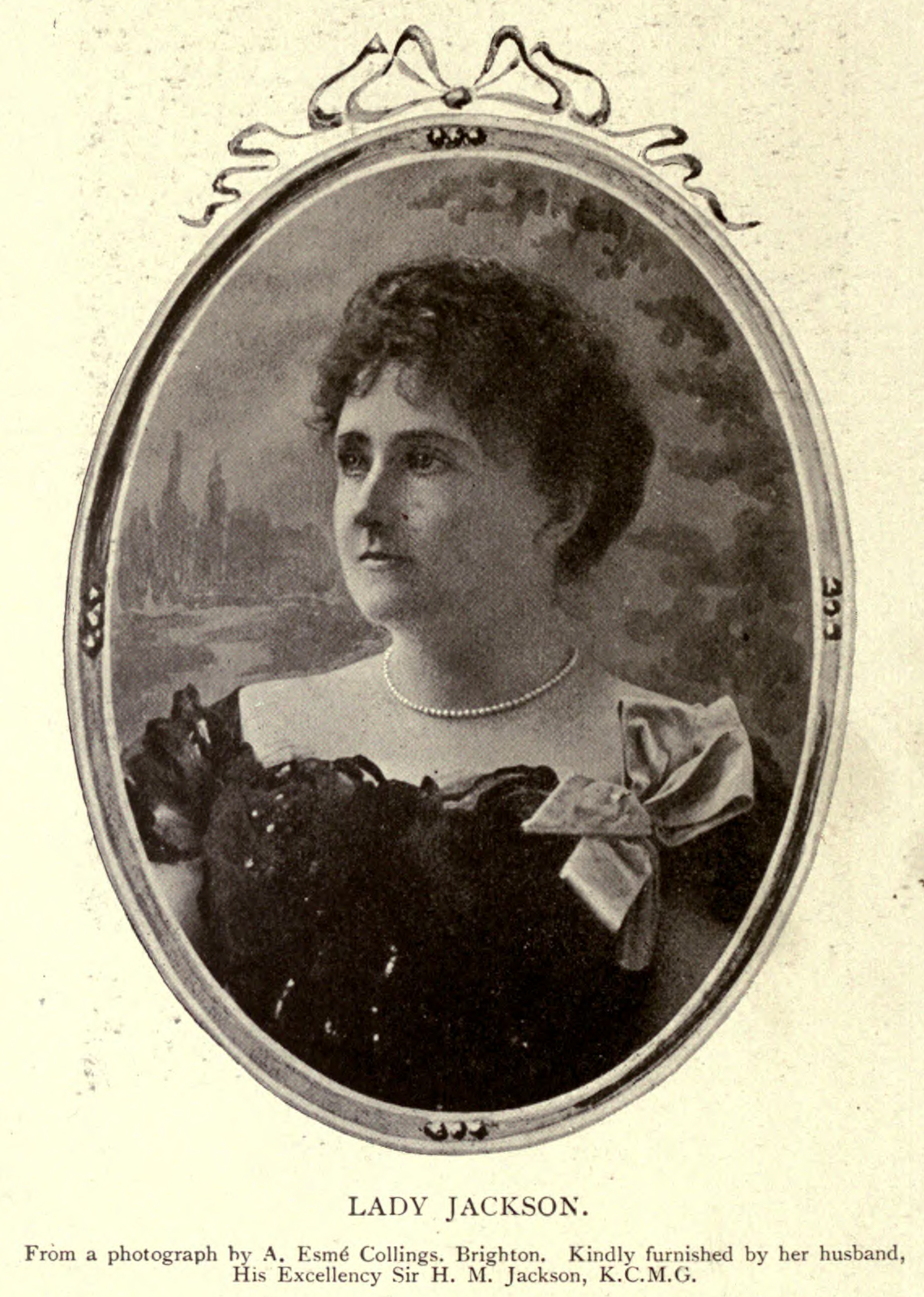
Lady Jackson (née Emily Shea)

In 1881, Jackson married Emily Shea, daughter of Sir Edward Dalton Shea. He was the father of Basil Jackson, chairman of BP. In 1880, Jackson converted to Catholicism.

Government offices
Preceded by Sir Francis Fleming	Governor of the Leeward Islands; 1901–1902	Succeeded by Sir Gerald Strickland
Preceded by William Lamond Allardyce, acting	High Commissioner for the Western Pacific; 1902–1904	Succeeded by Sir Everard im Thurn
Preceded by William Lamond Allardyce, acting	Governor of Fiji; 1902–1904	Succeeded by Sir Everard im Thurn
Preceded by Sir Cornelius Alfred Moloney	Governor of Trinidad and Tobago; 1904–1908	Succeeded by Sir George Ruthven Le Hunte
