= Philip Hilborne =

Philip Henry Cecil Hilborne was Archdeacon of Antigua from 1945 to 1950.

Pilgrim was educated at Codrington College and ordained in 1930. After a curacy at St John's Cathedral, Antigua he held incumbencies in Barbados and Antigua.
