= George Hand (bishop) =

George Sumner Hand was a Colonial Anglican Bishop in the first half of the 20th century.

He was educated at Bloxham School and St John's College, Oxford. He was Rector of St Lawrence with St Gregory, Norwich and later was Dean of St John's Cathedral, Antigua. Before his elevation to the episcopate as bishop of that island in 1937; he was consecrated a bishop on St Peter's Day 1937 (29 June), by Cosmo Lang, Archbishop of Canterbury, at St Paul's Cathedral. He retired in 1944 and died the following year.

== Notes ==
Church of England titles
Preceded by Edward Hutson	Bishop of Antigua; 1937 – 1944	Succeeded by Nathaniel Newnham Davis
