= Fitzroy Pestaina =

Fitzroy Elderfield Pestaina was the Dean of Antigua from 1972 until 1976.

Pestaina was educated at Codrington College and ordained in 1945. He was successively: Curate at Christ Church, Barbados then Saint Michael, Barbados; Vicar of All Saints, Barbados; Rector of St Lucy, Barbados and then of Saint Peter, Barbados before his time as Dean.

He died on 16 December, 1976.
