= Walrond Jackson =

William Walrond Jackson
- Born: 9 January 1811
- Died: 25 November 1895 (aged 84); Ealing, London, England
- Education: Codrington College
- Occupations: Bishop of Antigua, 1860–1879
- Spouse: Mary Pile
- Relatives: William Jacson (son); Henry Jackson (son)

William Walrond Jackson (9 January 1811 – 25 November 1895) was Bishop of Antigua from 1860 to 1879.

== Life ==
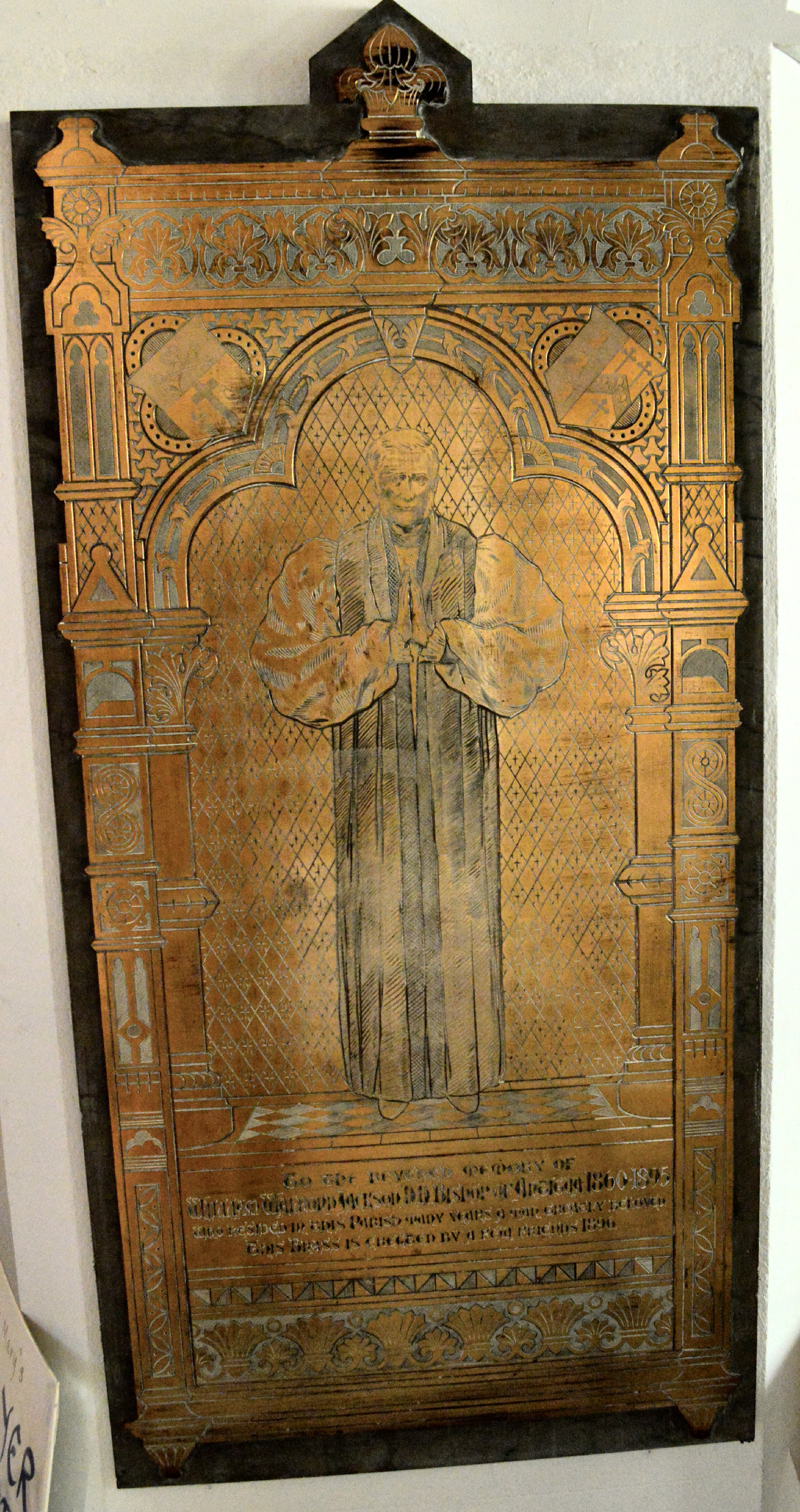
Memorial brass, St Mary's Church, Ealing

He was the son of William Jackson of Macclesfield, Cheshire, England, and Mary Judith Walrond. Jackson was educated at Codrington College, Barbados and Queens' College, Cambridge (although his degrees, awarded later, were Lambeth degrees), and ordained in 1834.

After a curacy at Holy Trinity, Trinidad, he held incumbencies in St Vincent and Barbados. From 1846 to 1860 he was Chaplain to the Forces when he was appointed to the episcopate. He was consecrated a bishop on 17 May 1860, and returned to England through ill health in 1879. He retained his See only in the legal sense, with the work carried out by coadjutor bishops John Mitchinson (until 1882) and Charles Branch. Jackson died on 25 November 1895, aged 84, at home in Ealing, West London.

== Family ==
Jackson married Mary Pile, daughter of Conrade Pile of the Brighton estate, Barbados. Of their sons, William became Rector of Exeter College, Oxford, and Henry became Governor of the Leeward Islands, then Fiji, then Trinidad and Tobago.
