= Donald Knowles =

Anglican bishop (1898–1977)

Donald Rowland Knowles OBE (14 July 1898 – 26 September 1977) was an Anglican bishop. He was the first Bahamian-born Archdeacon of the Bahamas and served as Bishop of Antigua from 1953 to 1969.

== Life and career ==
Knowles was born on Long Island, Bahamas, on 14 July 1898. He was educated at Hatfield College, Durham, and was ordained in 1923.

He began his ministry as a curate on Andros, and subsequently served as priest-in-charge on Acklins and rector of St Matthew's Church, Nassau. He later became Archdeacon of the Bahamas.

In 1953, Knowles was consecrated Bishop of Antigua, serving in the post until his retirement at the end of 1969. He died on 26 September 1977, aged 79.

Church of England titles
Preceded by Nathaniel Newnham Davis	Bishop of Antigua; 1953–1969	Succeeded by Orland Ugham Lindsay
