= St. Matthew's Anglican Church, Nassau =

Historic church in Nassau, Bahamas

Coordinates: 25°04′27″N 77°19′35″W

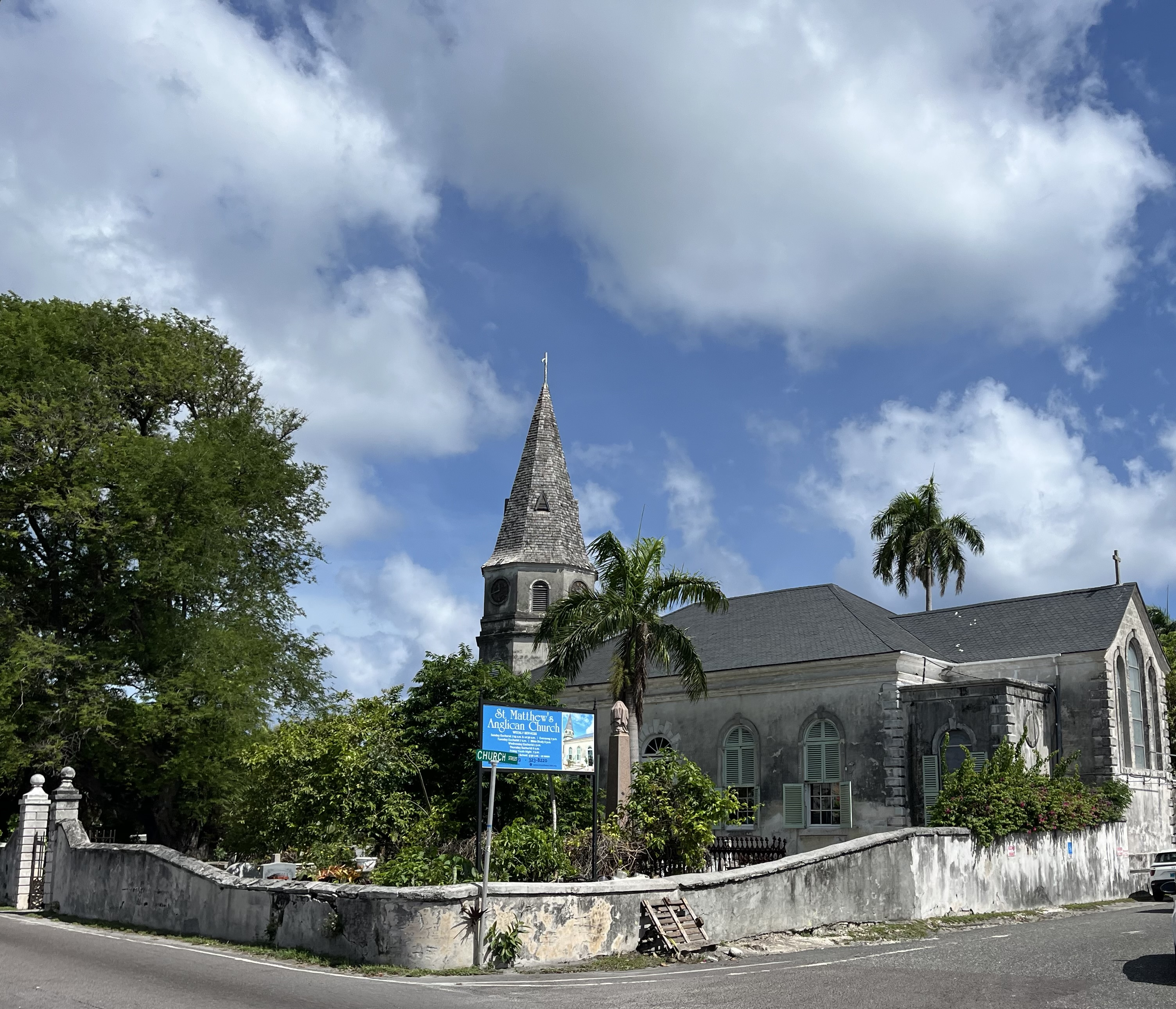
St. Matthew's Anglican Church, Nassau

St. Matthew's Anglican Church is an historic church in Nassau, Bahamas.

It has the distinction of having the oldest church building in the Bahamas and potentially the oldest subsisting building in New Providence.

== History ==
In the early 18th century, as the population of the island expanded, the challenge of accommodating worshippers in the island's single church became apparent.

Reverend Robert Carter, the island's sole clergyman and the rector of Christ Church Cathedral, Nassau, began carrying out services from a house to cater to the needs of the growing population.

By 1796, it was evident that the town's expansion necessitated the construction of a chapel in the Eastern District. In 1799, the Legislative Council passed an act to build a church in the east, which led to the establishment of St. Matthew's Church.

== Construction and architecture ==
The government contributed three thousand pounds and the construction was entrusted to Mr. Joseph Eve. However, the final cost exceeded seven thousand pounds.

The foundation stone was laid in 1800. When completed in 1802, the church boasted a seating capacity of approximately four hundred and fifty people.

The church held its first service on 18 July 1802, officiated by the first rector, Reverend Henry Groombridge.

A steeple was erected in 1807 or 1816 and the church consecrated in 1823, 21 years after its first service.

In 1918, the church was temporarily closed as the roof and ceiling were repaired and new organ was also purchased.

Over the years, a chancel was added, accompanied by a stone pulpit.

== Clergy ==
Notable figures in the church's history included:

- Reverend Henry Groombridge, the church's first rector;
- Rev. William Strachan, who was appointed the first live-in rector in 1826;
- Rev. Richardson Saunders, known affectionately as "Parson," served as rector from 1856 until his death in 1903, leaving an indelible impact on the church community;
- Rt. Rev. Donald Knowles who assumed the role of rector in 1951, and became the first Bahamian-born Archdeacon;
- Archdeacon James Palacious, rector from 1988 to 2004;
- Canon, the Rev Dr. Kirkley Sands, rector (1986).

== Legacy ==
St. Matthew's Church, with its rich history, architectural significance, and continuous role in spiritual and community life, remains a symbol of faith and heritage in the Bahamas, firmly rooted in the island's history.
