= Errol Brooks =

Bishop of Antigua

Leroy Errol Brooks (known as Errol; born 1951) was the 12th Bishop of Antigua; his See was NECA (Anglican Diocese of North East Caribbean and Aruba).

Brooks was born in 1951 and educated at Codrington College and the University of the West Indies. He was ordained in 1974 and began his career as a curate at St. John's Cathedral, St. John's, the church at which he was to be consecrated coadjutor bishop in 1994 and became diocesan in 1996. Brooks retired in October 2021.

Anglican Communion titles
Preceded by Orland Lindsay	Bishop of Antigua; 1996–2021
