= Andrew Hunter Dunn =

Canadian Anglican bishop

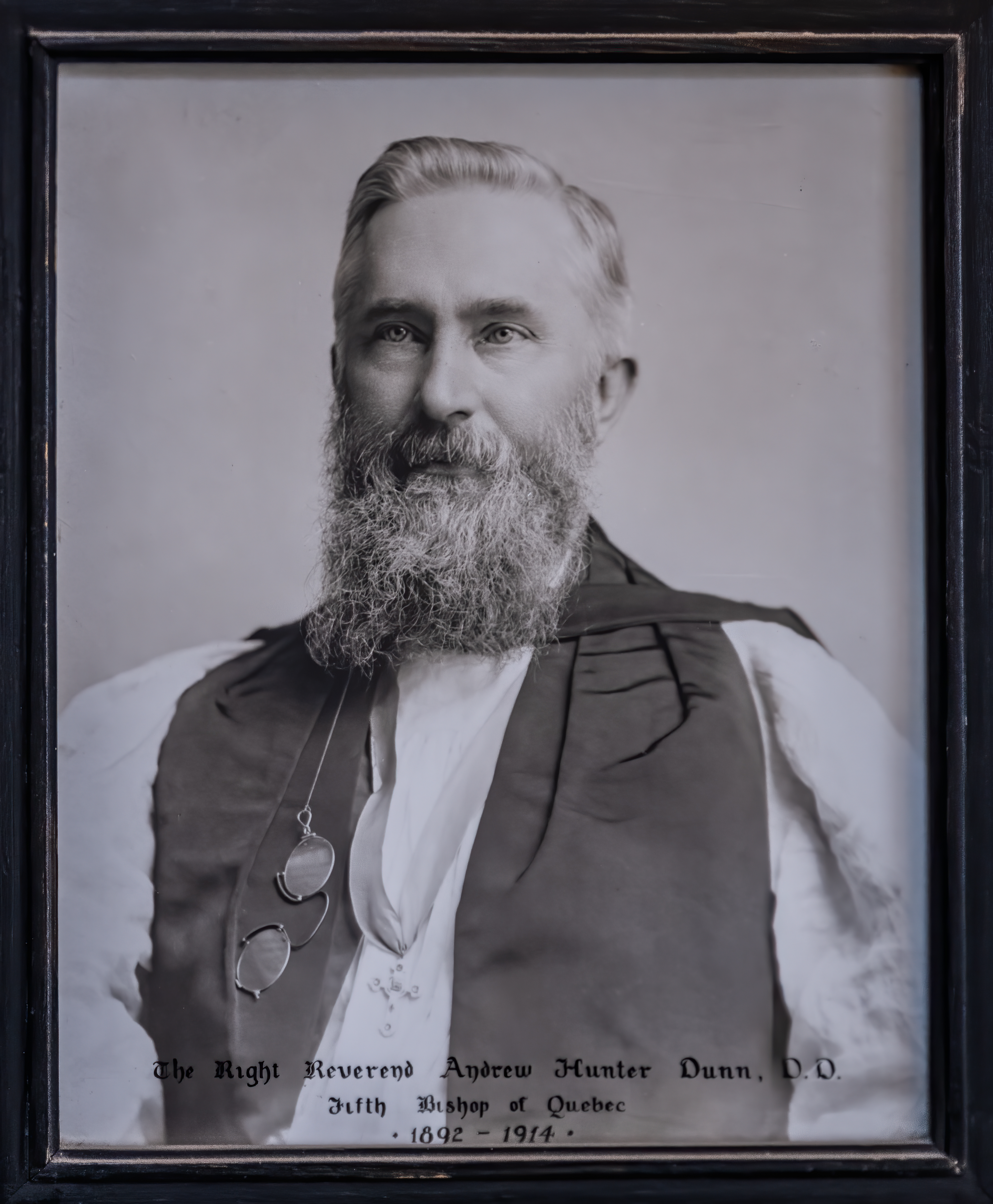
- Born: October 16, 1839; Saffron Walden, England
- Died: November 14, 1914 (aged 75); At sea
- Occupation: Anglican priest
- Known for: Being the Bishop of Quebec from 1892 to 1914
- Spouse: Alice Hunter
- Children: Edward Dunn
- Parent(s): Hannebal Dunn; Mary Ann Hunter

Andrew Hunter Dunn (16 October 1839 – 14 November 1914) was an eminent Anglican priest, the fifth Bishop of Quebec. Head of Bishop's University and Bishop's College School.

Dunn was born in Saffron Walden in 1839, son of Hannebal (Hannibal) Dunn and Mary Ann Hunter. His mother was the daughter of William Hunter, who was Lord Mayor of London in 1852. Educated at Corpus Christi College, Cambridge, he graduated BA as 29th Wrangler in 1863. Ordained in 1864, his first post was a curacy at St Mark's, Notting Hill. In 1870 he became curate, and in 1872 Vicar, of All Saints, South Acton. In 1892 he was appointed to the episcopate, as the fifth Bishop of Quebec. In 1893 he received an honorary DD from the University of Cambridge. He remained Bishop of Quebec until his sudden death on board ship, homeward bound.

He married his 1st cousin Alice Hunter, with whom he had five sons and two daughters. His son Edward was also a bishop, and his grand daughter Joan was the muse of John Betjeman.

Anglican Communion titles
Preceded by James Williams	Bishop of Quebec; 1892 – 1914	Succeeded by Lennox Williams
