= Edward Jackson (cricketer, born 1955) =

English cricketer (born 1955)

Personal information
- Full name: Edward John Wycliffe Jackson
- Born: 26 March 1955 (age 71); Kuala Lumpur, British Malaya
- Batting: Right-handed
- Bowling: Left-arm medium-fast

Domestic team information
- Years: Team
- 1974–1976: Cambridge University

Career statistics
Competition	First-class	List A
Matches	28	6
Runs scored	762	50
Batting average	16.93	10.00
100s/50s	–/2	–/–
Top score	63	32
Balls bowled	3,886	324
Wickets	43	10
Bowling average	51.51	22.00
5 wickets in innings	1	–
10 wickets in match	1	–
Best bowling	7/98	3/27
Catches/stumpings	4/–	–/–
- Source: Cricinfo, 3 September 2019

Edward John Wycliffe Jackson (born 26 March 1955) is an English former cricketer.

Jackson was born at Kuala Lumpur in British Malaya (his mother was Joan Hunter Dunn), and was educated in England at Winchester College, before going up to Pembroke College, Cambridge. While studying at Cambridge, he made his debut in first-class cricket for Cambridge University against Leicestershire at Fenner's in 1974. He played first-class cricket for Cambridge until 1976, making 27 appearances. Playing as an all-rounder, he scored 694 runs in his 27 appearances for Cambridge, at an average of 16.13 and a high score of 63. With his left-arm medium-fast bowling, Jackson took 42 wickets at a bowling average of 50.73. Though largely ineffective with the ball, he did take a five wicket haul against Oxford University in The University Match of 1975, with Jackson finishing with ten wickets in the match and accounting for nearly a quarter of his career first-class wicket tally in the process. Jackson also made a single first-class appearance for a combined Oxford and Cambridge Universities cricket team against the touring West Indians in 1976. In addition to playing first-class cricket while at Cambridge, he also represented the university List A one-day cricket, making four appearances in the 1974 Benson & Hedges Cup, before making two List A appearances for the Combined Universities cricket team in the 1976 Benson & Hedges Cup.
