= Archbishop of the West Indies =

Title of an Anglican primate in the Caribbean region

- Archbishopric

Anglican
- Incumbent: Philip S. Wright
- Style: The Most Reverend

Location
- Territory: Barbados, Belize, Guyana, Jamaica, the Bahamas, the North-Eastern Caribbean and Aruba, Trinidad and Tobago, and the Windward Islands

Information
- First holder: Enos Nuttall
- Formation: 1897
- Denomination: Anglican
- Parent church: Church in the Province of the West Indies

The Archbishop of the West Indies is the Anglican primate of the Province of the West Indies, part of the worldwide Anglican Communion.

== History ==
The West Indies became a self-governing province of the Church of England in 1883, when William Piercy Austin (who had been Bishop of Guyana since 1842) was appointed the first Primate. The title was changed from Primate to Archbishop (and Primate) in 1897.

The title of Archbishop is invariably held concurrently with that of bishop of one of the eight dioceses of the province, and it is common for the most senior bishop in the province to be elected as archbishop.

== Primates ==
- William Piercy Austin (1884–1891)
- Enos Nuttall (1892–1897)

== Archbishops ==
- Enos Nuttall (1897 – 1915)
- Edward Parry (1916 – 1921)
- Edward Hutson (1921 – 1936)
- Edward Arthur Dunn (1936 – 1943)
- Arthur Henry Anstey (1943 – 1945)
- William George Hardie (1945 – 1950)
- Alan John Knight (1951 – 1979)
- George Cuthbert Manning Woodroffe (1979 – 1986)
- Orland Ugham Lindsay (1986 – 1996)
- Drexel Wellington Gomez (1996 – 2009)
- John Walder Dunlop Holder (2009 – 2018)
- Howard Gregory (2019 – 2024)
- Philip S. Wright (Since 2025)

== Bishops ==
The bishops within the Archbishop's province are from two "mainland" dioceses (Belize and Guyana) and six island dioceses.

- Anglican Diocese of Belize
- Anglican Diocese of Guyana
- Diocese of The Bahamas and the Turks and Caicos Islands
- Diocese of Barbados
- Diocese of Jamaica and the Cayman Islands
- Diocese of the North East Caribbean and Aruba
- Anglican Diocese of Trinidad and Tobago
- Anglican Diocese of the Windward Islands

== See also ==
- Anglican Churches in the Americas
