= John Mitchinson =

John Mitchinson may refer to

- John Mitchinson (bishop) (1833–1918), English-born Bishop of Barbados
- John Mitchinson (researcher), head of research for the British TV quiz QI
- John Mitchinson (tenor) (born 1932), English operatic singer
