= Anglican churches in the Americas =

The following is a list of Anglican churches in the Americas.

== Anglican Communion churches ==
The Anglican churches in North and South America include the following member churches of the Anglican Communion.

In descending order by size:

- The Episcopal Church, in the United States (including Puerto Rico and the United States Virgin Islands), Colombia, the Dominican Republic, Ecuador, Haiti, Honduras, Venezuela, and the British Virgin Islands (2,369,477 members, including members outside the Americas in Hawaii, Taiwan and Europe).
- The Anglican Church of Canada, (645,000 members)
- The Church in the Province of the West Indies, in Anguilla, Aruba, Antigua, the Bahamas, Barbados, Barbuda, Belize, the Cayman Islands, Dominica, French Guiana, Guyana, Jamaica, Montserrat, Saba, Saint Barthélemy, Sint Eustatius, Saint Kitts and Nevis, St. Martin, Suriname, Trinidad and Tobago, Turks and Caicos, and the Windward Islands (770,000 members)
- The Anglican Episcopal Church of Brazil, (120,000 members)
- The Anglican Church of Mexico, (25,000 members)
- The Anglican Church in Central America, in Costa Rica, El Salvador, Guatemala, Nicaragua, and Panama (24,800 members)
- The Anglican Church of South America, in Argentina, Bolivia, Canada, Chile, Paraguay, Peru, and Uruguay (22,490 members)
- The Episcopal Church of Cuba, a diocese within the Atlantic Province, The Episcopal Church (10,000 members)
- The Anglican Church of Bermuda (extraprovincial to the Archbishop of Canterbury)
- The Parish of the Falkland Islands (extraprovincial to the Archbishop of Canterbury)
- The Church of South India maintains several churches in the United States under an agreement with the Episcopal Church.

== Non-Anglican Communion churches ==
The following churches in the Americas, in the Anglican tradition, are not members of the Anglican Communion.

In alphabetical order:

- The Anglican Catholic Church, in the United States, Colombia, Ecuador, and Haiti (10,000 members)
- The Anglican Catholic Church of Canada, in Canada
- The Anglican Church in America, in the United States, Belize, El Salvador, Guatemala, and Mexico (5,200 members)
- The Anglican Church in North America, in the United States and Canada
- The Anglican Episcopal Church, in the United States
- The Anglican Mission in the Americas (a missionary jurisdiction in the USA under the authority of the Episcopal Church of the Province of Rwanda and the Anglican Church of the Province of South East Asia) in the Anglican Communion
- The Anglican Orthodox Church, in the United States and Canada
- The Anglican Province of America, in the United States (6,000 members)
- The Anglican Province of Christ the King, in the United States (8,000 members)
- The Christian Episcopal Church, in the United States and Canada
- The Communion of Evangelical Episcopal Churches, in the United States and Canada
- The Convocation of Anglicans in North America, in the United States (a missionary jurisdiction in the USA under the authority the Church of Nigeria in the Anglican Communion)
- The Episcopal Diocese of South Carolina
- The Episcopal Missionary Church, in the United States
- The Orthodox Anglican Church, in the United States
- The Reformed Episcopal Church, in the United States, Canada, Cuba and Brazil (13,400 members, including members outside the Americas in Germany, India and Liberia.)
- The United Episcopal Church of North America, in the United States
