= Samuel Branch =

Barbadoan-born Anglican priest (1861–1932)

Samuel Edward Branch, OBE (25 March 1861, in Barbados – 9 July 1932, in Antigua) was an Anglican priest: most notably Archdeacon of Antigua from 1906 until 1921.

He was born in Barbados, the son of Charles Branch and Susan, daughter of Eyre Hutson. He was educated at The Lodge School and Codrington College. He was ordained in 1886 by his father. Branch was Headmaster of Antigua Grammar School from 1884 to 1927.
