= Nathaniel Newnham Davis (bishop) =

Nathaniel William Newnham Davis (17 July 1903 – 28 July 1966) was a Colonial Anglican Bishop in the mid 20th century.

He was born on 17 July 1903 and educated at Harrow and Merton College, Oxford. After a period of study at Ripon College Cuddesdon he was ordained in 1927 and began his career as a curate of Church of Holy Spirit, Beeston Hill. From 1931 he was Rector of St Anne, Sandy Point in St Kitts and then the island's Archdeacon. He was elevated to the episcopate as Bishop of Antigua in 1944 and resigned in 1952. He was an Assistant Bishop of Coventry from then until 1959 and then Warden of the United Westminster Almshouses until his death on 28 July 1966.

Church of England titles
Preceded by George Hand	Bishop of Antigua; 1944–1952	Succeeded by Donald Knowles
