= Charles Branch =

Antiguan and Barbudan bishop and priest

Charles James Branch (7 October 1834 – 31 August 1896) was an Anglican priest: most notably Bishop of Antigua from 1885 until his death.

He was born in Barbados on 7 October 1834 and educated at Codrington College there. He was appointed curate of St. Simon's, Barbados, in 1857; rector of St. Andrew's, Grenada, in 1864; rector of St John's, Saint Croix, Virgin Islands in 1866; and Archdeacon of Antigua, in 1879. He was consecrated bishop coadjutor of Antigua, in the chapel of Lambeth Palace, on 25 July 1882 by Archibald Campbell Tait, Archbishop of Canterbury. He received an honorary Doctor of Divinity from Durham University in 1882. He automatically succeeded to the diocesan See of Antigua on Walrond Jackson's death, 25 November 1895; but died himself within the year — at St Kitts on 31 August 1896.

His son, Samuel Edward, was also Archdeacon of the island.

== See also ==
=== Archives ===
There is a Charles James Branch fonds at Library and Archives Canada. The archival reference number is MG55/29-No44.
