= Daniel Davis (bishop) =

British bishop and abolitionist

Daniel Gateward Davis
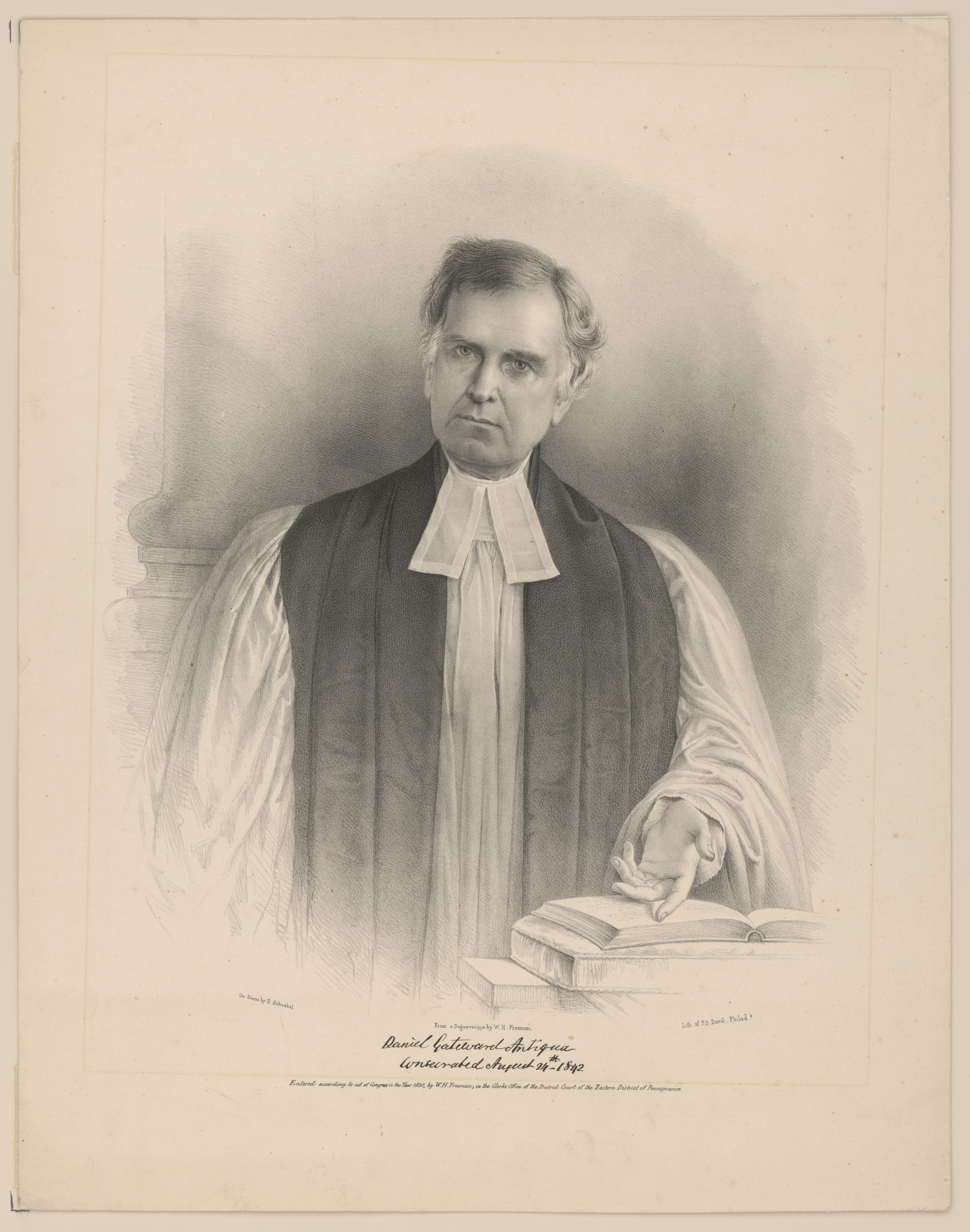
- Born: 1788
- Died: 1857 (aged 68–69)
- Education: Pembroke College, Oxford
- Occupations: Abolitionist, Bishop of Antigua
- Known for: Advocacy for abolition of slavery
- Notable work: Inaugural Bishop of Antigua

Daniel Gateward Davis (1788–1857) was an abolitionist and the inaugural Bishop of Antigua from 1842 until his death.

== Early life ==
Daniel Davis was born in 1788, the youngest of six children of William and Anne Davis of St Kitts. His father was a planter.

Davis began studies at Pembroke College, Oxford in 1808. There he became an abolitionist and a friend of William Wilberforce.

== Ministry ==
Davis returned to the Leeward Islands and worked strongly, but quietly, for abolition in St. Kitts and Nevis. He later became a minister at St. Paul's Anglican Church in Nevis, and in 1824, became the first minister at the newly built Cottle Church.

He found that St Kitts and Nevis were playing a part on behalf of the abolitionists out of all proportion to their size and importance. This was due to two prominent residents of St Kitts, James Ramsay (who had introduced William Wilberforce to the abolition movement) and James Stephen, a lawyer. Both these men were so outspoken in their abhorrence of slavery that after much persecution from other members of the plantocracy they were forced to leave the island; but not before they had been able over a long period to send detailed accounts of the ill treatment of slaves in the two islands to Wilberforce and other abolitionists fighting for the cause in England. Events in these two small islands became very influential in determining the final victory for abolition.

By 1812 when he was ordained Davis was in two minds whether to take up the rectorship he had been offered of St. Paul’s, Charlestown. He wished to see his family again but this feeling was dampened by the idea of returning to a land of slaves. But he came back, and stayed. In a letter to an abolitionist friend he wrote, “it will be my great objective to encourage the extensive propagation of our religion among the negroes, as well as to improve the impression which has already been made on the white inhabitants. It ought indeed to be considered disgraceful to the policy of any society, that the space of nearly three centuries should have expired since one people or other, professing civilization and Christianity, have made but feeble efforts, or rather no efforts, for the extension of their blessings among the laborious and ignorant”.

But it was not to be an easy ministry. He found that neither planters nor their field slaves were much interested in his invitations to come for worship and instruction. It was not until 1818 that, under the pressure of the ameliorative policies of the British government, local political circles were forced to accept that attitudes had changed back in Britain. With the help of the vigorous leadership in the church of Beilby Porteus, the Bishop of London, Davis was slowly able to make progress. By 1822 there were Sunday schools in every parish in Nevis. Slaves on enlightened plantations were allowed markets on days other than Sundays that had otherwise prevented them from attending church. But above all Davis had begun to win the support of a growing number of planters to the cause of conversion. Towards the end of 1821 Thomas Cottle, a former President of the Island Council and a prominent planter, came forward with a proposal to build this church.

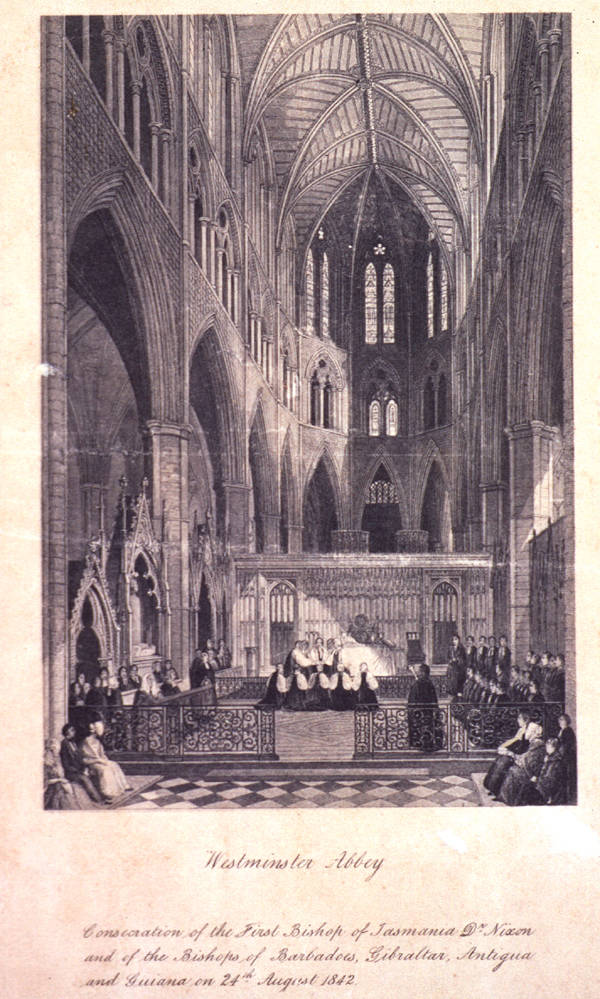
Davis' consecration

In 1824 two Bishops (known for their opposition to slavery) were appointed for the newly created Sees of Jamaica (Bishop Lipscomb) and Barbados with the Leeward Islands (Bishop Coleridge). This was a signal to the local plantocracy that the British government was now fully committed to the policy of improving the condition of slaves in its colonies and was conscious that full freedom could not be very long delayed.

By the time Davis left the island for St Kitts 19 schools with an aggregate attendance of 1,247 slave pupils had been established; and just before his departure he founded, along with those who supported his views, a branch society of the Society for the Conversion of Slaves. The most active promoters of the new society’s first meeting were Thomas Cottle and Norton Herbert, the nephew of Frances, Lady Nelson.

Davis remained in St Kitts until 1838 and later became the first Bishop of Antigua. On 24 August 1842, Davis was consecrated a bishop at Westminster Abbey. Fierce to the end in attacking racial prejudice from whatever quarter it appeared, Davis died in London, aged 70, in 1857.

== Bibliography ==
- Hubbard, Vincent K. 2002. "Swords, Ships & Sugar". Premiere Editions International, Inc. ISBN 978-1-891519-05-5, p. 156. A complete history of Nevis.
- G P J Walker, “The Life of Daniel Gateward Davis – First Bishop of Antigua”
