= Gitta Gradova =

American pianist (1904–1985)

Gertrude Weinstock
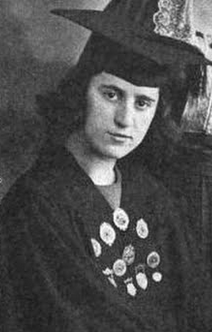
- Gradova from a 1920 publication
- Born: Gertrude Weinstock; June 8, 1904; Chicago, Illinois, U.S.
- Died: April 26, 1985 (aged 81); Chicago, Illinois, U.S.

Gitta Gradova (August 8, 1904 – April 26, 1985) was an American pianist.

== Early life ==
Gradova was born as Gertrude Weinstock on August 8, 1904 in Chicago, Illinois, US. The daughter of Russian-Jewish immigrants to the United States, she was the youngest child of Joseph and Sonya Weinstock. Her father, Joseph Weinstock, was a rabbi by profession; both of her parents had been actors in Yiddish theatre when young. Identified as a musical talent in childhood she was already performing as a soloist in Chicago before her teens. Her teacher in Chicago from age 7 was Esther Harris Dua. Gradova was sent to New York at age 13, to study piano with Sergei Prokofiev.

== Career ==
At 19, Gitta Gradova performed with the New York Philharmonic Orchestra in 1923. It was around this time that she adopted the stage name of "Gitta Gradova".

She was a friend of Sergei Rachmaninoff and Vladimir Horowitz; Arturo Toscanini praised her work. "Miss Gradova is a pianist whose own brilliancy, accuracy, and forcefulness become a transforming medium for what she plays," wrote a Chicago critic in 1931. She toured in Europe in 1935, and was featured at the Chicago's outdoor Ravinia Festival in 1938 and 1941.

Although she retired from performing in 1942, she never stopped practicing daily at home; she taught piano, and played for guests and friends, according to her son. At the time of her death, she was planning a return to the concert stage, to play Rachmaninoff's First Piano Concerto with the Chicago Symphony under James Levine. It is said in her son's memoir, that she had confided in one of her grandchildren that she was nervous about the performance.

== Personal life ==
She married a doctor, Maurice Cottle. They lived in Chicago, and had two children, Thomas and Judy; both earned PhDs and Judy became a cabaret singer in New York. She also had a brother, Marcus Weinstock and a two nephews, Richard Weinstock and John Weinstock. Gitta Gradova died in 1985, aged 80, in Chicago. Her son Thomas Cottle wrote a memoir about her, When the Music Stopped: Discovering my Mother (SUNY Press 2004). Several recordings of her playing, including a private 1950 recording of Gradova and Horowitz playing a Mozart piano duet, are now available online.
