= Sibella Cottle =

Sibella Cottle was the mistress of Sir Henry Lynch-Blosse, 7th Baronet (popularly known as Sir Harry; 1749–88) of Balla, County Mayo, Ireland.

== Biography ==
His family conformed to Protestantism in the mid-18th century. She had seven children by him, each of whom was left a generous legacy in their father's will of 1788.

Cottle was portrayed by Matthew Archdeacon as uneducated and a "professed woman of pleasure." T. H. Nally maintained she was not a peasant but joined Sir Harry as a governess from a local Big House.

Sir Harry was urged to abandon Cottle and marry a woman of his own class and religion. Cottle reputedly responded by commissioning a powerful love charm, the spancel of death (Irish: an buarach bháis). The spancel has been described as "an unbroken hoop of skin cut with incantations from a corpse across the entire body from shoulder to footsole and wrapped in silk of the colours of the rainbow and used as a spancel to tie the legs of a person to produce certain effects of witchcraft." According to Nally, the love charm was made by Judy Holian, an bhean feasa (a woman of knowledge and wisdom), from the corpse of Harry's illegitimate daughter by another woman. Holian, reputedly a local witch, guaranteed that Sir Harry would be spellbound for life should Cottle apply the spancel to him.
