= Christopher Cottle =

American lawyer and jurist

Christopher Clarke Cottle
- Born: May 18, 1940; Los Angeles, California, U.S.
- Education: Stanford University (B.A.); University of California, Hastings College of the Law (J.D.)
- Occupations: Lawyer, jurist
- Years active: 1966–2001 (Judicial service)

Christopher Clarke Cottle (born May 18, 1940) is an American lawyer and jurist, who served as the Presiding Justice of the California Sixth District Court of Appeal from 1993 to 2001, Associate Justice of that court from 1988 to 1993, and District Attorney of Santa Cruz County from 1975 to 1977. Cottle holds the unusual status of having been appointed to judgeships by both Democratic and Republican governors. He is also a former captain of the Stanford University football team.

== Education and football ==
Born in Los Angeles, Cottle grew up in nearby Inglewood, where he attended Andrew Bennett Elementary School and Morningside High School. After Cottle was placed in foster care at the age of 14, his foster parents encouraged his athleticism, and he became a three-sport athlete at Morningside, playing on the school's baseball, basketball, and football teams. He was also student body president and served as the president of the California Association of Student Body Presidents.

Cottle entered the University of California, Berkeley in 1958, but after attending for one day, he realized the school was a poor fit and transferred to Stanford University in time to start the fall quarter, as fall semester at Berkeley started one month before fall quarter at Stanford. After his transfer was approved but before classes began, he worked for the construction company building Stanford Hospital. Awarded a football scholarship, Cottle was a linebacker and center. A three-year letterman, he eventually became captain of the Stanford football team that defeated Cottle's former school (Cal) in the 1961 Big Game. He was a pre-medical student at Stanford, but during his senior year, he decided he did not want go into medicine and did not apply to medical school.

After earning his Bachelor of Arts degree in history from Stanford in June 1962, Cottle worked for the university as a fundraiser and freshman football coach. The following year, he enrolled at the University of California, Hastings College of the Law. Working his way through law school, Cottle worked as a counselor for the probation department and a janitor at Hastings, where he earned his Juris Doctor in June 1966.

== Legal career ==
Upon earning admission to the State Bar of California, Cottle worked as an attorney at the San José law firm of Berns & Steinberg until he was hired as a prosecutor by the Santa Cruz County District Attorney's office in 1968. He was assigned to prosecute sexual assault and rape cases for two years, after which he prosecuted 25 homicide cases. While he served in the District Attorney's office, Cottle taught evidence at Cabrillo College.

In 1971, he assisted District Attorney Peter A. Chang, Jr. in prosecuting John Linley Frazier, who murdered a Soquel, California family because he believed "their house was destroying the environment." In 1973, Cottle was the lead prosecutor in the case of serial killer Herbert Mullin, gaining convictions for all ten murders charged in Santa Cruz County (Mullin committed three more outside the jurisdiction).

Cottle was elected District Attorney of Santa Cruz County in 1974 and took office in 1975. He served as the county's top prosecutor until his appointment to the bench.

== Judicial career ==
Cottle resigned as District Attorney when he was appointed a Judge of the Santa Cruz County Superior Court in 1977 by Democratic Governor Jerry Brown. In 1979, Cottle ruled that the Boys Club of Santa Cruz County violated the Unruh Civil Rights Act when the club prevented girls from obtaining membership. (Eleven years later, the national Boys Clubs of America would change its name to the Boys & Girls Clubs of America.)

In 1988, the California Sixth District Court of Appeal expanded from three justices to six justices, so Republican governor George Deukmejian appointed Cottle one of the three new Associate Justices. The three new justices drew straws to determine seniority, and Cottle drew the middle straw and middle seniority.

In 1993, Republican Governor Pete Wilson elevated Cottle to Presiding Justice of the Sixth District Court of Appeal. As Presiding Justice, Cottle fostered the Court's public outreach and education programs, including programs in Santa Cruz and Monterey and at the Santa Clara University School of Law. In 1995, Cottle wrote a unanimous decision upholding the right of the San Jose Mercury News to sell posters of football star Joe Montana without Montana's permission. In 1999, a case came before the Sixth District Court of Appeal regarding a San Jose law mandating the city's government find minority-owned and women-owned firms for city contracts, and Cottle ruled that the San Jose law was unconstitutional because it violated Proposition 209.

Cottle retired from the court in 2001 and has become a private mediator and arbitrator.

Legal offices
Preceded by Walter P. Capaccioli	Presiding Justice of the California; Sixth District Court of Appeal; 1993–2001	Succeeded by Conrad L. Rushing
New office	Associate Justice of the California; Sixth District Court of Appeal; 1988–1993	Succeeded by Nathan D. Mihara
