= Christiansted Historic District =

- U.S. National Register of Historic Places
- U.S. Historic district
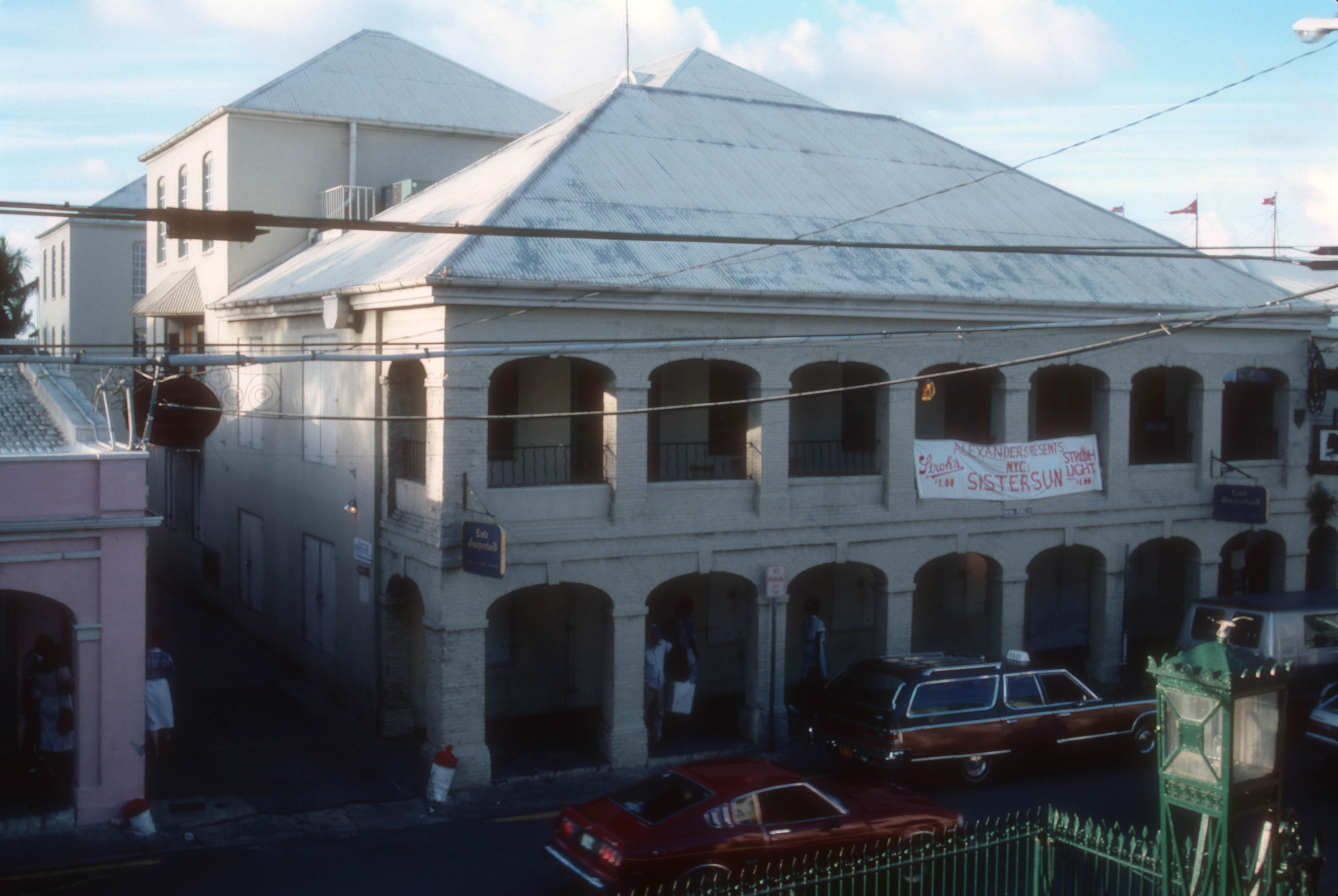

- Location within the U.S. Virgin Islands
- Location: Roughly bounded by Christiansted Harbor, New, Peter's Farm Hospital, and West Sts., Christiansted, Virgin Islands
- Coordinates: 17.746111°N 64.704444°W
- Area: 135.9 acres (55.0 ha)
- Architectural style: Renaissance Revival, Danish W. Indian vernacular
- NRHP reference No.: 76002266
- Added to NRHP: July 30, 1976

The Christiansted Historic District is a 135.9 acres (0.550 km^{2}) historic district in Christiansted, Saint Croix, Virgin Islands, which was listed on the National Register of Historic Places in 1976. It included 253 contributing buildings and two contributing sites.

It includes the Christiansted National Historic Site, also listed on the National Register. It includes Renaissance Revival and Danish West Indian vernacular architecture.

The town of Christiansted was platted in a grid pattern in 1734 by Frederik Moth, who later was the first Danish governor of St. Croix.
