= Edward Dunn (bishop) =

British Anglican bishop (1868–1955)

Edward Arthur Dunn (8 August 1868 – 11 January 1955) was an eminent Anglican bishop in the mid-20th century.

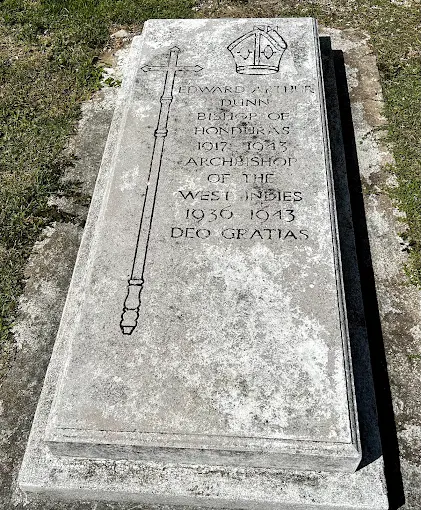
Tomb in the cemetery of St. John's Cathedral (Belize City)

== Biography ==
Dunn was born into an ecclesiastical family – his father was Andrew Hunter Dunn, at sometime the Bishop of Quebec. On 8 August, 1868, he was educated at the Marlborough and Pembroke College, Cambridge. Ordained in 1895, he was successively the Curate and then the Rector of St Paul's Quebec, Professor of Pastoral Theology at the Bishop's University, Lennoxville, and finally (before his elevation to the episcopate) the Rural Dean of Gaspe. Appointed to the post of Bishop of British Honduras in 1916, he was later elected the Archbishop of the West Indies. After retiring, he continued to take an active part in the life of his adopted country until his death on 11 January, 1955.

Anglican Communion titles
| Preceded by Walter Farrar | Bishop of British Honduras; 1916–1943 | Succeeded by James Hughes |
| Preceded by Edward Hutson | Archbishop of the West Indies; 1936–1943 | Succeeded by Arthur Anstey |
