= Cottle Church =

Anglican Church on the island of Nevis

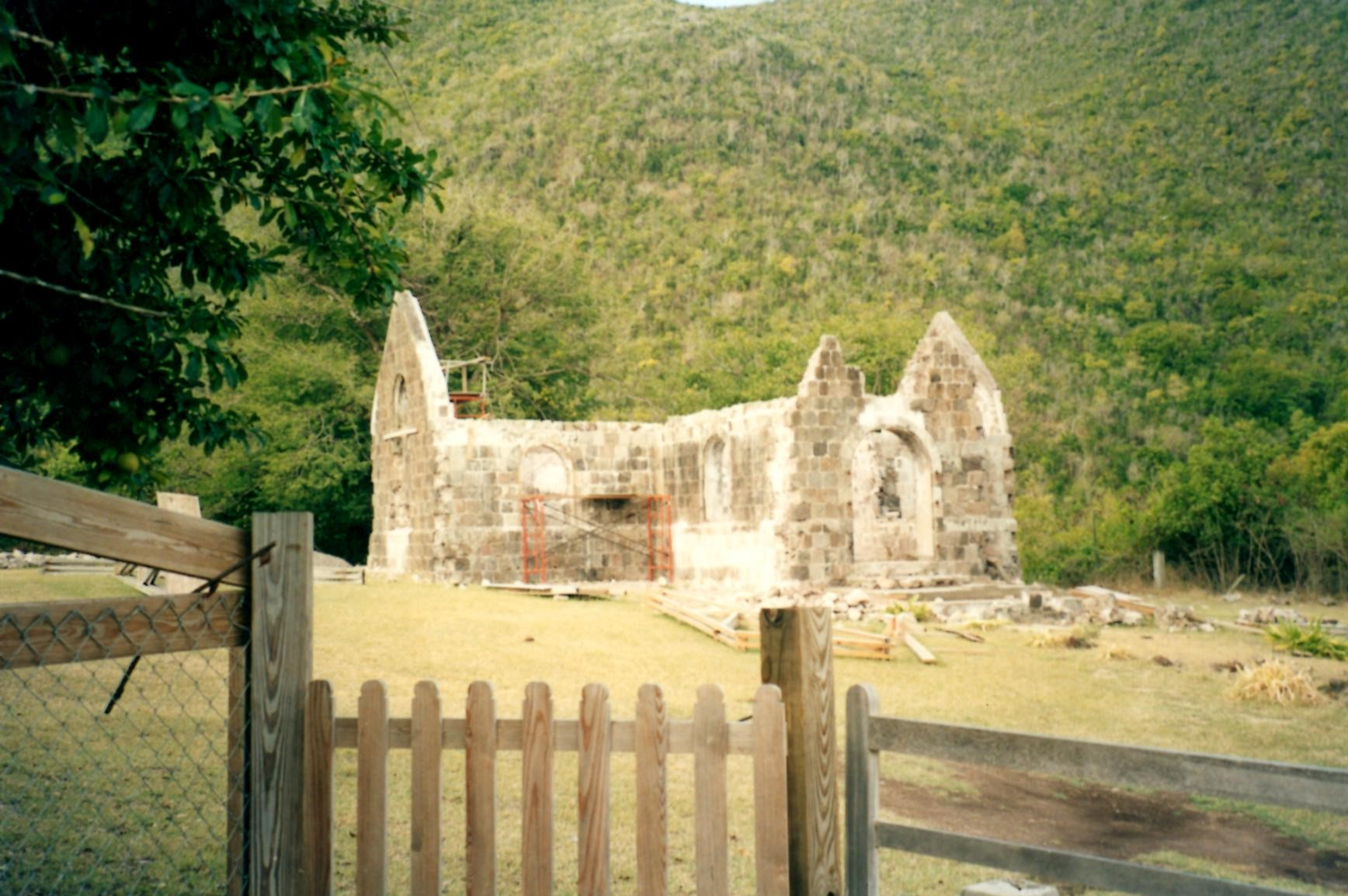

The Cottle Church was an Anglican Church on the island of Nevis. It was built at the request of Thomas Cottle, a Nevisian lawyer, by the people he had enslaved. Ground was broken in 1822 and the church was finally finished in 1824, after a severe economic depression.

The Cottle Church was opened to the public on May 5, 1824, and it was the first church on the island of Nevis which welcomed anyone to come and worship, including enslaved people.

The first Reverend of the Cottle Church was Rev. Daniel Davis. After Thomas Cottle's death in 1828, the church fell into disuse. It was then rebuilt by Governor Sir Graham Briggs in the late 19th century, but because of the population decline on the island, the Cottle Church again fell into ruins at the turn of the 20th century. Today it is now being preserved and can be seen by the public.
