= Walter Farrar =

British Anglican bishop (1865–1916)

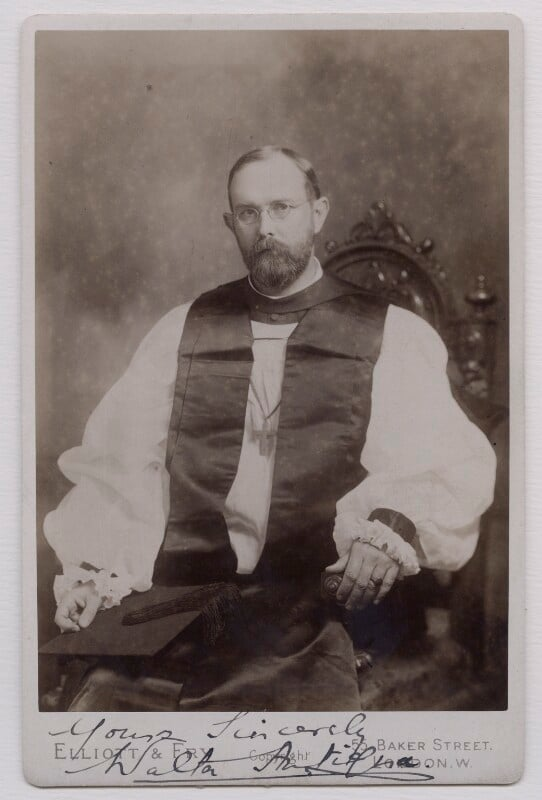
Farrar c. 1905–10

Walter Farrar (1865 – 1916) was an Anglican bishop in the first decades of the 20th century.

Farrar was educated at Queen's College, Guyana, and Keble College, Oxford, and ordained in 1888. He began his ordained ministry at St Mary's East Coast in what was then British Guiana. Later he was the rector of Hawkchurch and then acting warden of the Jamaica Church Theological College before his ordination to the episcopate as Bishop of Antigua. After some time as the Archdeacon of St Francis, Quebec, he returned to the West Indies as Bishop of British Honduras in 1913. In 1915 he became the vicar of Bognor Regis and died the following year.

Church of England titles
Preceded by Herbert Mather	Bishop of Antigua; 1905–1910	Succeeded by Edward Hutson
Preceded by Herbert Bury	Bishop of British Honduras; 1913–1915	Succeeded by Edward Arthur Dunn
