= Thomas Cottle =

Saint Kitts and Nevis lawyer

Thomas Cottle, Esq. (1761–1828) was a lawyer on the island of Nevis. In 1822, Thomas started to build a church for all people on the island, including slaves. The Cottle Church, as it is now called, was completed in 1824 and opened on May 5 that year. He married Frances Huggins, daughter of Edward Huggins, one of the richest and most powerful planters in Nevis.
