= Church in the Province of the West Indies =

Anglican Christian denomination

Church in the Province of the West Indies
- Classification: Protestant
- Orientation: Anglican
- Scripture: Holy Bible
- Theology: Anglican doctrine
- Polity: Episcopal
- Primate: Philip S. Wright
- Territory: Barbados, Belize, Guyana, Jamaica, the Cayman Islands, the Bahamas, the North-Eastern Caribbean and Aruba, Trinidad and Tobago, and the Windward Islands
- Members: 425,000
- Official website: https://cpwianglicans.org/

The Church in the Province of the West Indies is one of 42 member provinces in the worldwide Anglican Communion. The church comprises eight dioceses spread out over much of the West Indies area. The primate of the province is the Archbishop of the West Indies. The church has approximately 425,000 members. The Right Rev. Philip Wright, Anglican Bishop of Belize, was elected archbishop of the province on 10 November 2025.

== History ==
The West Indies became a self-governing province in 1883 because of the Church of England missions in territories that became British colonies. It is made up of two mainland dioceses and six island dioceses, including Barbados, Belize, Guyana, Jamaica, the Bahamas, the North-Eastern Caribbean and Aruba, Trinidad and Tobago, and the Windward Islands. Great emphasis is being placed on training personnel for an indigenous ministry. The island locations and scattered settlements make pastoral care difficult and costly.

== Ordination of Women ==
The Church in the Province of the West Indies has ordained women as deacons since 1994 and as priests since 1996. In 2019, the Synod of the church approved the ordination of women as bishops.

== Mission organisations ==
The Jamaica Church Missionary Society is the recognised missionary agency of the Diocese of Jamaica and the Cayman Islands in the Province of the West Indies. The society focuses on evangelisation with special relevance to daily human needs.

The society was established in 1861 as a subsidiary of the church, intended to target those sections of Jamaica's "hard to reach" population. For many years the mission stations established and maintained by the society provided the only means of reaching the masses of the population with Christianity and basic education.

== Theological college ==
Codrington College, an Anglican preparatory in Saint John, Barbados, opened in 1745.

== Dioceses ==
- Diocese of The Bahamas and the Turks and Caicos Islands
- Diocese of Barbados
- Diocese of Belize
- Diocese of Guyana
- Diocese of Jamaica and the Cayman Islands
- Diocese of the North East Caribbean and Aruba
- Diocese of Trinidad and Tobago
- Diocese of Windward Islands

== See also ==
- Anglican churches in the Americas
- Archbishop of the West Indies
- Caribbean Conference of Churches
