= Diocese of the North East Caribbean and Aruba =

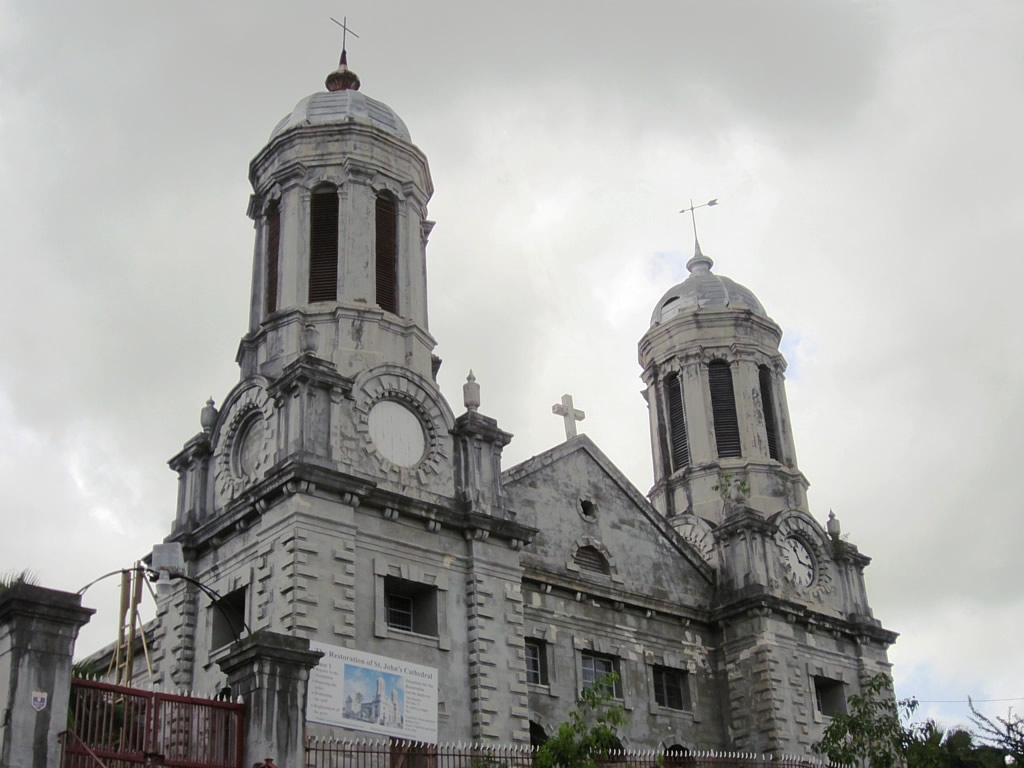
St John's Cathedral, Antigua

The Anglican Diocese of North East Caribbean and Aruba was originally established in 1842 as the Diocese of Antigua and the Leeward Islands when the Anglican Diocese of Barbados, then with the Diocese of Jamaica, one of the two dioceses covering the Caribbean, was sub-divided. In 1842 (shortly after division), her jurisdiction was described as "Montserrat, Barbuda, St Kitt's, Nevis, Anguilla, Virgin Isles, Dominica". In 2017 the diocese celebrated its 175th anniversary.

The Anglican Diocese of North East Caribbean and Aruba is one of the eight dioceses within the Province of the West Indies and comprises the twelve islands of Antigua, Barbuda, Dominica, Montserrat, Anguilla, Aruba, Nevis, Saba, St. Barts, St. Eustatius, St. Christopher, also known as St. Kitts, and St. Martin/St. Maarten. The diocesan cathedral is the Cathedral of St. John the Divine, St John's Cathedral, located on upper Newgate Street in the capital city of St John, Antigua.

Originally, the diocese was under the jurisdiction of the Archbishop of Canterbury until 1883, when the Province of the West Indies was created. As such, it was the Established Church in all British overseas territories within the Caribbean region, and therefore was primarily supported by public funds until disestablishment in 1969. The diocese remains a constituent diocese within the Anglican Province of the West Indies, which remains a constituent province within the worldwide Anglican Communion.

== Bishops ==
Arms of the Bishops of the North East Caribbean and Aruba

- 1842–1857: Daniel Davis
- 1858–1859: Stephen Rigaud
- 1860–1895: Walrond Jackson

On account of Jackson's illness and permanent return to England, coadjutor bishops were appointed to minister in the diocese:

  - 1879–1882: John Mitchinson
  - 1882–1895: Charles Branch, who automatically succeeded to the diocesan See on Jackson's death
- 1895–1896: Charles Branch
- 1897–1904: Herbert Mather (later Assistant Bishop of Hereford)
- 1905–1910: Walter Farrar
- 1911–1936: Edward Hutson (also Archbishop of the West Indies, 1922–36)
- 1937–1943: George Hand
- 1944–1952: Nathaniel Newnham Davis
- 1953–1969: Donald Knowles
- 1970–1998: Orland Lindsay (also Archbishop of the West Indies, 1986–98)
- 1998–2021: Errol Brooks
- 2022–present: Ernest Flemming

== Deans ==
- The Very Rev. Henry Young Shepherd (1906-1930)
- The Very Rev. George Sumner Hand (1930-1943)
- The Very Rev. George Stanley Baker (1943-1970)
- The Most Rev. the Hon. Dr. Orland Ugham Lindsay (1971)
- The Very Rev. Fitzroy Elderfield Pestaina (1971-1976)
- The Very Rev. Hilton Manasseh Carty (1977-1986)
- The Very Rev. William Vincent Lake (1986-2003)
- The Very Rev. James Rudolph Smithen (2003-2016)
- The Very Rev. Ernest Alroy Flemming (2016 - 2022)
- The Very Rev. Dwane Cassius (2022 - present)

== Archdeacons ==
In 1866, there were two archdeaconries: George Clarke was Archdeacon of Antigua and George Meade Gibbs of St Christopher's. At present there are three archdeaconries. The Southern Archdeaconry, which includes Antigua, Barbuda, Montserrat and Dominica. The Central Archdeaconry, which includes St. Kitts and Nevis. The Northern Archdeaconry, which includes St. Bartholomew, St. Martin/St. Maarten, Saba, St. Eustatius, Anguilla and Aruba.

- The. Venerable Peter Daley (deceased)
- The Venerable Alston Percival (retired)
- The. Venerable Valentine Hodge (retired)
- The. Venerable Franklin Reid (retired)
- The. Venerable Isaiah Phillip (Central)
- The. Venerable Terrance Rawlins (Northern)
- The. Venerable Clarence Joseph (Southern)

== Canons, Priests and Deacons ==
Canons

- Rev. Canon Emmerson Richardson (retired)
- Rev. Canon Selina Joseph (retired)
- Rev. Canon Allston Jacobs (retired)
- Rev. Canon Bernard Hodge (deceased)
- Rev. Canon John Rohim (deceased
- Rev. Canon Glenville Edwards
- Rev. Canon Reid B. Simon
- Rev. Canon Yvette Bagnall
- Rev. Canon Carlisle Vyphius

Priests:

- Rev. Fr. Allister Rawlins (retired)
- Rev. Fr. Ira Hodge (retired)
- Rev. Fr. Menes Hodge (retired)
- Rev. Fr. Sydney Jacob (retired)
- Rev. Fr. Wilfred Daniel (deceased)
- Rev. Fr. St. Clair Williams (retired)
- Rev. Fr. Spencer Skerritt (deceased)
- Rev. Fr. Victor Peters (deceased)
- Rev. Fr. Daniel Bramble (deceased)
- Rev. Fr. Christopher Archibald
- Rev. Pauline Ramsey-Burns
- Rev. Judith Archibald
- Rev. Fr. Raliville Christian
- Rev. Fr. Christopher Roberts
- Rev. Fr. Daren Carlos
- Rev. Fr. Joel St. Rose
- Rev. Fr. Thanduxolo Noketshe
- Rev. Fr. James Clarke
- Rev. Fr. Leroy Hodge

Deacons:

- Rev. George Richards
- Rev. Catherine Edwards
- Rev. Michael Irish
- Rev. Joseph Edmeade
- Rev. Hanley Browne (retired)

Seminarians:

- Mr. Leslie Scotland
