= St. John's Cathedral (Antigua and Barbuda) =

Anglican cathedral in St. John's

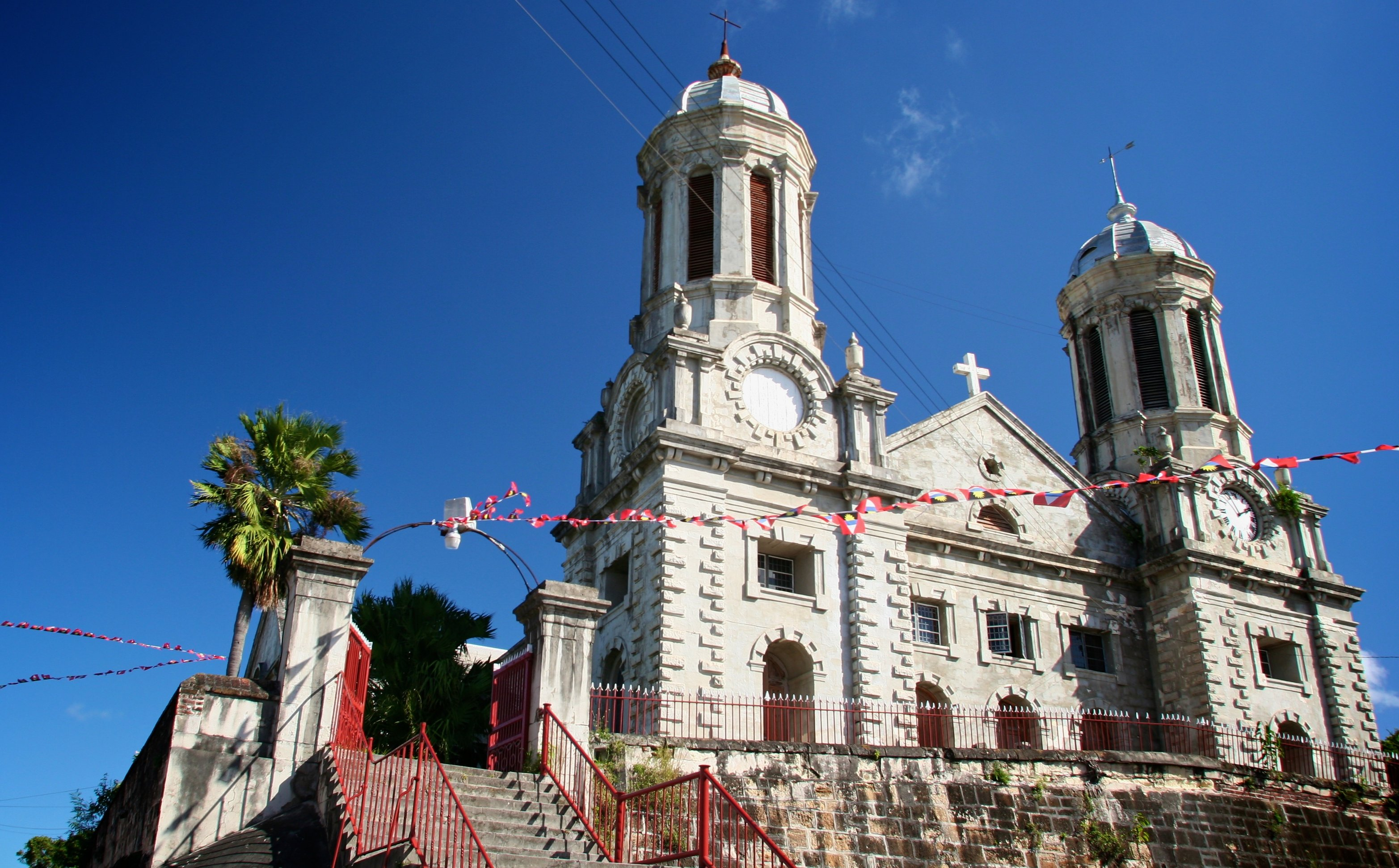
- St. John's Cathedral; St. John the Divine; Cathedral Church of the Diocese of North Eastern Caribbean and Aruba

Religion
- Affiliation: Anglican
- Province: St. John's
- Ecclesiastical or organisational status: Good
- Year consecrated: Originally consecrated in 1683, then rebuilt in 1746 and finally newly built in 1845
- Status: Anglican Church

Location
- Location: St. John's, Antigua and Barbuda
- Interactive map of St. John's Cathedral
- Coordinates: 17.1227°N 61.8419°W

Architecture
- Type: Baroque
- Style: Baroque
- Completed: 1848

Specifications
- Direction of façade: East
- Capacity: 2,200
- Length: 156 ft (48 m)
- Width: 46 ft (14 m)
- Spire: Two
- Spire height: 70 ft
- Materials: Stone

St. John's Cathedral also known as the Cathedral of St. John the Divine, the Cathedral Church of the Diocese of North Eastern Caribbean and Aruba, is an Anglican church perched on a hilltop in St. John's, Antigua and Barbuda. It is the seat of the Diocese of the North East Caribbean and Aruba in the Church in the Province of the West Indies.

The present cathedral with its imposing white twin towers was built on a fossilized reef, in 1845, and is now in its third incarnation, as earthquakes in 1683 and in 1745 destroyed the previous structures. The iron gates on the south face of the church are flanked by pillars displaying Biblical statues of St John the Divine and St John the Baptist. They were reportedly taken in 1756 from a French ship destined for Martinique.

== History ==
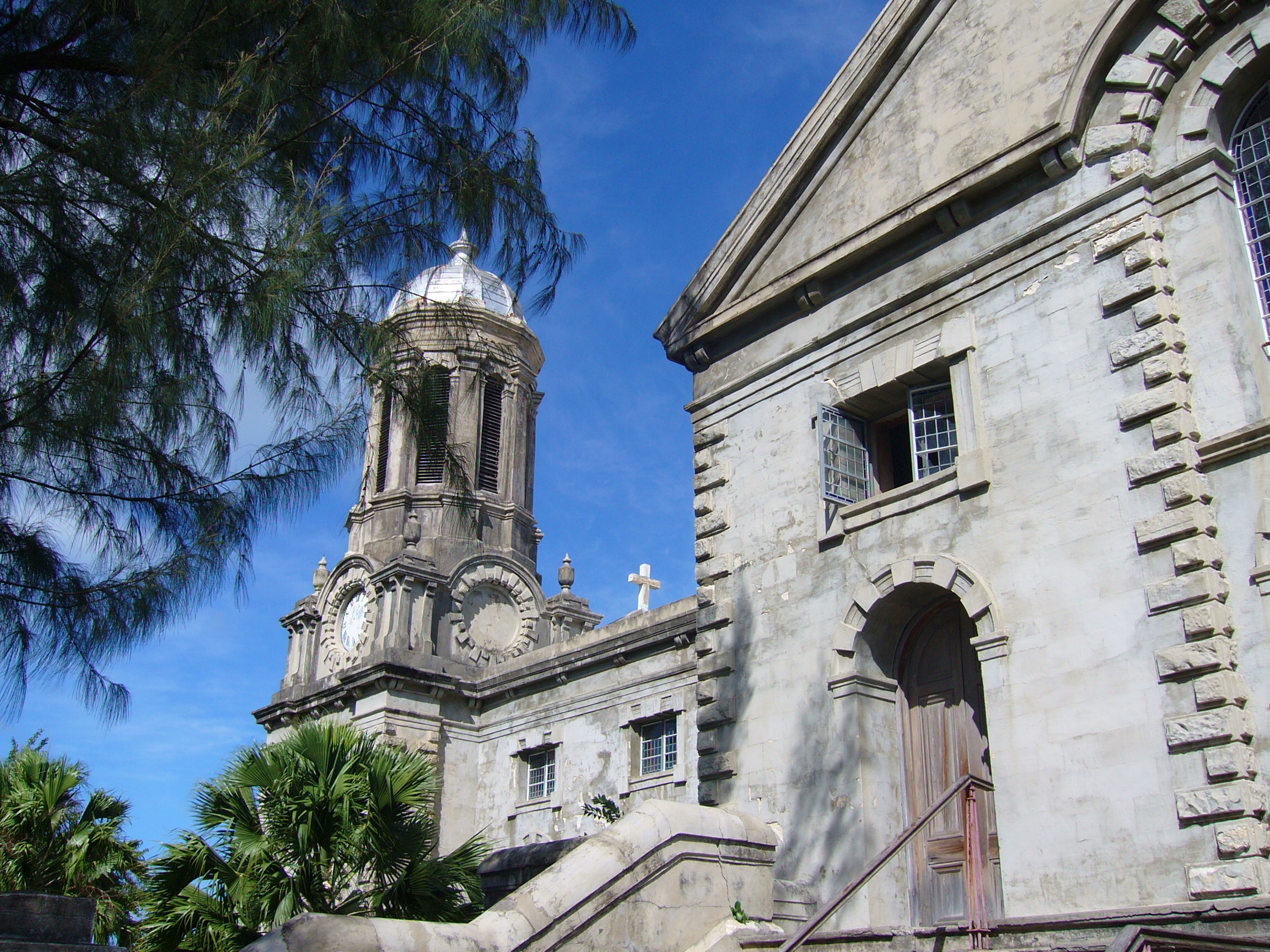
St John's Cathedral

The present church is the successor cathedral built in the same location where two other churches had existed one after the other. The first St. John's Anglican Church built here in 1681 was a simple wooden structure, devoid of any decorations. This was severely damaged in the earthquake in 1745. The second, much larger church was built in 1746 of English bricks. The architect of this church was Robert Cullen. It had a short steeple from the western end.

Nearly a century later, the Diocese of Antigua was established in 1842, and St. John's designated its cathedral. Soon thereafter, however, in February 1843, an earthquake caused serious damage to the church. The church was partially restored, and the first Bishop of Antigua, Daniel Davis.

Adjoining the old church, which was damaged, a new cathedral was planned and construction began on October 9, 1845, after Sir Charles Augustus FitzRoy, Governor of Antigua laid the foundation stone. At the end of three years of construction the new cathedral started its first divine service, with the consecration taking place on July 25, 1848. The new church was reportedly able to accommodate a congregation of 2,200.

The present history of the church has been acclaimed by a citizen of Antigua, a centenarian, in his memoirs who has said, "the planters called the Cathedral 'Big Church' and that it frightened the people as a symbol of English power. He also said that the Anglican Church catered more for the planter class, but the black people got more involved at about the time of World War I. At last some black persons’ names were memorialized on the cathedral's walls."

In 2008, it was reported that the church is in a state of disrepair and that a renovation project has been in the pipeline for several years. Also affected is the large cemetery of the church which is often used as something of a park during lunch breaks by Antiguan workers.

== Architecture ==
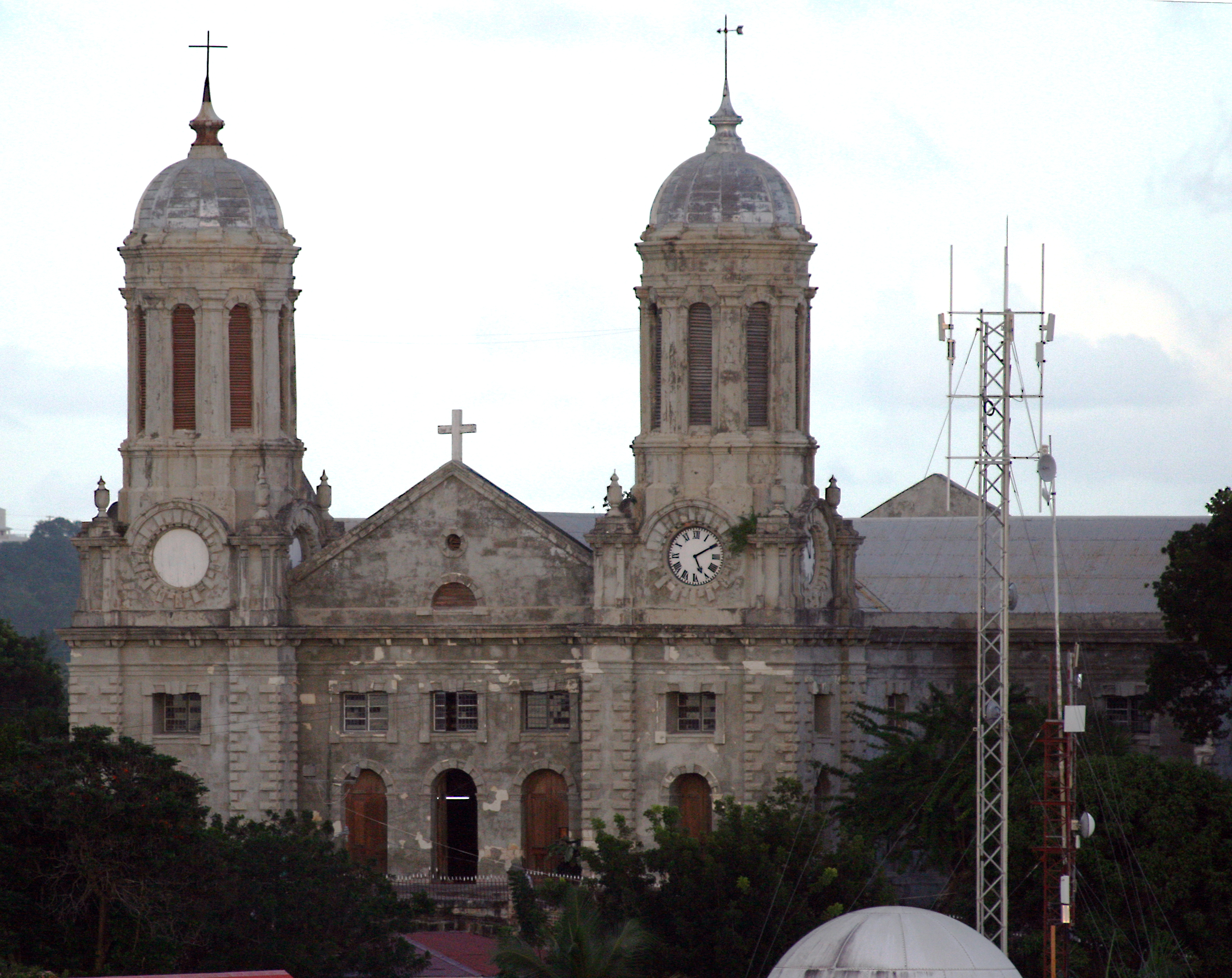
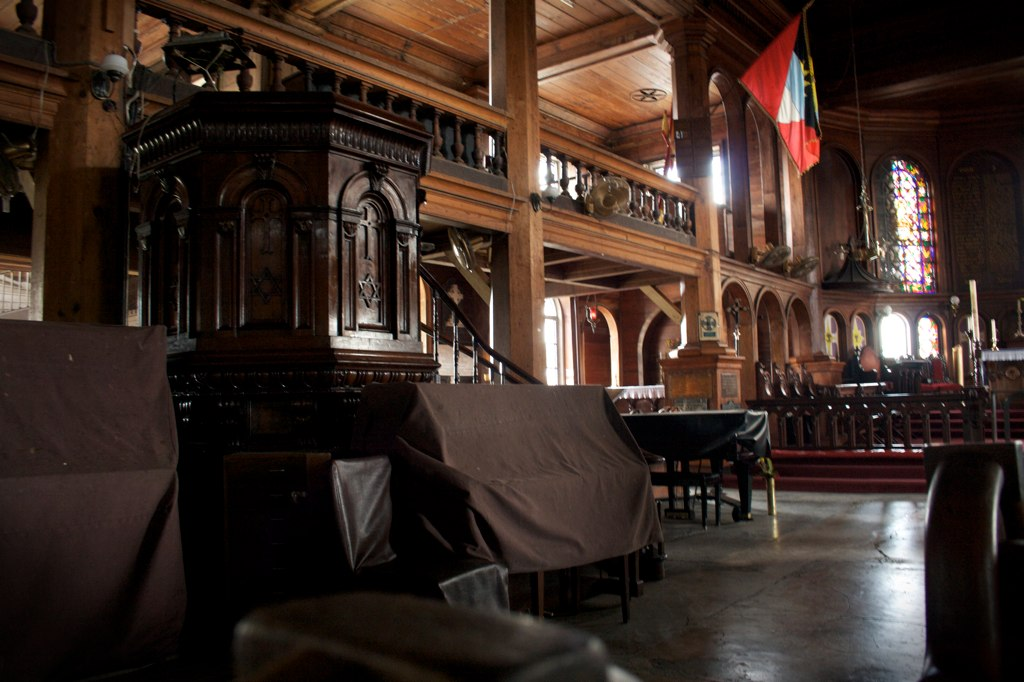
Left: Front of the church. Right: Interior

The cathedral was designed by the architect Thomas Fuller of Bath, England, and raised at the highest point in St. John's town. F.W. Rowe of Bristol was in charge of the construction. The cathedral is seen now as an impressive landmark providing a panoramic view of the island.

According to the first 1846 edition of The Church of England Magazine, the current church is 156 feet (48 m) long and 46 feet (14 m) wide. The length of the transept is 104 feet (32 m). The building is made from freestone, with stained glass windows and dark pitch pine furnishings. A unique feature in the cathedral is the pitch pine interior structure and cladding to provide lateral reinforcing for earthquake or hurricane loads. As a result that the cathedral is known by the epithet "a building within a building." The cathedral has two 70 feet (21 m) high towers built in baroque style of architecture with cupolas topping them, described as "slightly awkward," and are painted in an aluminum color. This design had invited derision when built as representing "a pagan temple with two dumpy pepper pot towers", while now it is extolled as the best cathedral in the West Indian province. The interior decor of the church is dominated by dark pine furnishings and marble tablets on the walls, some of them were salvaged after earthquakes from the old churches that stood on the spot.

The entrance iron gate from the southern side into the cathedral, which was erected in 1789, is flanked by two imposing statues, one of St John the Divine and the other of St John the Baptist in flowing robes. It is said that these statues were confiscated by the British navy from the French ship Temple in Martinique waters in 1756 during the Seven Years' War and moved to this church. At the time of erection, the edifice was criticized by ecclesiastical architects as being like "a pagan temple with two dumpy pepper pot towers", however, in more recent times the same edifice has been given the accolade as "the most imposing of all the Cathedrals of the West Indian Province."
