= Education in Barbados =

Ministry of Education, Technological and Vocational Training
- Minister of Education, Technological and Vocational Training: Hon. Kay McConney MP

National education budget (2015–16)
- Budget: BBD$489,608,238

General details
- Primary languages: English
- System type: National
- Compulsory education: 1890 (Education Act of 1890)

Literacy (2014)
- Total: 99.6
- Male: 99
- Female: 99.6

Enrollment (2015-16)
- Total: 46 812
- Primary: 20 148
- Secondary: 20 370
- Post secondary: 13 420+

Attainment
- Secondary diploma: n/a
- Post-secondary diploma: n/a
- Total enrolment includes pre-primary and special education.

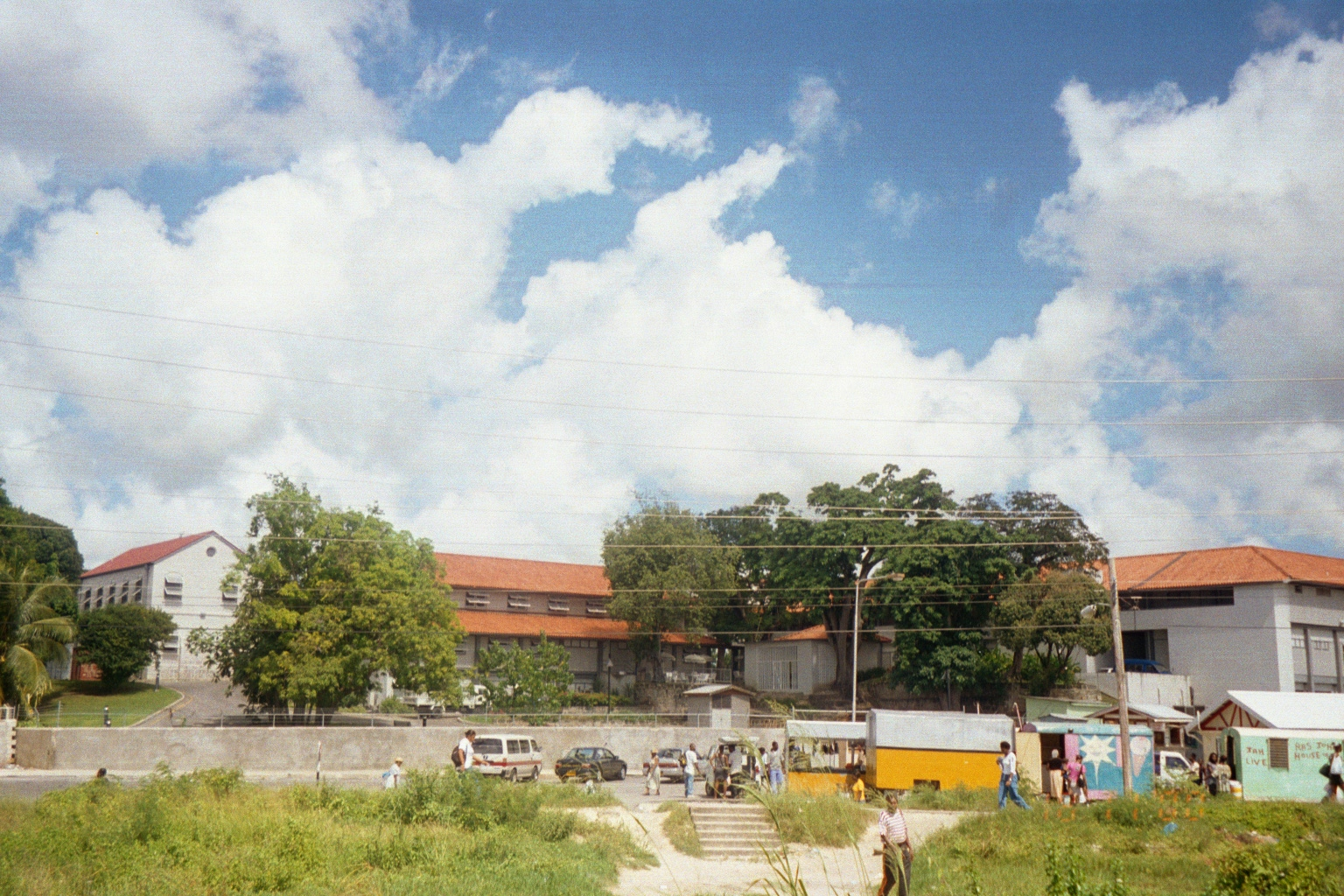
The Elsie Payne Complex at the Barbadian Ministry of Education.

Education in Barbados is based primarily on the British model. In the decades since independence most schools across the country have moved away from the Single-sex education framework and towards a more coeducational model. A number of offerings are available ranging from public or private accommodations in education to home schooling or boarding schools.

== Overview ==
Universal access to primary and secondary education dates from at least the 1960s. The literacy rate in Barbados for youth and adults are both above 99%, only falling to 98.5 among the elderly. The literacy gender parity rate is 1.0. This information is for 2014. Most schools in Barbados followed and recognized the globally accepted Cambridge International Education examinations. According to the IB there's one school in Barbados that officially recognize the IB diploma subject to certain guidelines.

== History ==
Beginning around the 1950s, many in Barbados secured the City and Guilds qualification(s) for technical education which are recognised internationally. The local associated office for the City and Guilds of London Institute, (CGLI) was situated in Belleville, St Michael. Around 1953, the Barbados Evening Institute was set up to train a number of young men in various disciplines of engineering and building construction. Following on from the Evening Institute was the establishment of the Barbados Technical Institute at Richmond Gap, St. Michael.

It was reported that Barbados has spent roughly US$15 billion on Education since Independence in 1966.

Starting in 2000, the government initiated the Education Sector Enhancement Programme, usually referred to as EduTech 2000. This US$213 million project was financed by the Government of Barbados (45%), the Inter-American Development Bank (40% and the Caribbean Development Bank (15%). This initiative provided for four key improvements: (a) repairs to 73 of the public primary and secondary school buildings; (b) new units established by the Ministry to support new teaching methodologies, including the Shell Media Resources Review Center, the National Educational Evaluation and Research Centre (at the University of the West Indies, Cave Hill), and a Programme office within the Ministry; enhancements to the technological availability (new computers, software and networking); (d) in-service training for all teachers in technology integration, child-centred methodologies, and special needs education; and (e) curricular reform to respond to changes in Barbados society. The key conceptual foundations for the initiative are constructivism and child-centred education. Most of the in-service training was provided by Erdiston Teachers' Training College.

In 2006 during the inaugural Cecil F. deCaires Memorial Lecture at the Frank Collymore Hall, the former Central Bank governor Sir Courtney Blackman remarked that between 1966 and 2000 successive Governments (of Barbados) had spent US$15 billion on education costs – "a remarkable investment for such a small state".

In 2009, Ronald Jones as the Minister of Education and Human Resource Development said the Barbados government spent $290 million to upgrade the schools with information technology. Given this Jones said the ministry would be entering a grading processes for schools on their usage of the technology using a scale of 1 to 6.

== Governance ==
Education in Barbados is governed under Laws of Barbados, CAP. 41 the Education Act (dated 1st March 1982).

In Barbados there is a Minister of Education who acts like a Superintendent of Schools. The country additionally has an Accreditation Council (BAC). which is a statutory body as empowered under Chapter 38A of the laws of Barbados. The actual body was operational from 2006, The council further contains within it a board of directors. BAC is a member of The International Network for Quality Assurance Agencies in Higher Education, and it is recognized by the Council for Higher Education Accreditation. The council is under proposal to be renamed the Barbados Accreditation Authority.

Vocational accreditation is handled by the Barbados Technical and Vocational Education and Training (TVET) Council.

=== Structure ===
- Nursery education (From 3.5 years of age)
- Primary education (From 4 years of age – 11 years)
  - At 11 students sit the Barbados Secondary School Entrance Examination (BSSEE) to aid in transition to secondary school.
- Secondary education (From 11 years of – 18 years)
  - At age 16, students write the Caribbean Examination Council (CXC) examinations Caribbean Secondary Entrance Certificate (CSEC) - the equivalent of GCE O-Levels. At about age 18, those students who continue at school can sit the CXC- Caribbean Advanced Proficiency Certificate (A-Level).
- Tertiary education

=== School Year ===
The Barbadian school year is fashioned after the British system, and as such, it follows a scheduling with three terms per school year.

The first term begins the second week of September and continues for 15 weeks adjourning in mid-December excluding one week for Mid Term Break in Mid-October. The second Term begins in the first week of January and continues for 12 weeks ending the end of March. The final Third Term begins mid-April and continues for 11 weeks until the end of June.

The School Holiday period is 9 to 10 weeks long from the end of June until the first week of September.

Education is provided free of charge and is compulsory between the ages of 5 and 16, and attendance is strictly enforced. In 1991, the gross primary enrollment rate was 90.4 percent.

== Institutions ==
As of 2015–16, there are:

- 10 public nursery schools,
- 14 private nursery schools,
- 68 public primary schools (of which 67 offer pre-primary education),
- 26 private primary/mixed schools,
- 3 public special needs schools (and 4 public primary schools with special needs services),
- 4 private special needs schools,
- 22 public secondary schools (of which nine offer sixth form),
- 9 private secondary/mixed schools

5 tertiary- or vocational-level institutions

- UWI Cave Hill
- Barbados Community College (BCC)
- The Samuel Jackman Prescod Institute of Technology (SJPI)
- Codrington College
- Erdiston Teachers' Training College
- American University of Barbados

1 central administrative agency, Ministry of Education, Technological and Vocational Training, including inter alia

- Media Resources Department
- Higher Education Development Unit
- Education Project Implementation Unit

== Scholarships ==
More well known scholarships offered to Barbadians include:

- Barbados Canada Foundation
- Chevening Scholarship
- The Duke of Edinburgh's Award
- The Japan Exchange & Teaching (JET) Programme
- The National Development Scholarship
- Rhodes Scholarships

== See also ==
- Demographics of Barbados
- Ministry of Education
- Commonwealth of Learning
- Council of International Schools
- International Standard Classification of Education
- National Library Service of Barbados
- School uniforms
