= University of the West Indies at Cave Hill =

Education organization in Cave Hill, Saint Michael, Barbados

Coordinates: 13.134013°N 59.630088°W

The University of the West Indies at Cave Hill
- Motto: Oriens Ex Occidente Lux (Latin)
- Motto in English: "A Light Rising from the West"
- Type: Regional, public, autonomous
- Established: 1963; 63 years ago
- Affiliations: Association of Commonwealth Universities (ACU); Caribbean Community; Association of Atlantic Universities
- Chancellor: Dodridge D Miller
- Vice-Chancellor: Sir Hilary Beckles
- Principal: Professor R Clive Landis
- Students: 6,668
- Undergraduates: 5,655
- Postgraduates: 1,013
- Location: Bridgetown, Barbados
- Campus: Cave Hill, Barbados 98.12 acres (39.71 ha)
Colors
- Mascot: The Blackbird
- Website: cavehill.uwi.edu

The University of the West Indies at Cave Hill is a public research university in Cave Hill, Barbados. It is one of five general campuses in the University of the West Indies system.

It was the third campus to be established by the UWI System, following the Mona campus in Jamaica and the St. Augustine campus in Trinidad and Tobago. The Cave Hill campus is also the headquarters of the Open Campus, which is responsible for UWI programmes in the non-campus territories. The University of the West Indies, Cave Hill Campus' academic programmes offer diversity at both the undergraduate and graduate level. There are seven faculties with supporting academic departments; various research units and centres; and two graduate institutions. Codrington College, the oldest educational institution in the Caribbean, is affiliated with Cave Hill, while the School of Education works with Erdiston Teachers' Training College to provide pre-service and in-service training to teachers in Barbados and other parts of the Caribbean. Since 2004, the Cave Hill campus is the site of the West Indies Federal Archives Centre.

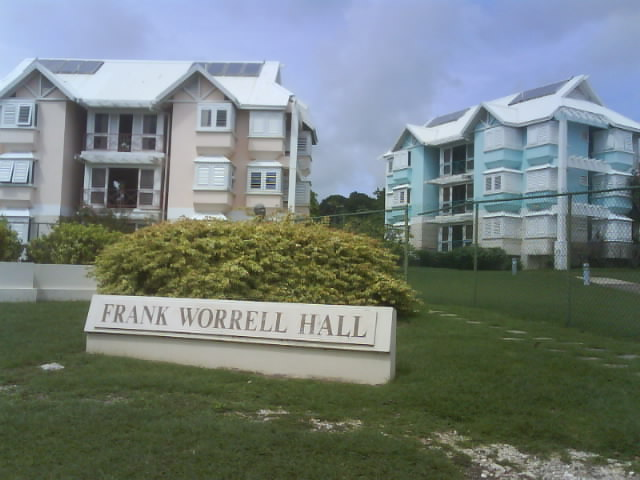
Dormitories at the Cave Hill Campus of the University of the West Indies.

== History ==
The university was founded in 1948, on the recommendation of the Asquith Commission on Higher Education in the Colonies, through its sub-committee on the West Indies chaired by Sir James Irvine. The Asquith Commission had been established in 1943 to review the provision of higher education in the British colonies. Initially in a special relationship with the University of London, the then University College of the West Indies (UCWI) was seated at Mona, about five miles from Kingston, Jamaica.

The University College achieved independent university status in 1962. The St Augustine Campus in Trinidad, formerly the Imperial College of Tropical Agriculture (ICTA), was established in 1960.

Sir Arthur Lewis, then Vice-Chancellor of the independent UWI, wanted to expand the university beyond Jamaica and Trinidad and Tobago to serve the "little eight" - the eastern Caribbean islands. The "little eight" comprised Grenada, Dominica, St. Kitts, and Nevis, Antigua and Barbuda, St. Lucia, St. Vincent and the Grenadines, and Montserrat. These islands, smaller than either Jamaica or Trinidad and Tobago, had been members of the West Indies Federation but upon its dissolution, were isolated and in need of regional support. A proposal was developed and submitted in February 1963 to the University Council for a campus in Barbados. It was approved and was initially housed in a site near the Bridgetown Harbour. The Campus opened just over half a year later with 118 students. It subsequently moved to Cave Hill, its present location, in 1967. Initially, it was called the College of Arts and Sciences and received significant support from the Government of Barbados in the form of free university education for its citizens.

== Enrolment, graduation and research data ==
According to the 2015/2016 Cave Hill Campus Annual Report to Council, on 29 November 2016, there were 5,507 students on the Cave Hill Campus. This represented a 9 per cent decline from the previous year, largely due to a change in policy by the Government of Barbados resulting in students having to pay university tuition fees. Previously, Bajan students only had to pay limited charges. The Faculty of Social Studies had the largest enrolment, followed by the Faculty of Sciences and Technology, the Faculty of Law and the Faculty of Medical Sciences and finally the Faculty of Humanities and Education. Graduate studies comprised 703 students.

In the 2015/16 academic year, 1,216 undergraduate degrees were awarded, along with 473 postgraduate credentials (including doctorates, master's degrees and advanced diplomas) for a grand total of 1,689 awards.

During the 2015/16 academic year, BD$268,402.79 was awarded by the Campus to postgraduate students for conference attendance and research. In the same year, BD$316,974 was provided to faculty members for research and attending conferences. Cave Hill faculty members published 11 books, 42 book chapters, 30 technical reports and 137 journal articles during this time.

== Campus ==
The original, temporary campus, then known as the College of Arts and Science, was located at the Trade Fair site, at the Deep Water Harbour. The permanent campus was established in Cave Hill (from which the campus takes its name), St. Michael, with the foundation stone laid on 26 January 1966. The campus was designed by Captain William Tomlin and consists of a total of 39.7 ha. 17 ha overlooks the city of Bridgetown, while a further 13 ha of adjacent land is situated with a view of the Caribbean Sea.

The campus has two other off-campus sites in progress. One is the Dukes Lands in the parish of St. Thomas. Activities at the Dukes Lands include training in various areas of agro-business, such as producing leather goods and manufacturing chocolate, research and support for entrepreneurial initiatives.

A second is an incubator for digital entrepreneurship in Bridgetown. It occupies the Mutual Building, the former headquarters of Sagicor Financial Corporation, from which UWI leased the building.

Other suggestions for a further satellite campus within Barbados have included moving or establishing a portion back to Bridgetown.

== Faculties ==
- Culture, Creative & Performing Arts
- Humanities and Education
- Law
- Medical Sciences
- Science and Technology
- Social Sciences
- Sport

=== Accreditation ===
In 2019, UWI Cave Hill (as a whole) was re-accredited by the Barbados Accreditation Council for the maximum term, ending in 2026. The three UWI medical schools are accredited together, despite differences in curriculum, and are currently accredited with conditions by the Caribbean Accreditation Authority for Education in Medicine and other Health Professions (CAAM-HP).

== Faculty of Culture, Creative and Performing Arts ==
=== Departments ===
- Department of Cultural Studies
- Department of Creative and Performing Arts (formerly Errol Barrow Centre for Creative Imagination)

== Faculty of Humanities and Education ==
=== Departments ===
- School of Education
- Department of History and Philosophy
- Department of Language, Linguistics & Literature

=== Specialised units and centres ===
- Centre for Caribbean Lexicography
- Centre for Language Learning Centre

=== Affiliated colleges ===
- Codrington College
- Erdiston Teachers' Training College

== Faculty of Law ==
=== Specialised units and centres ===
- Caribbean Law Institute Centre (CLIC), twinned with the Florida State University Caribbean Law Institute

== Faculty of Medical Sciences ==
=== Specialised units and centres ===
- George Alleyne Chronic Disease Research Centre

== Faculty of Science and Technology ==
=== Departments ===
- Department of Biological & Chemical Sciences
- Department of Computer Science, Mathematics and Physics

=== Specialised units and centres ===
- Centre for Resource Management & Environmental Studies (CERMES)

=== Affiliated centres ===
- Caribbean Institute for Meteorology and Hydrology

== Faculty of Social Sciences ==
=== Departments ===
- Department of Economics
- Department of Government, Sociology, Social Work & Psychology
- Department of Management Studies

=== Academic units and centres ===
- Shridath Ramphal Centre - International Trade Law, Policy and Services
- CLR James Cricket Research Centre
- Sagicor Cave Hill School of Business and Management

=== Affiliated research units and centres ===
- Institute for Gender and Development Studies - Nita Barrow Unit
- Sir Arthur Lewis Institute of Social & Economic Studies (SALISES)

== Student life ==
The Cave Hill Academy of Sport, now a unit of the new Faculty of Sport, provides a range of sporting activities for participants, nicknamed the UWI Blackbirds. There are many clubs and associations at the university, divided into categories such as: cultural, academic, religious and service.

The Cavite Chorale is a student organisation managed under the Guild of Students. This Caribbean singing group was started in 1973 by Kean H. W. Springer (BA, Dip.Ed, M.Phil) as director. It is quartered at the Cave Hill Campus of the University of the West Indies in Barbados. Cavite Chorale has performed with the Mighty Gabby and Eddy Grant.

== Campus principals and pro vice-chancellors ==
- Mr Leslie R. B. Robinson, founding principal of the College of Arts and Science
- Sir Sidney Lancelot Martin (1964–1983)
- Sir Woodville Marshall
- Sir Keith Hunte (1983–2002)
- Professor Sir Hilary Beckles (2002–2015), currently UWI vice-chancellor
- Eudine Barriteau (2015–2021)
- Professor R. Clive Landis (2021–present)

== Notable alumni ==
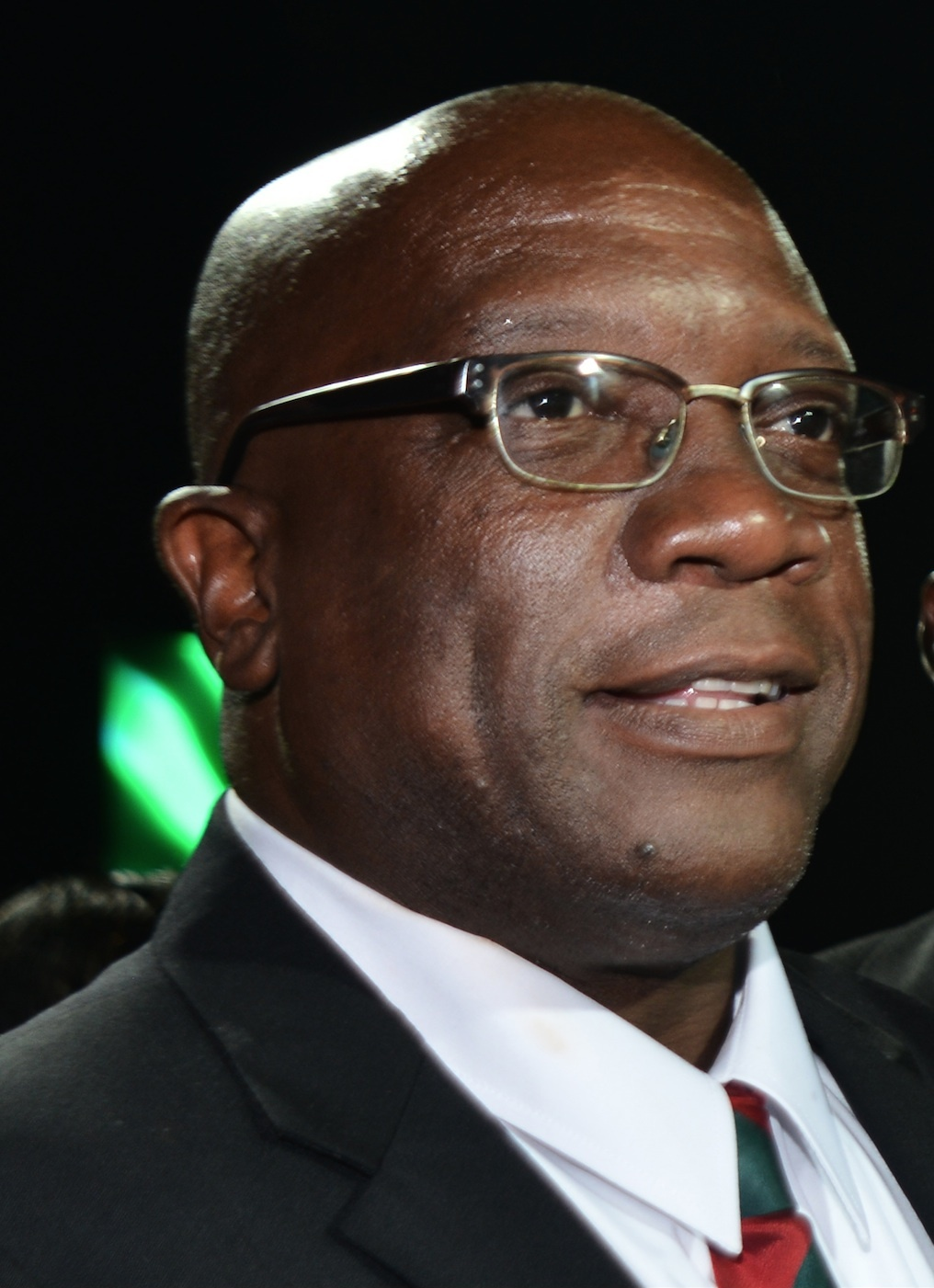
Prime Minister Timothy Harris studied at the University of the West Indies, Cave Hill Campus

- Sandra Mason, first and current President of Barbados
- Paula-Mae Weekes, former President of Trinidad and Tobago
- Kamla Persad-Bissessar, former Prime Minister and current Leader of the Opposition of Trinidad and Tobago
- Timothy Harris, former Prime Minister of Saint Kitts and Nevis
- Keith Mitchell, current Prime Minister of Grenada
- Owen Arthur, former Prime Minister of Barbados
- Denzil Douglas, former Prime Minister of Saint Kitts and Nevis
- Freundel Stuart, former Prime Minister of Barbados
- David Thompson, former Prime Minister of Barbados
- Kenny Anthony, former Prime Minister of Saint Lucia
- Tracy Davidson-Celestine, former political leader of the Tobago Council of the People's National Movement and former Trinidad and Tobago Ambassador to Costa Rica
- Marion Vernese Williams, former Governor of the Central Bank of Barbados
- John Holder, former Anglican Archbishop of the West Indies
- Adrian Saunders, President of the Caribbean Court of Justice
- DeLisle Worrell, former Governor of the Central Bank of Barbados
- Mia Mottley, current Prime Minister of Barbados
- Alison Hinds, female British-Barbadian soca singer

== See also ==
- University of the West Indies
- Barbados Community College
- Samuel Jackman Prescod Institute of Technology
- Codrington College
- Erdiston Teachers' Training College
