= List of permanent representatives of Barbados to the United Nations in Geneva =

The Barbadian permanent representative to the United Nations and Other International Organisations in Geneva is Barbados's permanent representative to the United Nations Office at Geneva and other international organizations based in Geneva, Switzerland. This includes the World Trade Organization, the International Organization for Migration, the International Committee of the Red Cross, and other non-governmental organizations. Permanent representatives normally hold the personal rank of ambassador.

== List of permanent representatives ==
- 2010–2016: Dr. Marion Vernese Williams
- 2016–2018: Bentley DeVere Gibbs
- 2018–2022: Chad Blackman
- 2022–present: Matthew Wilson
