= DeLisle Worrell =

Dr. DeLisle Worrell
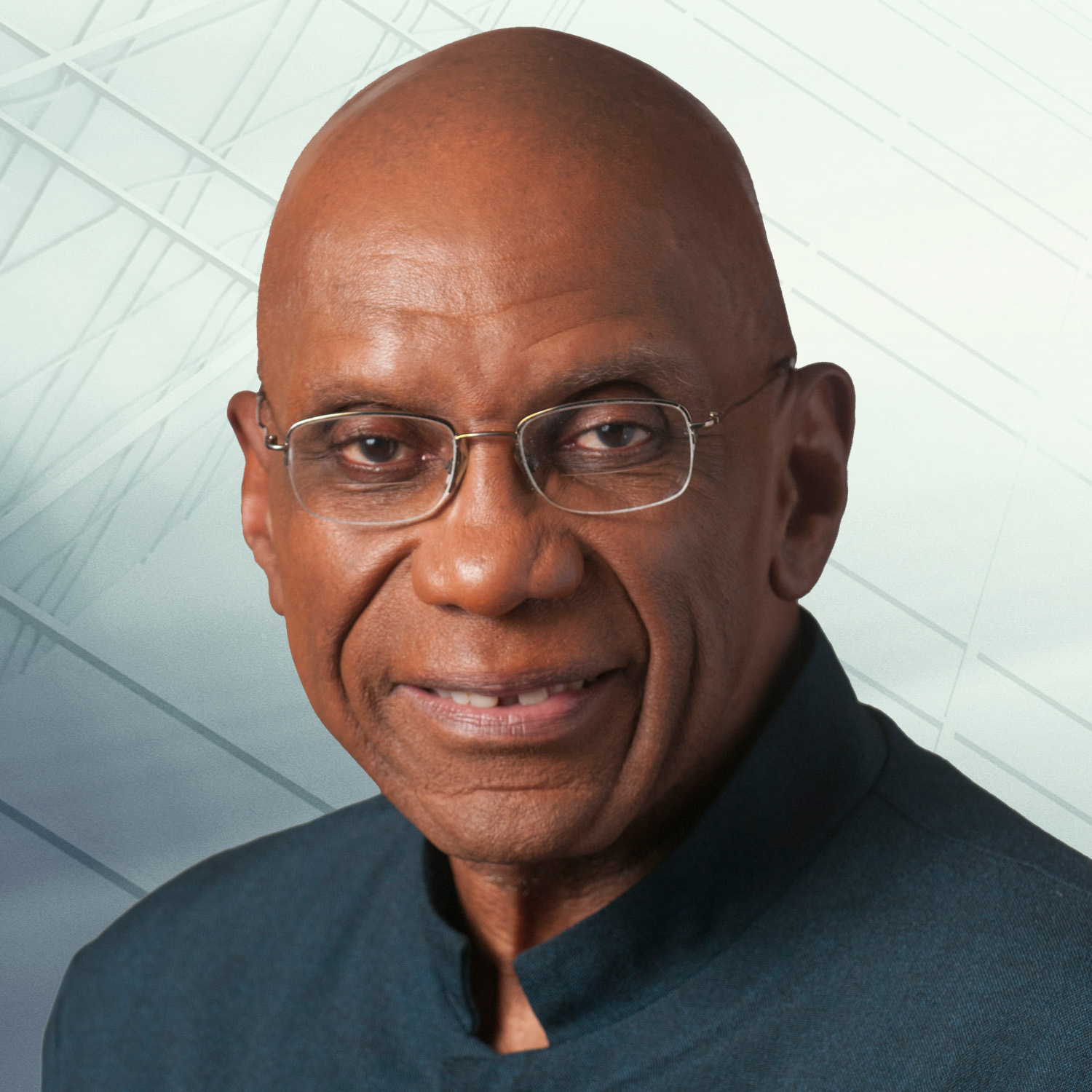

Governor of the Central Bank of Barbados
- In office November 2009 – March 2017
- Prime Minister: David Thompson
- Preceded by: Marion Vernese Williams
- Succeeded by: Cleviston Haynes

Personal details
- Born: 1945 (age 80–81) Colony of Barbados
- Spouse: Monica Drayton
- Education: University of the West Indies (BS), McGill University (MA, PhD)
- Occupation: President, DeLisle & Associates, Member of the Financial Policy Council, Bermuda Monetary Authority
- Profession: Economist
- Fields: Economic modeling and forecasting (econometrics)

Dr. DeLisle Worrell is a former Governor of the Central Bank of Barbados. He served as Governor from November 2009 until March 2017. He has also served as executive director of the Caribbean Centre for Money and Finance (CCMF). Since June 2018, he is a member of the Financial Policy Council of the Bermuda Monetary Authority.

== Early life and education ==
Worrell was born in Barbados, then a British colony, in 1945. He is married to Monica Drayton.

He completed his Bachelor of Science (BS) degree in economics from the University of the West Indies in 1967. He then proceeded to Canada for graduate work. He holds a Master of Arts (MA) and a Ph.D (1975), both in economics, from McGill University, where he trained as an econometrician. He has held fellowships at Yale University, Princeton University, the Smithsonian Institution, and the University of the West Indies.

== Professional career ==
Before and after his graduate schooling at McGill University, Worrell worked as an economist at the Central Bank of Barbados from 1973 to 1998, during which time he founded its Research Department. He rose to become the bank's deputy governor from 1988 to 1998, with responsibilities for research, management information systems, and banking supervision. As deputy governor during the 1991 economic crisis in Barbados, he helped the government of Prime Minister Erskine Sandiford formulate a monetary strategy to bring the country out of the crisis.

After completing two terms as deputy governor, Worrell worked at the International Monetary Fund (IMF) from 1998 to 2008. As IMF technical adviser, his work focused on monetary policy, financial stability, and stress testing in countries in Europe, Asia, Africa and the Caribbean. From 2008 until 2009, he served as the executive director of the Caribbean Centre for Money and Finance (CCMF).

== Appointment as Central Bank governor ==
In November 2009, Barbadian Prime Minister David Thompson recruited Worrell back into the Central Bank of Barbados and promptly appointed him to its top leadership. He served two terms as the bank's governor, first from 2009 to 2014. In 2014, he was reappointed to a second term by Prime Minister Freundel Stuart.

In March 2017, he was removed from the post, as a result of disagreement with Finance Minister Chris Sinckler and the board of the Central Bank of Barbados. Worrell, through his counsel, appealed the dismissal by Sinckler before the Barbadian Court of Appeal. The appeal was denied with finality in March 2017, thereby ending his shorter, second term as bank governor. Deputy bank governor Cleviston Haynes took over as acting governor. He eventually succeeded Worrell as full-fledged governor in July 2017.

== Other positions ==
After leaving the Bank, Worrell founded and became president of his consulting firm, DeLisle Worrell & Associates, which specializes in economic modeling and forecasting. In June 2018, he was appointed a Member of the Financial Policy Council of the Bermuda Monetary Authority, a post which he continues to hold. He also continues to be a member of the prominent Bretton Woods Committee, a network of prominent global citizens which works to demonstrate the value of international cooperation and to foster strong, effective Bretton Woods institutions.

More recently, he co-chaired the Financial Stability Board's Regional Consultative Group, Americas (RCG-A), alongside Carolyn Wilkins, senior deputy governor of the Central Bank of Barbados .

A prolific writer and speaker, Worrell is the author of Policies for Stabilization and Growth in Small Very Open Economies (Group of Thirty, Washington D C, 2012) and Small Island Economies (Praeger Publishers, 1987). His other publications on money and banking, exchange rate policy and the balance of payments, fiscal policy, the economic implications of size, and the comparative economic performance of Caribbean and South Pacific economies, may be found on the websites of the IMF, the Central Bank of Barbados, the Caribbean Centre for Money and Finance, and the juried economic journals in which he has extensively published.

== Major publications ==
- Small Island Economies: Structure and Performance in the English Speaking Caribbean since 1970 (New York: Praeger Publishers, 1987)
- Policies for Stabilization and Growth in Small Very Open Economies (Group of Thirty, Washington DC, 2012)
- The Economy of Barbados, 1946-1980 (Bridgetown, Barbados, The Central Bank of Barbados, 1982)
- Development and Stabilization in Small Open Economies: Theories and Evidence from Caribbean Experience (Routledge, 2023)
