= Joseph Hennis =

Archdeacon of Antigua (1968-1971)

- Born: Joseph Gabriel Lake Hennis; August 26, 1930 (age 94); Anguilla
- Occupation: Priest
- Years active: 1958–2019
- Spouse: Thelma Elaine Prescod (m. 1959)
- Children: 6

The Rev. Canon Joseph Gabriel Lake Hennis was Archdeacon of Antigua from 1968 until 1971.

Joseph Hennis was born in Anguilla, educated at Codrington College, and ordained as a priest on December 14, 1958. As such, he became the first Anguillan to be ordained to the Anglican ministry. He was Curate at St Anthony, Montserrat then held incumbencies at St George, Montserrat; All Saints, Antigua; and St Mary's, Barbados. Canon Hennis studied at Huron College, Canada in 1963 and he worked at St Barnabas Church, Toronto, Canada in 1964.
