= Samuel Jackman Prescod Institute of Technology =

Tertiary school in Pine Hill, Bridgetown, Barbados

Coordinates: 13.09566°N 59.57835°W

- Motto in English: "Enter work with skills"
- Type: Technical and Vocational Training Institution
- Established: 1969
- Parent institution: Ministry of Education, Technological and Vocational Training
- Chairman: Mrs. Coreen Kennedy-Taitt
- Principal: Mr. Ian Drakes
- Academic staff: 90+
- Administrative staff: 90+
- Students: 2495
- Location: Saint Michael, Barbados
- Campus: Urban
- Website: http://sjpi.edu.bb/

The Samuel Jackman Prescod Institute of Technology is a technical and vocational educational institution located in Pine Hill, Bridgetown, Barbados.

== History ==
The Samuel Jackman Prescod Institute of Technology (SJPI) laid its foundation in 1969 at the SJP Polytechnic. The institute's building is located near University Row, Deep Water Harbour, in Bridgetown. In 1972, the Barbados Technical Institute further merged with the Polytechnic branches, in Richmond and Grazettes Industrial Park.

The school continued to unveil better prospects, and in 1975, it further expanded to emphasize technical and vocational training. The institute's original title was Samuel Jackman Prescod Polytechnic (SJPP) and was renamed on October 19, 2017.

== Courses ==
SJPI offers various programs and providing certificates of completion or diplomas:

- Agriculture (including crop husbandry, animal husbandry, and landscaping & horticulture)
- Automotive and Welding Engineering (including welding, auto-body repair, maritime operations, motor vehicle engineering, and small engine repair)
- Building Studies (including carpentry & joinery, masonry, plumbing, painting & decorating, and cabinet & furniture making)
- Business Studies (including accounting and office administration)
- Electrical Engineering (including electronics servicing, electrical installation, refrigeration & air conditioning, microcomputers, and network technologies)
- General Studies
- Human Ecology (including nursing auxiliary, catering, cosmetology, aesthetics, garment technology, hairdressing, beauty therapy, and home economics)
- Mechanical Engineering and Printing (including mechanical maintenance, and graphic design & print)

Students study full-time or part-time through distance learning or continuing education. SJPI first considered distance learning options in the early 2000s, having already established four continuing education centers at existing schools.

Approximately 3,000 people apply annually to SJPI, which accepts roughly 50%. Capacity constraints, may force applicants to be turned away even if they meet admissions standards. Many applicants are nationals of other Caribbean countries and from around the world, some from as far away as Namibia.

During the 2015–2016 academic year, SJPP enrolled 1,644 males and 851 females, for a total of 2,495 students.

SJPI is registered, but not accredited, by the Barbados Accreditation Council.

== University College of Barbados proposal ==
In 2002, the government of Barbados announced that it intended to merge the Barbados Community College with the then-named Samuel Jackman Prescod Polytechnic and the Erdiston Teachers' Training College to form the new University College of Barbados. A major cause for this proposal was capacity issues among the three institutions. In the 2000–2001 academic year, 13,282 people applied to the three institutions. Only 4,504 were accepted.

A project team from the Ministry of Education led to a proposal for the unification. The business plan indicated that the merger would increase access, respond in a proactive manner to the demand for existing programs, improve obsolete and deteriorating facilities, and upgrade programs, curricula and services. The following table shows the enrollment and annual budget (2003):

Institution	Student Enrollment	Annual Budget (BBD)
Barbados Community College	3,697	$33,457,283
Samuel Jackman Prescod Institute of Technology	2,972	$13,360,740
Erdiston Teachers' Training College	223	$3,784,367

The concept of merging the institutions resembles initiatives in other West Indian countries. Other examples include Antigua State College, which merged a teachers' college and a community college; Dominica State College, which merged a Sixth form college, a teachers' training college and a nursing institute; and the Sir Arthur Lewis Community College, which merged the pre-existing teachers' college. As a multi-disciplinary community college, the Barbados Community is unusual in not having developed from merging predecessor institutions.

The general election of 2008 led to a change in government. The merger was delayed while emphasis was placed on sharing services. The project team was converted into the Higher Education Development Unit, which was mandated to develop shared resources in the areas of accounting, student information systems, library services, and online learning.

The amalgamation of the three institutions has been revisited in 2024 as part of the Barbados government's education transformation process. The institutions are working assiduously to bring the project to fruition.

== See also ==
- University of the West Indies, Cave Hill Campus
- Codrington College
- Barbados Community College
- Erdiston Teachers' Training College
- American University of Barbados
