= Frederick Streetly =

Frederick James Fairland Streetly, OBE (1893–1952) was an Anglican priest in Trinidad and Tobago.

Streetly was educated at Codrington College, Barbados and the University of Durham and ordained in 1916. After a curacy at Scarborough he was Rector of St Agnes, Port of Spain from 1932 to 1940; and then of St Paul, San Fernando until 1947. He was a founder of technical education in Trinidad and Tobago. He was Archdeacon of Trinidad South from 1942 to 1947; and then of Tobago from 1947.

He died in March 1952.
