= Courtney Blackman =

Governor of the Central Bank of Barbados (1933–2021)

Courtney Blackman KA

1st Governor of the Central Bank of Barbados
- In office 1972–1987
- Preceded by: position established
- Succeeded by: Kurleigh King

Personal details
- Born: Courtney Newlands McLaurin Blackman; 6 March 1933 Barbados, British Windward Islands
- Died: 16 March 2021 (aged 88) Orlando, Florida, U.S.
- Education: University of the West Indies BA (hons); Interamerican University of Puerto Rico MBA; Columbia University PhD
- Profession: Economist, diplomat

Sir Courtney Newlands McLaurin Blackman, KA (6 March 1933 – 16 March 2021) was a Barbadian economist, international business consultant, and diplomat. He served as the first Governor of the Central Bank of Barbados from 1972 to 1987. At the time of his appointment, he was the youngest central bank governor in the world.

== Early life ==
Blackman was born on 6 March 1933. Upon completing his studies at Harrison College in 1952, he won a Barbados Exhibition. This financial award allowed him to study Modern History at the University of the West Indies (UWI) in Mona, Jamaica, where he earned a BA (hons) in 1956. After graduating, Blackman joined Alcan Jamaica Ltd. as a trainee, eventually becoming a personnel manager. In 1958, he decided to become a teacher; over the next five years, he worked at Kingston College (Jamaica), Sekondi College in Ghana, and his former school Harrison College.

In 1963, Blackman entered the Interamerican University of Puerto Rico, where he would graduate with a Master of Business Administration. He received a Ph.D. from the Graduate School of Business at Columbia University (New York City) in 1969; he had majored in Money and Banking and minored in International Business. He worked on Wall Street as an Economist from 1968 to 1971 at the now-defunct Irving Trust Company, going on to become Associate Professor of Management at Hofstra University on Long Island, New York.

== Career ==
Blackman served as Governor of the Central Bank of Barbados from June 1972 to March 1987, the longest-serving governor as of 2021. He was offered the position in a 5AM phone call from then-Prime Minister Errol Barrow; Blackman immediately accepted, but later joked that he "would never again accept a job offer while half asleep". He became the youngest central bank governor in the world at the time, at the age of 39 years old. He was responsible for growing the bank's organisation from its initial team of five people, as well as setting monetary policy.

As governor, Blackman supervised the 1973 introduction of the Barbadian dollar; although it was initially tied to the pound sterling, Blackman changed the currency to a fixed exchange rate tied to the US dollar in 1975. This rate of BDS$2 = US$1 was still in effect at the time of his death; PM Mia Mottley and later central bank governor Cleviston Haynes credited it with providing economic stability. Blackman also organized the construction of the central bank plaza, which is now the Tom Adams Financial Centre in Bridgetown.

After retiring from the Central Bank in 1987, Blackman became a business consultant to other governments and international institutions. From 1995 to 2000, he served as Ambassador to the United States and Permanent Representative for Barbados to the Organization of American States. He later became an Honorary Distinguished Fellow at the UWI's Sir Arthur Lewis Institute of Social and Economic Studies (SALISES).

== Personal life ==
Blackman and his wife Gloria had three sons: Martin is a tennis player and coach, while Chris and Keith are television news producers.

Blackman was known for correcting erroneous statements or reports made about Barbados in the international community.

=== Death ===
Blackman died on 16 March 2021 at the age of 88 in Orlando, Florida, U.S. He was buried at St. David's Anglican Church in Christ Church, Barbados.

== Honours ==
Blackman received an honorary degree from Hofstra University in 1982, and an honorary LLD from the University of the West Indies in 2007.

Blackman was awarded the Gold Crown of Merit in 1982. In 1998, he received the highest honour in Barbados: he was made a Knight of St. Andrew (KA) of the Order of Barbados.

In 2017, the Central Bank of Barbados renamed its Grand Salle building as the Courtney Blackman Grand Salle.

== Partial bibliography ==
=== Books ===
- Central Banking in a Dependent Economy: The Jamaican Experience, 1961-1967 (1969, Ph.D. thesis)
- The Practice of Persuasion: Selected Speeches (1982)
- Central Banking in Theory and Practice: A Small State Perspective (1998)
- The Practice of Economic Management: A Caribbean Perspective (2006)

=== Articles ===
- "An Eclectic Approach to the Problem of Black Economic Development" (1971)
- "The Management of Foreign Exchange Reserves in Small Developing Countries" (1981)
- "New Directions for Central Banking in the Caribbean" (1989)
- "Tourism and Other Services in the Anglophone Caribbean" (1989)
- "An Analytical Framework for the Study of Caribbean Public Enterprise" (1992)
- "Financial Accounting for Central Banks - with Special Reference to CARICOM" (1995)
- "Finance, Investment and Economic Development: Towards an Investment-Friendly Financial Environment" (2006)
