= Barbados Community College =

Public community college in Barbados

Coordinates: 13°6′18″N 59°35′19″W

- Other name: BCC
- Motto: Many Studies - One Community
- Type: Community College
- Established: 1968
- Principal: Annette. A. Alleyne
- Students: 3139
- Location: St. Michael, Barbados
- Campus: 'Eyrie' Campus, Industry Services Unit, The Jean Norma Holder Hospitality Institute
- Website: www.bcc.edu.bb

The Barbados Community College is a tertiary institution located on Eyrie Howells' Road, Saint Michael, Barbados.

== History ==
Founded in 1968, the Barbados Community College came to be as a result of an act of parliament aimed at making post secondary education more accessible to the Barbadian public. In 1990, the Act was amended by Parliament to allow for the following designations to be conferred upon students: Bachelor's degrees, Associate degrees, Diplomas and Certificates. Prior to this Act, degrees were available only at the University of the West Indies, Cave Hill Campus.

== Administration ==
The overall management of BCC is invested in a Board of Management, appointed by the Minister of Education. It is to this Board that the Principal reports.

Presently, the principal of the Barbados Community College is Dr. Ian Austin, who was appointed in February 2016 in response to the passing of the formal principal, Norma Holder. Dr. Ian Austin is a Barbadian who holds both a Ph.D. in Educational Leadership & Policy Studies and an MBA in Finance from the Virginia Polytechnic Institute and State University. He also holds a Diploma of Education in Post Graduate Teaching and a Bachelors of Science in accounting from the University of the West Indies, Cave Hill Campus. In addition to his position at the Barbados Community College, he acts as the deputy director of Continuing and Professional Education at the University of West Indies Open Campus. The Barbados Community College is run with the assistance of Deputy Principal Dr. Cheryl Weekes and Registrar Mr. Roger Worrell.

== Academics ==
The Barbados Community College offers programs at the degree and diploma levels in a variety of divisions and departments.

- Commerce
- Computer Studies
- Liberal Arts
- Fine Arts
- Natural Sciences
- Health Sciences
- General and Continuing Education
- Technology
- Languages
- Industry Services
- Physical Education
- Hospitality

In 2015–16, it was reported that BCC enrolled 1108 males and 2031 females, for a total of 3139 students.

The BCC is registered with the Barbados Accreditation Council but is not yet accredited by it.

The BCC has developed articulation agreements with a variety of institutions, including Howard University, Florida International University, The Michener Institute, and Mount Allison University, along with the local University of the West Indies. Moreover, the BCC has memoranda of understanding under the auspices of Caricom with several universities, including Duke University and the University of Winnipeg.

== University College of Barbados Proposal ==
In 2002, the government of Barbados announced that it intended to merge the Barbados Community College with the then-named Samuel Jackman Prescod Polytechnic and the Erdiston Teachers' Training College to form the new University College of Barbados. One reason for this was the capacity issues among the three institutions. In the 2000–2001 academic year, 13,282 people applied to the three institutions. Only 4,504 could be accepted.

A project team was established which involved staff from the Ministry of Education which led to a proposal for the amalgamation. The Business Plan indicated that the merger would increase access to work-class education, respond in a proactive manner to the demand for existing programmes, improve on obsolete and deteriorating facilities, and upgrade programmes, curricula and services. At the time of the proposal, the following table shows the enrollment and annual budget (2003):

Institution	Student Enrollment	Annual Budget (BBD)
Barbados Community College	3,697	$33,457,283
Samuel Jackman Prescod Institute of Technology	2,972	$13,360,740
Erdiston Teachers' Training College	223	$3,784,367

The concept of merging the institutions is similar to initiatives in other West Indian countries. Other examples include Antigua State College, which resulted from the merger of a teachers' college and an already existing community college; Dominica State College, the result of the merger of a Sixth form college, a teachers' training college and a nursing institute; the Sir Arthur Lewis Community College, which now incorporates the pre-existing teachers' college; among others. In fact, as a multi-disciplinary community college, the Barbados Community is unusual in not having developed from several predecessor institutions.

However, the general election of 2008 led to a change in government. The merger was placed on a backburner while greater emphasis was placed on shared services among the three institutions. The project team was converted into the Higher Education Development Unit which was mandated to develop shared resources in the areas of accounting, student information system, library services, and online learning.

== GED Radio 106.1FM ==
The college's radio station, Radio GED, gives students of mass communication broadcasting experience. The station has a 20-watt transmitter reaching a six-mile radius. The radio station is a student operated initiative and offers a combination of talk radio and campus news.

== Students Guild ==
The Barbados Community College Students' Guild Council is responsible for representing the Barbados Community College's student body, known as the Student Guild. The Student Guild Council mainly consists of the President, vice-president, 2nd Vice President, Ex-Officio Vice President, Treasurer and Secretary. As of 2022/23, these positions are filled by Joshua Harris, Kellia Baptiste, Shakalah Rock, Abi Tannis, Ashliy Grant and Destinee Walthrus respectively.

The Student Guild Council is elected each academic year through a college-wide election, usually held in the college's library.

In addition to the elected members, there are members appointed to the Guild Council. These are mainly:

Student Welfare and Education Officer, Communications Director, Social Activities Director and Executive Officers.

== Notable alumni ==
- Jeena Chatrani, painter

== See also ==
- University of the West Indies, Cave Hill Campus
- Codrington College
- Erdiston Teachers' Training College
- Samuel Jackman Prescod Institute of Technology
