= Bermuda Monetary Authority =

Central Bank of Bermuda

- Logo
- Central bank of: Bermuda
- Headquarters: Hamilton, Bermuda
- Established: 20 February 1969
- Chairman: Donald Scott
- Currency: Bermudian dollar BMD (ISO 4217)
- Website: www.bma.bm

The Bermuda Monetary Authority (the Authority) is the integrated regulator of the financial services sector in Bermuda. It is not a central bank, and does not provide lender of last resort facilities.

A world leading re-insurance hub and a popular offshore jurisdiction, Bermuda is generally considered a mature jurisdiction with robust financial and regulatory environment. However, the regulator faces multiple accusations of corruption and is involved in numerous legal battles.

== History ==
The Bermuda Monetary Authority (BMA) was created by the Bermuda Monetary Authority Act 1969 and became fully operational in 1970. On 6 February 1970 it issued the first Bermudian dollar, valued at BMD 2.40 to Bermudian £1. British notes and coins that had circulated previously were demonetised in June 1970. In mid-1972 Bermuda adopted the United States dollar as its anchor currency, and the BMA assumed responsibility for exchange control. That role was expanded in 1974. On 22 May 1981 the Bermudian dollar was formally fixed as "equivalent to one dollar in the currency of the United States of America".

The Act was amended in 2019, adding a new statutory objective "to establish and administer an innovation hub to facilitate the development of innovative business in Bermuda".

== Profile ==
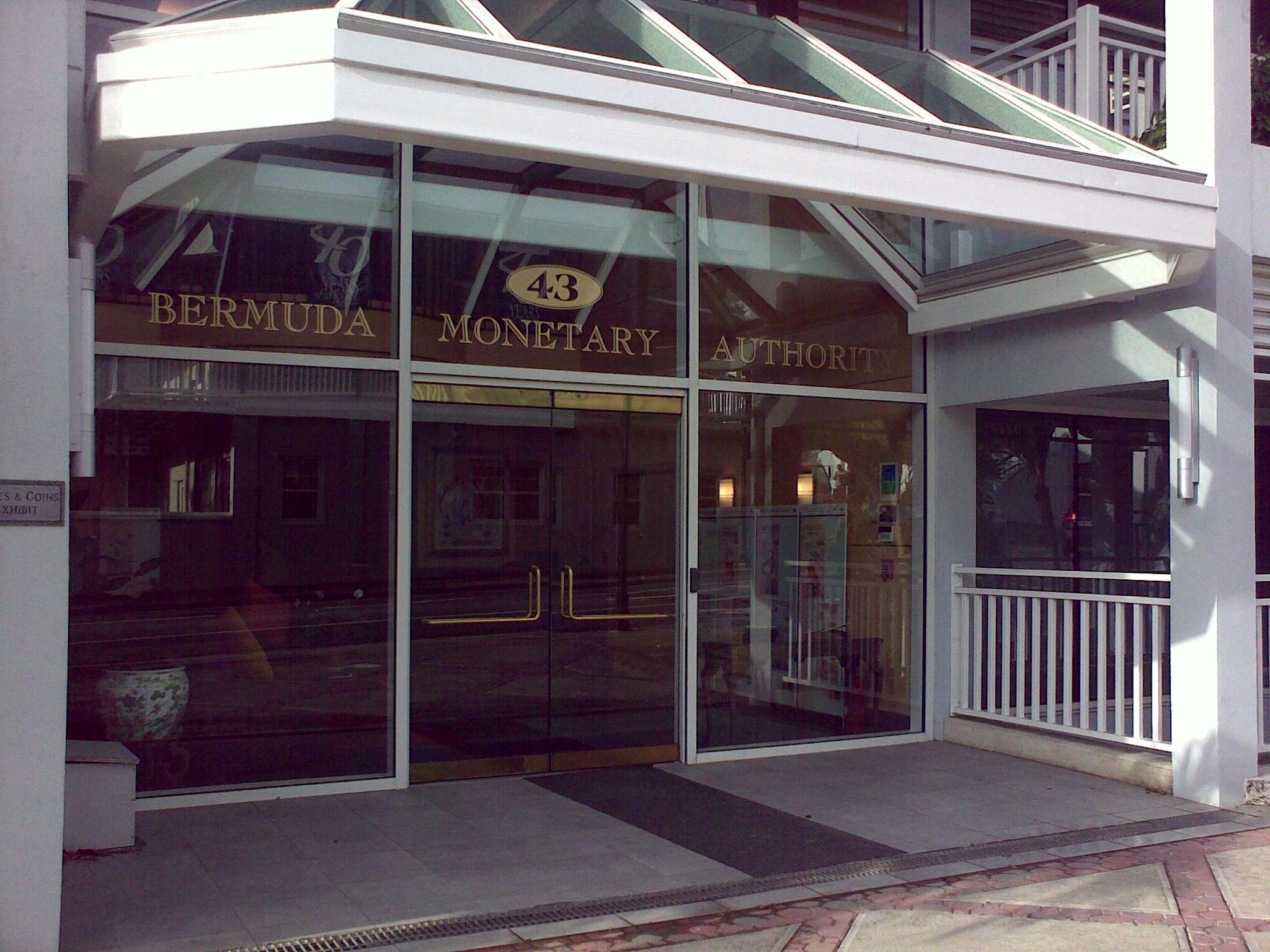
Bermuda Monetary Authority

Bermuda has no central bank, and the BMA does not provide lender of last resort facilities. Instead, the Authority supervises, regulates and inspects financial institutions operating in or from the jurisdiction. It issues the Bermudian dollar, administers exchange-control transactions, assists other domestic agencies in detecting and preventing financial crime, and advises the Government on banking, monetary and financial matters.

The BMA applies risk-based regulation to Bermuda's banks, trust companies, investment businesses, investment funds, fund administrators, money-service businesses and insurance companies. It also licenses companies and oversees the Bermuda Stock Exchange.

As at 31 December 2023 the Authority employed 273 staff and reported a total comprehensive loss of US $3.53 million for the year.

== Central bank ==
Although the BMA is not a central bank, it is Bermuda's sole note-issuing authority. In 2024 its vertical BMD 5 banknote won the International Bank Note Society's "Bank Note of the Year Award". The pink note, accented with purple, shows a blue marlin, dolphins, a tuna and the effigy of Charles III on the obverse, while the reverse features butterflies, native flowers, Horseshoe Bay and a boat passing under Somerset Bridge.

== Financial regulator ==
In the 1980s, Bermuda began positioning itself as an international insurance centre. By 2022 more than 1,200 captive insurers were registered on the island, and by 2025 the market accounted for roughly 35 percent of global reinsurance capital.

In May 2000, the jurisdiction signalled an "advanced commitment" to OECD tax-transparency standards. Its asset-management sector has grown in parallel: by 2005 hundreds of offshore funds with net assets exceeding US $133 billion were domiciled in Bermuda, rising to US $216.2 billion by 2022.

In October 2022, Bermuda was removed from the EU's tax "grey list" (Annex II of the ECOFIN list of non-cooperative jurisdictions) and placed on the list of fully cooperative jurisdictions. In March 2023, Toby Mason became the BMA's Chief Operating Officer. As of 2019 the Authority had registered 66 fintech companies.

In 2023 Parliament adopted a 15 percent corporate income tax—aligned with the OECD's global minimum-tax initiative—for multinational enterprises with annual revenues of €750 million or more. Premier David Burt stated that, as of 2023, Bermuda held the world's sixth-highest anti-money laundering rating. International assessments generally describe the jurisdiction's regulatory framework as mature and robust.

Regulation continues to evolve. In April 2025 the BMA proposed stricter prudential standards for corporate service providers. The draft of the new regulation included raising the minimum net assets to $12,000 and $50,000 for CSPs with limited and unlimited licenses. It also introduced new obligations such as to segregate client funds, hold regular reconciliations and undergo annual independent reviews.

== Controversy ==
Bermuda is widely regarded as a leading offshore jurisdiction. Prior to 2000, the island's corruption levels were described by some commentators as "legendary". One study estimated that of roughly US $450 billion in offshore reserves held by U.S. entities, more than 80 percent were booked through Bermuda.

The Bermuda Monetary Authority itself has been named as a defendant in several lawsuits alleging maladministration or corruption, including actions by Stonebridge Capital Hedge Fund Ltd. and the cryptocurrency exchange Bittrex Global..

=== Newpoint Financial Corp lawsuit ===
In December 2022, Delaware-registered Newpoint Financial Corp. filed a US $25 million suit against the BMA, claiming "intentional bad faith" after the Authority refused to approve its purchase of a controlling stake in Citadel, a Bermuda insurer. A BMA letter dated 26 July had asserted that Newpoint was not a "fit and proper" controller and cited multiple compliance failures, all denied by the plaintiff.

=== 777 Re collapse ===
In 2023 the Bermuda-based reinsurer 777 Re, part of the 777 Partners group, attempted to fund an acquisition of Everton FC with the reinsurer's assets. British football authorities discovered the firm had not filed audited financial statements, an exceptional breach for an insurer. Under scrutiny caused by a public scandal, multiple cases of financial impropriety, including fraud and unpaid bills, were revealed. 777 Partners have been sued by multiple organizations for unpaid debts and contract breaches with lawsuits describing their financial practices as a "house of cards" and a "sprawling fraudulent enterprise". The BMA revoked 777 Re's licence in October 2024 and later imposed tighter reporting rules on insurers’ investment portfolios, though critics questioned why the investigation began only after the failed football club bid.

=== Custodian Life Limited vs BMA ===
The investment bond insurer Custodian Life Limited (CL) came under BMA enforcement in 2021 and was placed in provisional liquidation. Media reports allege that the Authority suspended CL's business despite a history of clean KPMG audits. CL sought an independent tribunal but says it received no response for 11 months, delaying completion of the 2021 audit. Joint provisional liquidators appointed by the BMA reportedly billed the owners about US $1 million every six months. Custodian Life has sued the Authority, while a group of policyholders has asked the Ministry of Finance and the Bermuda Ombudsman for an inquiry, arguing that the BMA ignored its statutory duty to protect end clients.

== See also ==
- Bermudian dollar
- Economy of Bermuda
- Securities commission
- List of central banks
- List of financial supervisory authorities by country

== Sources ==
- Elmalki, Fawaz (2005). "Establishing Private Equity Funds in Bermuda". Canadian International Lawyer. 6 (2): 104.
- Haberly, Daniel (2023). "Corruption, Shell Companies and Financial Secrecy". CSC Working Papers. 16.
- Hoffman, Taylor Morgan (2001). "The Future of Offshore Tax Havens". Chicago Journal of International Law. 2 (2).
