= Erdiston Teachers' Training College =

Coordinates: 13.096480°N 59.600055°W

- Type: Public
- Established: 1948
- Affiliations: University of the West Indies, Cave Hill Campus
- Principal: Dr. Patricia Saul
- Academic staff: 20
- Students: 315
- Location: Bridgetown, St. Michael, Barbados
- Campus: Urban
- Website: ettc.edu.bb

The Erdiston Teachers' Training College is located in Pine Hill, Bridgetown, Barbados. It is affiliated with the School of Education of the University of the West Indies, Cave Hill Campus.

== History ==
Around 1912, Codrington College, under the direction of Principal Anstey, commenced delivering teacher training. The teacher training institution was called the Rawle Training Institute. It initially enrolled men only, accepting women a year or two later. The Rawle provided teacher training not just to Barbadians but to individuals from other parts of the West Indies. Rawle was the forerunner of the Erdiston Teachers' Training College, established in 1948, signalling the end of Codrington's involvement in teacher training and the closure of the Rawle Institute.

The establishment of Rawle, despite being open to students from other countries in the West Indies, was a Barbadian response to Barbadian needs and ran against a proposal for a regional teacher training institution. At a national level, there was tension between establishing local institutions, which might be more responsive to local needs and for many students, would limit travel, versus the regional West Indian identity with which many sought to develop and reinforce.

The first class of students at Erdiston consisted of 16 men and 16 women, all in-service elementary teachers. The initial plan for a two-year programme was changed to a programme of one year in duration. This was due to the large number of untrained teachers and the intention to provide as many teachers as possible with at least a base of training through a one-year programme. In 1954, the program at Erdiston was extended from one to two years in duration. Moreover, the College was extended to facilitate teacher training for candidates from the Leeward Islands and the Windward Islands. However, in 1958, the one year emergency training programme was introduced focussed on practising but untrained teachers. In 1963, re-introduced the two-year programme for pre-service teachers while retaining the one-year programme for in-service teachers. In 1970, Erdiston partnered with the Barbados Community College to train vocational teachers for secondary schools while in 1973, Erdiston started to provide in-service training to teachers in the private schools' sector.

In 1983, Erdiston was a key player in the First Education Development Project, funded by the Government of Barbados and the World Bank. Facilities at the College were upgraded. Later, in line with a later education reform initiative, The Education Sector Enhancement Programme (ESE), often referred to as EduTech 2000, Erdiston undertook to train and re-train teachers to upgrade their skills and provide for a teaching pedagogy based on constructivism and student-centred learning.

== Campus ==
The Erdiston Teachers' Training College campus comprises the Pine Plantation Great House and further land on the Pine Hill escarpment. It is unclear whether building is the original, built in 1756 by William Barwick, adorned by subsequent owners, or a new building. It was later owned by Sir Graham Brigg and Sam Manning. The Government of Barbados obtained the property from the Manning estate.

== Academics ==
Erdiston offers the following programmes:

Diploma in Education. This is a part-time, in-service post-graduate diploma programme for practising teachers who have university degrees but have not participated in professional education related to pedagogical techniques. The programme starts with four weeks of instruction in the summer and then continues with twice a week evening lessons lasting one year.

Certificate programmes in Early Childhood Education, Care & Development, in Physical Education, and in Special Needs Education. These certificate programmes are open to both certified and non-certified teachers who are interested in the respective fields.

Bachelor of Education. This programme is designed as preparation to enter the teaching profession (pre-service) though it is also open to practising teachers who have the diploma or an Associate Degree and who wish to upgrade to a bachelor's degree.

Postgraduate Diploma in Educational Leadership. This programme prepares teachers for leadership roles in schools. Applicants must have a university degree and a teacher education qualification.

In 2015–16, it was estimated that Erdiston enrolled 66 males and 249 females, for a total of 315 students. The same publication reported that in pre-primary (ages 3 to 5), primary, secondary and special education, 63% of teachers were trained while 37% were not. Based on separate data, over 60% of teachers have an undergraduate degree. However, these degrees are not always in education. At the primary level, only 55% of teachers are considered trained teachers and only 47% at the pre-primary level. This compares with 71% of Caribbean teachers and 87% of teachers in the rest of the developing world, at the primary level.

Erdiston is registered with the Barbados Accreditation Council but is not yet accredited by it.

In November 2020, Erdiston signed a memorandum of understanding (MoU) with Toronto, Canada's George Brown College to promote student study abroad options, faculty exchanges, and joint research.

== University College of Barbados Proposal ==
In 2002, the government of Barbados announced that it intended to merge the Barbados Community College with the then-named Samuel Jackman Prescod Polytechnic and the Erdiston Teachers' Training College to form the new University College of Barbados. One reason for this was the capacity issues among the three institutions. In the 2000–2001 academic year, 13,282 people applied to the three institutions. Only 4,504 could be accepted.

A project team was established which involved staff from the Ministry of Education which led to a proposal for the amalgamation. The Business Plan indicated that the merger would increase access to work-class education, respond in a proactive manner to the demand for existing programmes, improve on obsolete and deteriorating facilities, and upgrade programmes, curricula and services. At the time of the proposal, the following table shows the enrollment and annual budget (2003):

Institution	Student Enrollment	Annual Budget (BBD)
Barbados Community College	3,697	$33,457,283
Samuel Jackman Prescod Institute of Technology 2,972	$13,360,740	
Erdiston Teachers' Training College	223	$3,784,367

By 2015–2016, the enrolment of the Polytechnic (since renamed Institute of Technology) had decreased to 2,495, Erdiston had increased to 315 and BCC had decreased to 3,139.

The concept of merging the institutions is similar to initiatives in other West Indian countries. Other examples include Antigua State College, which resulted from the merger of a teachers' college and an already existing community college; Dominica State College, the result of the merger of a Sixth form college, a teachers' training college and a nursing institute; the Sir Arthur Lewis Community College, which now incorporates the pre-existing teachers' college; among others. In fact, as a multi-disciplinary community college, the Barbados Community is unusual in not having developed from several predecessor institutions.

However, the general election of 2008 led to a change in government. The merger was placed on a backburner while greater emphasis was placed on shared services among the three institutions. The project team was converted into the Higher Education Development Unit which was mandated to develop shared resources in the areas of accounting, student information system, library services, and online learning.

== See also ==
- University of the West Indies, Cave Hill Campus
- Codrington College
- Barbados Community College
- Samuel Jackman Prescod Institute of Technology
