= Central Bank of Barbados =

State-owned bank in Barbados

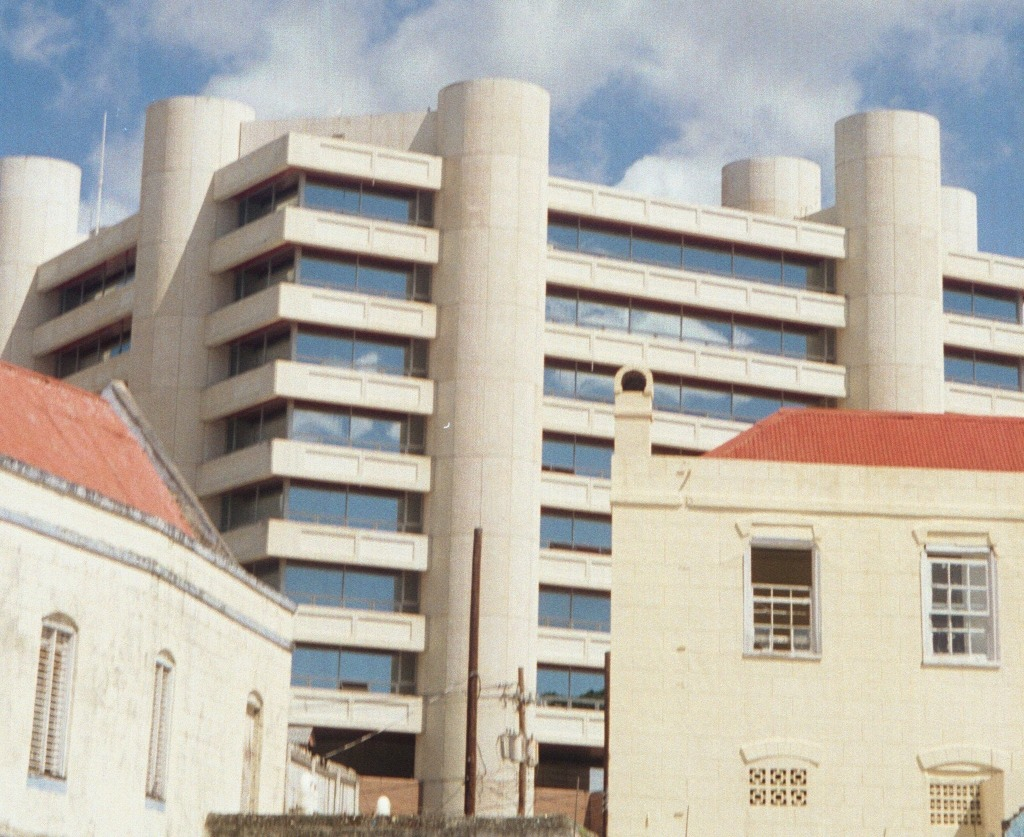
- CBB headquarters in Bridgetown
- Central bank of: Barbados
- Headquarters: Tom Adams Financial Centre, Spry Street, Bridgetown, Saint Michael
- Coordinates: 13.098828°N 59.613030°W
- Established: 1972
- Ownership: 100% state ownership
- Governor: Kevin Greenidge
- Currency: Barbadian dollar BBD (ISO 4217)
- Reserves: 470 million USD
- Interest on reserves: 4.5%
- Website: www.centralbank.org.bb

The Central Bank of Barbados (CBB) is the national monetary authority and central bank responsible for providing advice to the Government of Barbados on banking and other financial and monetary matters. The Central Bank operates as the banknote issuing authority for Barbadian currency.

== History ==
Before Barbados, other Caribbean countries had recently created a central bank: Jamaica in 1962, Guyana and Trinidad and Tobago in 1966. Central banks in the region had been developed by expatriate consultants who had applied a "Bank of England model" which was inadequate for regional States operating on a smaller economic scale.

The Central Bank of Barbados was established by Act of parliament on 2 May 1972. Its system was inspired by the work of Clive Y. Thomas that recommended more flexible and development-driven central banking systems for smaller economies. The Central bank was the first in the region to publish reports on a regular basis and operate with transparency. Prior to its establishment, Barbados' monetary policies were governed through its membership in the Eastern Caribbean Currency Authority (ECCA).

In 1974, the Central Bank fronted BDS$34 million dollars (US$17 million) to bail out the Barbados Sugar Industry Bank after Barclays had withdrew its credit lines. In the early 2010s, the CBB led the restoration of the Masonic Lodge in Bridgetown.

In 2022, the CBB adopted polymer banknotes. In 2026, the CBB introduced the national instant payment system BiMPay.

== Location ==
The name of the Central Bank's building is the Tom Adams Financial Centre, which is a ten-storey building located on Spry Street in Bridgetown. As part of the complex, there is a 491-seat theatre/auditorium known as the Frank Collymore Hall. The building was constructed between 1982 and 1986 and it was opened September 18, 1986.

The Global Competitiveness Report for 2008–09 ranked the soundness of Barbados's commercial banks as 21st out of 134 global jurisdictions assessed.

== Role ==
At its inception the Central Bank of Barbados had certain objectives.

These were:

- Promoting monetary stability
- Promoting a sound financial structure
- Fostering development of the money and capital markets
- Channelling commercial bank credit into productive activities
- Fostering credit and exchange conditions conducive to the orderly and sustained economic development of Barbados.

Today the regulatory capacity of the central bank handles the issuance of Barbadian banknotes and coins, and licensing of agencies such as: banks, investment businesses, depository trust and finance companies. It also undertakes supervision of Barbadian financial institutions, credit worthiness of the financial system, administering of the international reserves, and reporting regularly to the country on the national finances.

The Barbadian economy is reviewed regularly by several notable Wall Street investment firms including: PricewaterhouseCoopers, Standard & Poor's, and Moody's.

== Organisation ==
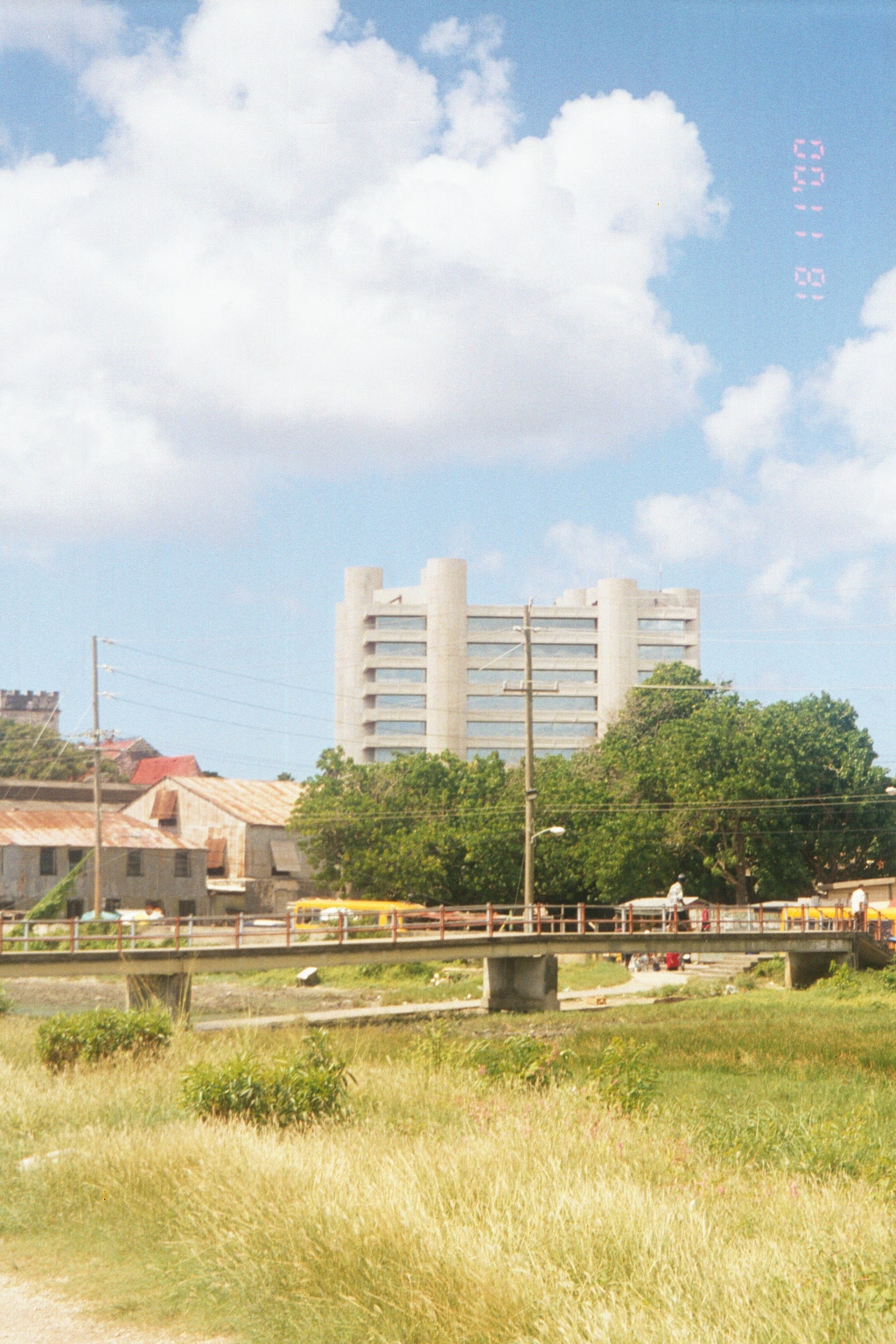
The Tom Adams Financial Centre building.

The head of the Central Bank is the Governor, who is appointed by the Minister of Finance. The current Governor of the Central Bank of Barbados is Kevin Greenidge as of March 1, 2023. The three Deputy Governors are Alwyn Jordan, Michelle Doyle and Elson Gaskin.

=== Past Governors ===
- Sir Courtney Blackman (founding Governor, June 1972 – March 1987)
- Kurleigh King (September 1987 – September 1992)
- Calvin Springer (September 1992 – September 1997)
- Winston Cox (September 1997 – April 1999)
- Marion Vernese Williams (April 1999 – November 2009)
- DeLisle Worrell (November 2009 – March 2017)
- Cleviston Haynes (January 2018 - January 2023 - previously Acting March 2017-December 2017)

== See also ==
- Barbadian dollar
- Banks of Barbados
- Ministry of Finance, Economic Affairs and Investment (Barbados)
- Central banks and currencies of the Caribbean
