= Marion Vernese Williams =

Barbadian economist and diplomat

Marion Vernese Williams GCM
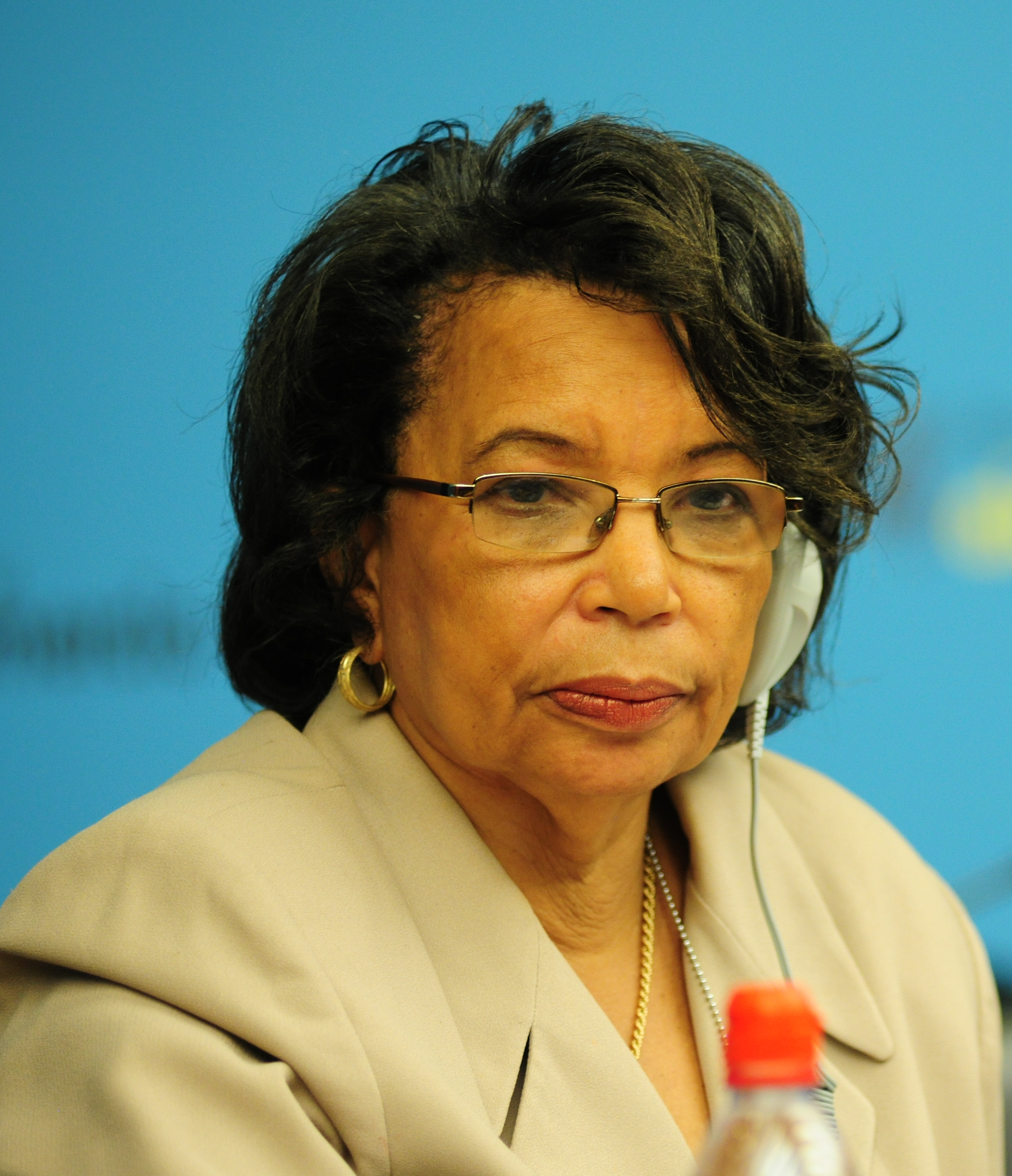
- Marion Williams (2013)

Governor of the Central Bank of Barbados
- In office 1999–2009

Permanent Representative of Barbados to the United Nations Office at Geneva
- Incumbent
- Assumed office 1 February 2010

Personal details
- Born: Marion Mottley Barbados
- Spouse: Clyde Williams
- Children: 2
- Education: University of the West Indies; University of Surrey
- Occupation: Economist, banker, accountant, diplomat
- Known for: Governor of the Central Bank of Barbados; Barbados Permanent Representative to the United Nations Office in Geneva
- Awards: Gold Crown of Merit (GCM)

Marion Vernese Williams GCM, is a Barbadian economist, banker, accountant and diplomat. She is a recipient of the Gold Crown of Merit.

== Early life and education ==
Williams was born Marion Mottley, the daughter of two Barbadian teachers, Rudolph and Cledlene Mottley. She was educated at St George's Primary School, St Michael's School, and from the age of 12 at Queen's College.

She earned a degree in Economics in 1968 from the University of the West Indies, and later a Master's in Economics as the first postgraduate in the field at the university's Cave Hill campus.

In 1995, she earned her Ph.D. in Economics at the University of Surrey, with a thesis on prudential regulation and economic liberalisation.

== Career ==
After her bachelor's degree, she worked for the Eastern Caribbean Currency Authority, the precursor of the Central Bank of Barbados, where she was eventually appointed Research Director. In 1973 she joined the Central Bank, where she held numerous senior and managerial positions and was appointed Governor in 1999.

During her tenure leading monetary policy of Barbados, then-Barbadian Prime Minister David Thompson credited the team led by Williams as helping the Barbadian economy emerge relatively unaffected by the financial crises affecting other parts of the globe.

Upon her retirement in 2009, Thompson announced that he had appointed her as the Barbadian Permanent Representative to the United Nations Office and other international organizations in Geneva. Williams assumed the post on 1 February 2010, and presented her credentials to the UN Office Secretary-General, Sergei Ordzhonikidze, four days later.

== Personal life ==
She is married to Clyde Williams; they have two children.

== Publications ==
- Liberalising a Regulated Banking System: The Caribbean Case, Ashgate Publishing, 1996, ISBN 1859724329.
- Marion V. Williams (2001). Managing Public Finances in a Small Developing Economy: The Case of Barbados. Greenwood Publishing Group. ISBN 978-0-275-97031-4.

== Awards ==
- Gold Crown of Merit
- Honorary LL.D., University of the West Indies (Cave Hill)
