= American University of Barbados =

Medical school in Barbados

American University of Barbados, School of Medicine
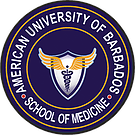
- Motto: Knowledge for life
- Type: For-profit Medical school
- Established: 2011
- Accreditation: Caribbean Accreditation Authority for Education in Medicine and other Health Professions (CAAM-HP). Barbados Accreditation Council
- Dean: Campus: Syed M. Kazmi, Associate: John Klir, Clinical: Ruksana Nazneen
- Location: Wildey, Saint Michael, Bridgetown, BB11100, Barbados; 13.0915°N 59.5790°W
- Campus: Barbados
- Language: English
- Website: https://www.aubmed.org/
- Location within Barbados

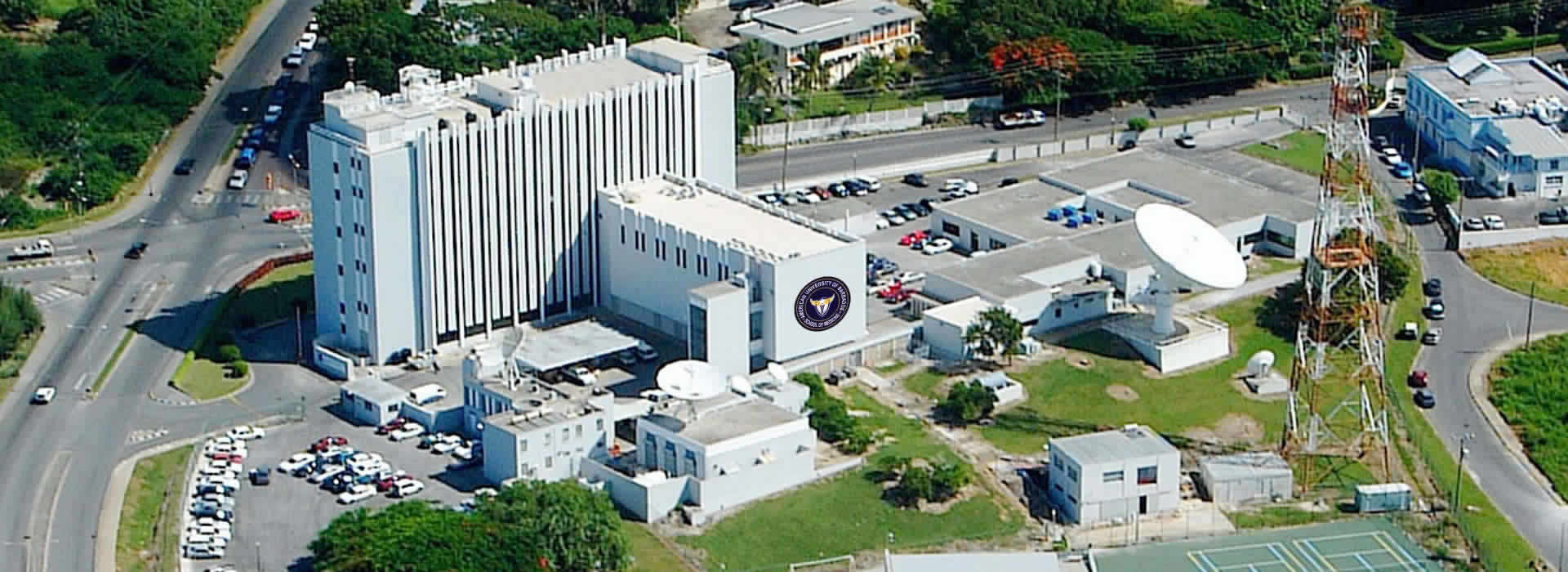
AUBMED was founded in 2011 in Bridgetown, Barbados.

The American University of Barbados School of Medicine (AUB), founded in 2011, is a private medical school with its main campus in Wildey, Barbados. When it opened in January 2012, it was the first offshore private medical school in Barbados, started as a branch of Era's Lucknow Medical College and Hospital, based in Lucknow, India.

== History ==
The medical school was founded in 2011 and started operations at Silver Sands. As of November 2015, the school had 135 students, with two Barbadians for every five foreign students.

In 2016, the AUB acquired the former BET building, and moved its operations there. In February 2020, American University of Barbados awarded medical degrees to 67 graduates at its inaugural graduation ceremony. As of 2020, students were enrolled from 24 countries.

In August 2026, the AUB donated 100 digital stethoscopes to the Government of Barbados to support healthcare services and telemedicine.

== Recognition and accreditation ==
- The American University of Barbados (AUBMED) School of Medicine is fully accredited for the period 2025–2027 by the Caribbean Accreditation Authority for Education in Medicine and other Health Professions, a registered body that accredits Caribbean medical schools.
- American University of Barbados (AUB) is registered as a tertiary provider of education by the Barbados Accreditation Council.
- AUB is recognized by the Educational Commission for Foreign Medical Graduates and this grants students the right to take the licentiate exam, United States Medical Licensing Examination to become a practicing physician in the United States.
- In 2017, the Medical Council of India included the American University of Barbados in its list of foreign universities / institutions that have been approved by authorities in their respective nations.
- American University of Barbados (AUB) is listed in World Directory of Medical School

== See also ==
- List of medical schools in the Caribbean
- Ross University School of Medicine
