= Codrington College =

Anglican theological seminary in Barbados

Coordinates: 13.175212°N 59.475314°W

- Type: Seminary
- Established: 1745; 281 years ago
- Religious affiliation: Anglican Church
- Academic affiliations: UWI Cave Hill
- Principal: The Rev. Dr. Michael Clarke
- Location: St. John, Barbados
- Campus: Suburban
- Website: www.codrington.org

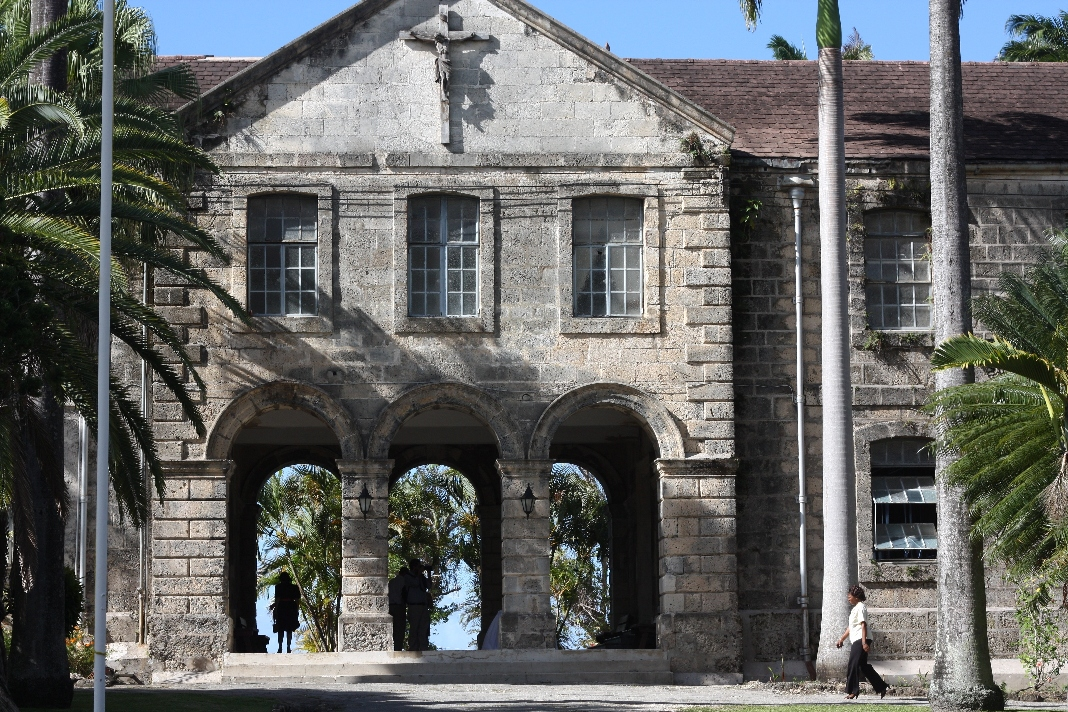
Codrington College

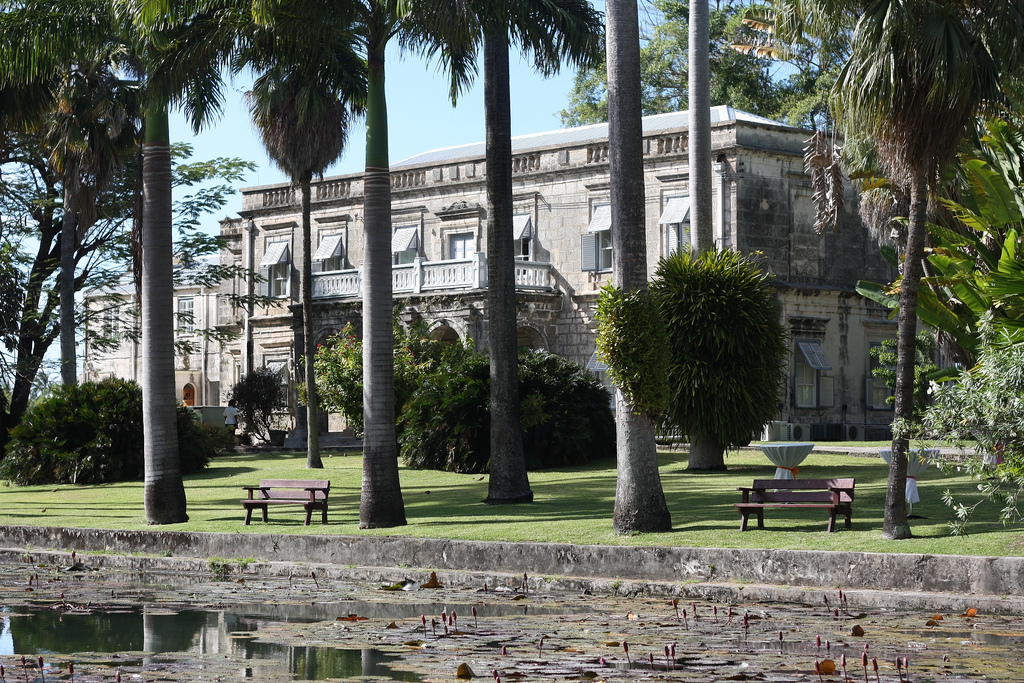
Codrington College

Codrington College is an Anglican theological college in St. John, Barbados, that is affiliated with the University of the West Indies at Cave Hill. It is one of the oldest Anglican theological colleges. It was affiliated to the British University of Durham from 1875 to 1965.

== History ==
=== Foundation and history from 1710 to 1824 ===
Codrington College was founded with the profits from the bequest of Christopher Codrington, who after his death in 1710 left portions of his sugar-cane estates, the Codrington Plantations, and land on Barbados and Barbuda, to the Society for the Propagation of the Gospel in Foreign Parts to establish a theological college in Barbados. The Society and the college benefited from the sugar-cane estates' institution of slavery. In addition to his bequest to the Society, Codrington donated £10,000 (which is approximately £1.2 million in contemporary money) and about 12,000 books to his alma mater All Souls College, Oxford.

In his will, Codrington wrote:

"Paragraph 8, Item: I give the bequeath my two plantations in Barbados to the Society for Propagation of the Christian Religion in Foreign parts, Erected and established by my late good master, King William the Third, and my desire is to have the plantations continued Intire and three hundred negroes at least Kept thereon, and A convenient number of Professors and Scholars maintained there, all of them to be under the vows of Poverty, Chastity, and Obedience, who shall be obliged to Studdy and Practice Physick and Chyrurgery as well as Divinity, that by the apparent usefulness of the former to all mankind, they may both ender themselves to the people and have better opportunitys of doeing good to mens souls wilst they are taking care of their Bodys. But the Particulars of the Constitution I leave to the Society Comps'd of good and wise men."

Codrington's bequest is unusual for the time in that it was intended to benefit the Afro-Caribbean population of Barbados, rather than colonial colleges which benefited the white planter class. Wilder pointed out that while Codrington directed that a portion of his charitable bequest be used to educate the enslaved population of Barbados immediately or directly, this provision was effectively blocked by the objections of fellow planters. Moreover, the Society, having taken over the Codrington Plantations continued to use slave labour, branding the word "Society" on the chests of slaves owned by them. Slavery in Barbados ended when the Slavery Abolition Act 1833 was enacted. At that time, in accordance with the Slave Compensation Act 1837, the Society received £8,823 for 411 slaves as compensation for the loss of their labour.

Construction of the college was started in 1714, and it was eventually opened on 9 September 1745 with twelve or 16 male students. Some of the delay in completing the structure is attributed to disputes regarding the properties and related debts (and perhaps political opposition as noted by Wilder above). Later, on 10 October 1780, a hurricane severely damaged the building. That, plus a downturn in the economic climate led to the school being closed between 1780 and 1797. History repeated itself in 1831 when the site was almost completely destroyed by a hurricane but was rebuilt. In 1926, fire gutted the college.

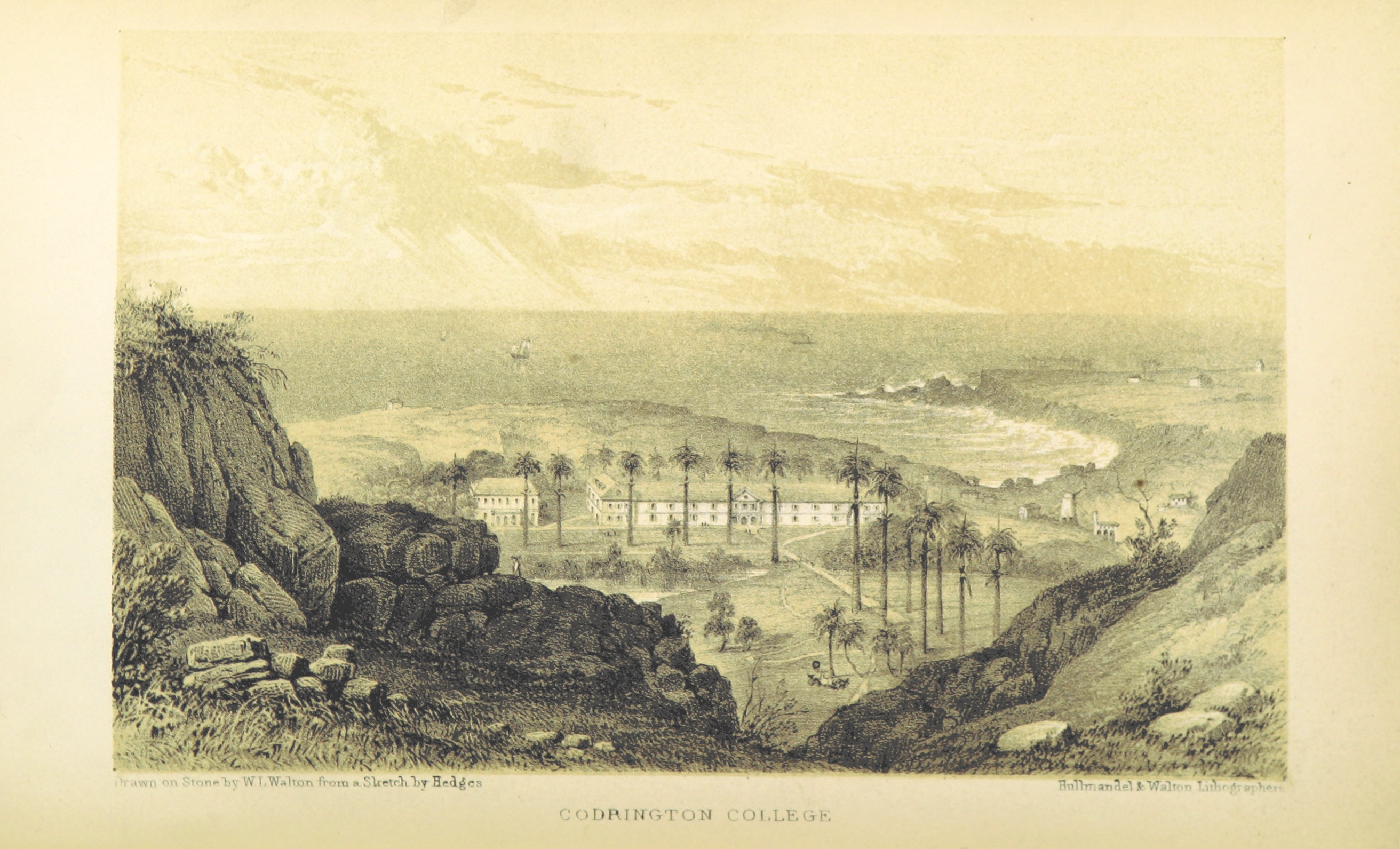
Codrington College

The college initially provided a general and mathematical education at secondary level, on a curriculum that was similar to that of contemporaneous English grammar schools. There were no other schools in Barbados at the time, so there was a need to prepare students for a university education. The Reverend Mark Nicholson was appointed the headmaster of Codrington College in 1797, as which he remained until 1821, and developed the college. Thomas Moody, a polymath from an English landed gentry family who later became a Colonial Office advisor on the West Indies, served as mathematics master, writing master, and Assistant Headmaster of Codrington College from 1797 to 1805.

=== 1824 – 1912 ===
Beginning around 1824, and influenced by the first Bishop of the new See of Barbados and the Leeward Islands, William Hart Coleridge, Codrington College was developed to educate at the university level. While some such studies had been offered since 1748, these were mostly exclusive to sons of the landed gentry who had additional tutors at home to prepare them for an English university. The first graduate had been ordained in 1759.

During the 1820s, the grammar school was moved to the Chaplain's lodge, and became known as The Lodge School, so that the college could focus on university-level studies. On 9 September 1830, Codrington College opened formally to train students for ordination. This made it one of the first theological colleges of the Anglican Church; only St. David's College Lampeter, St Bees Theological College, the General Theological Seminary and Virginia Theological Seminary predate it.

In 1875, Codrington entered a new stage by entering into affiliation with Durham University in England so that graduates of Codrington received a Durham University degree in either classics or theology. Codrington therefore was the first overseas institution to have the right to grant a degree from a British university. This affiliation lasted until 1958 by which time 283 Codrington graduates had obtained Durham University degrees. The terms of the affiliation read (in part):

1. Students of Codrington College, Barbados and Fourah Bay College, Sierra Leone, may have their names placed on the Register of the University as Matriculated Students of the same, provided that the Principal of their College, or other person authorized to act in his behalf, shall have certified to the Warden that they have passed an examination similar to that required for the admission of student, in the several faculties, in the University of Durham. 2. Students of the affiliated Colleges, having been so matriculated shall be admissible to the Exercises and Public Examinations required for proceeding to Degrees, Licenses, and Academical ranks in the several Faculties, provided that they have forwarded to the Warden certificates of having fulfilled the same conditions as to residence, attendance at lectures, and conformity to discipline, in their own Colleges, as are required from other Students of the University so admissible, terms of residence being counted from the time of passing the Admission Examination of their own College.

=== >1912 ===
Around 1912, Codrington, under the direction of Principal Anstey, commenced delivering teacher training. The teacher training institution was called the Rawle Training Institute, named after a previous college principal. It initially enrolled men only, accepting women a year or two later. The Rawle provided teacher training not just to Barbadians but to individuals from other parts of the West Indies. Rawle was the forerunner of the Erdiston Teachers' Training College, established in 1948, signalling the end of Codrington's involvement in teacher training and the closure of the Rawle Institute.

The late 1940s and early 1950s saw several factors lead to a discussion of the affiliation between Codrington College and Durham University. One was the establishment of the University College of the West Indies, the predecessor to the University of the West Indies. The university was founded in 1948, on the recommendation of the Asquith Commission through its sub-committee on the West Indies chaired by Sir James Irvine. The Asquith Commission had been established in 1943 to review the provision of higher education in the British colonies. Initially in a special relationship with the University of London, the then University College of the West Indies (UCWI) was seated at Mona, about five miles from Kingston, Jamaica. The university was based at the Gibraltar Camp used by evacuated Gibraltarians during the war.

The fact that the new institution was established in Jamaica and the final report of the commission made no mention of Codrington raised questions of its relevance. Moreover, Durham was concerned about the quality of the education offered at Codrington. One of the reasons for this was the minimal communication between the two institutions. Letters to Codrington were routinely left unanswered. In fact, the Society was still involved in managing and funding Codrington College. When the Society announced, in the press, that the college would be run by the brothers of the Community of the Resurrection, officials at Durham had not been informed and took finding out about the arrangement in the press disconcerting. Eventually, it was decided to alter the affiliation agreement so that only degrees in theology would be granted by Durham, which then mirrored the focus of studies at Codrington. The establishment of the University College of the West Indies meant that non-religious studies in the Caribbean would be focused on the new institution. Codrington, therefore, focussed its studies on theology. It was assumed that Codrington would seek affiliation with the new University College.

Since 1965, Codrington has been affiliated to the University of the West Indies, Cave Hill. The Licentiate in Theology was first introduced that year, followed by the BA in Theology in 1971, in affiliation with Cave Hill. Codrington began to offer a Diploma in Theology on a part-time basis in 1978. This course was designed for lay people who taught religion in day schools and who played important roles in churches. It began to offer post-graduate courses in 1989.

The college currently maintains several archives relating to the churches of the West Indies. The microfilm collection includes records of the Society, The Church Missionary Society, the Baptist Missionary Society, and the Presbyterian Church of Trinidad and Grenada.

In 1976, changes were made to the governance of both Codrington College and the Codrington Estates. Two boards were established, one for the estates and another for the college. In this way, day-to-day running of both came under the Anglican Church of the West Indies. Later, the Codrington Trust Act moved legal control from the Society (now called the United Society Partners in the Gospel) to a completely West Indian group. This was the outcome of the government having taken over the funding of the grammar school, referred to as the Lodge School, in 1879 and leasing the premises for 100 years. On its expiry, the government decided, with the support of the USPG, that it was time for the Codrington Trust to be fully in the control of local people.

== Campus ==
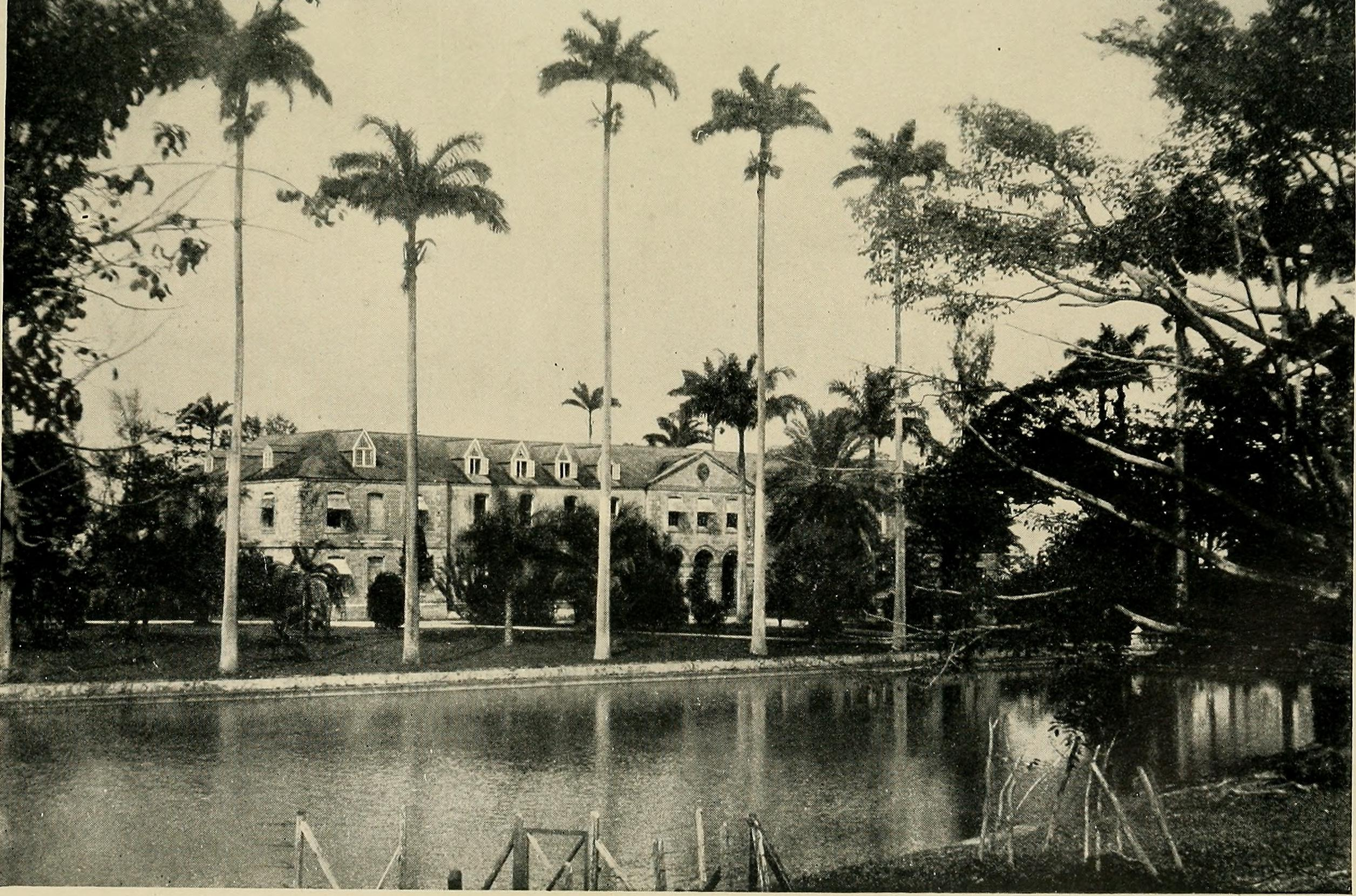
Codrington College

In 1713, Colonel Christian Lilly designed the original Codrington College building, on the model University of Oxford college, with four long sides of a building enclosing a quadrangle. However, due to financial constraints, only the southern portion of the plan was built, with the construction period lasting from 1714 to 1743. The main building is constructed of coral stone. The design includes a central portico with a pediment and three high arches sitting between a chapel and dining hall with a bust of Christopher Codrington. The chapel has an altar configured with a vaulted ceiling and panelled with ebony, lignum vitae, and cordia wood.

The campus also includes the Principal's Lodge. Originally, the Consett plantation great house, it was a large building but simply designed in three chambers. The impressive porch is carved coral stone and original, carved Jacobean balustrades have survived through a building fire. The building is now used as a library and for study space.

The campus is entered via road lined with specimen trees of varyious species, including giant silk cotton, whitewood or white cedars, mahogany and others. An ornamental lake is fed by a natural spring.

== Academics ==
The college now offers a small number of undergraduate and graduate diplomas and degrees, both for those planning to join the Anglican Church as priests and for lay members.

=== Undergraduate studies ===
Diploma in Theological Studies. This two-year program is designed for lay people who are leaders in their church. The part-time programme includes six modules taken over two years. The courses are available in either a traditional face-to-face format or in an online format with asynchronous content and synchronous online sessions with the facilitator. Courses include systematic theology, the Old Testament, the New Testament, history of Christianity, Christian ethics and comparative religion. The subsequent certificate is awarded by Codrington.

Licentiate in Theology. The licentiate degree (L.Th) is designed to prepare individuals to become Anglican priests. Entrance requirements range from a high school diploma through to a previous university degree. A wide range of courses is offered in this programme. The degree is awarded by the University of the West Indies.

Bachelor of Arts in Theology. The BA (Theology) degree is also designed to prepare individuals to become Anglican ministers. Students may opt for a three-year program or a four-year programme and the entry requirements are the same as entry to the Faculty of Humanities and Education of the University of the West Indies, Cave Hill Campus, being basically high school graduation or community college/associate degree credentials. A wide range of courses is offered in this programme. The degree is awarded by the University of the West Indies.

Minors in Theology. It is also possible to take a minor in theology in one of three foci: Biblical Studies, Historical & Pastoral Studies, or Systematic & Religious. The degree is awarded by the University of the West Indies.

Diploma in Pastoral Studies. The Student Handbook mentions a Diploma in Pastoral Studies. It appears that the diploma provides the professional training not included in the BA Theology or Licentiate in Theology, though the handbook states that "candidates may offer some of the above [diploma] courses for the L.Th. or B.A. Theology". Courses in this diploma include homiletics, pastoral studies, spirituality, and stewardship.

=== Graduate studies ===
Master of Philosophy (M.Phil.) and Doctor of Philosophy (Ph.D.) degrees in theology are also available. The main areas of study at this level are biblical studies, church history and theology, pastoral and liturgical studies, and systematic theology and philosophy. Entry into these programmes would require, inter alia, a bachelor's degree for the Master's programmes, and a master's degree for the doctoral programme, or equivalent preparation, usually in theology. These degrees are awarded by the UWI.

== Administration ==
As noted in the history section above, responsibility for the Codrington Estate passed from the Society to local hands. This is in the form of the Codrington Trust. The Trust, therefore, is responsible for the continued development of the bequest. There are seven members of the Trust governing body, five appointed by the Church and two appointed by the Minister (the Codrington Trust Act does not specify which Minister but a current trustee is from the Ministry of Social Care, Constituency Empowerment & Community Development).

The College Board is responsible for the leadership of the college. The board consists of 11 members, including the principal, a staff representative, a student representative, a UWI representative and a person nominated by the Minister. Most of the others are members of the clergy.

Codrington College is led by the Principal, currently the Rev. Dr. Michael Clarke. He is assisted by a Dean, the Warden/Chaplaincy and the Registrar.

== Principals ==
- The Rev. Mark Nicholson, President (1797–c.1821, title from 1801)
- The Rev. J. H. Pinder (1830–1835)
- The Rev. Henry Jones (1835–1846)
- The Rev. Richard Rawle (1847–1864)
- The Rev. W. T. Webb (1864–1884)
- The Rev. A. Caldecott (1884–1885)
- Canon Frederick Meyrick (1886)
- The Rev. Herbert Bindley (1890–1910)
- The Rev. Arthur Anstey (1910–1918)
- The Rev. Canon John C. Wippell (1918–1945)
- The Rev. A. H. Sayer (1945–1955)
- The Rev. Jonathan Graham, C.R. (1955–1957)
- The Rev. Anselm Genders, C.R. (1957–1965)
- The Rev. William Wheeldon, C.R. (1965–1966)
- The Rev. Godfrey Pawson, C.R. (1966–1969)
- The Rev. Martin Garrison (1969–1970)
- The Rev. Dr. Kortright Davis (1970–1971 (Acting))
- The Rev. Dr. Sehon Goodridge (1971–1982)
- Prof. Canon Noel F. Titus (1983–2005)
- The Rev. Dr. Ian Rock (2005–2015)
- The Rev. Dr. Michael Clarke (2015–present)

== Notable alumni ==
- Canon Michael W. H. Harris, Archdeacon of Brooklyn in the Episcopal Diocese of Long Island, N.Y.
- Alfred Berkeley, bishop of Barbados
- Stephen Cumberbatch, archdeacon
- John Holder, bishop of Barbados and archbishop of the West Indies
- Thomas Nisbett, first black priest of the Church of England in Bermuda
- Ewen Ratteray, bishop of Bermuda
- Frederick Streetly, archdeacon of Tobago
- Alfred A. Thorne, Mayor and human rights activist
- Cuthbert Woodroffe, archbishop of the West Indies
- Philip Wright, bishop of Belize

== See also ==
- University of the West Indies, Cave Hill Campus
- Samuel Jackman Prescod Institute of Technology
- Barbados Community College
- Erdiston Teachers' Training College
