= Henry Harris Brown =

English portrait artist

Henry Harris Brown RP (29 December 1864 – 12 July 1948) was an English artist best known for his portraits of English clergy, aristocrats and American and Canadian industrialists.

== Early life ==
Brown was born on 29 December 1864 in Northampton, England. He was the son of Lily and Henry Brown. His brother was Arthur Barrie Brown.

== Career ==
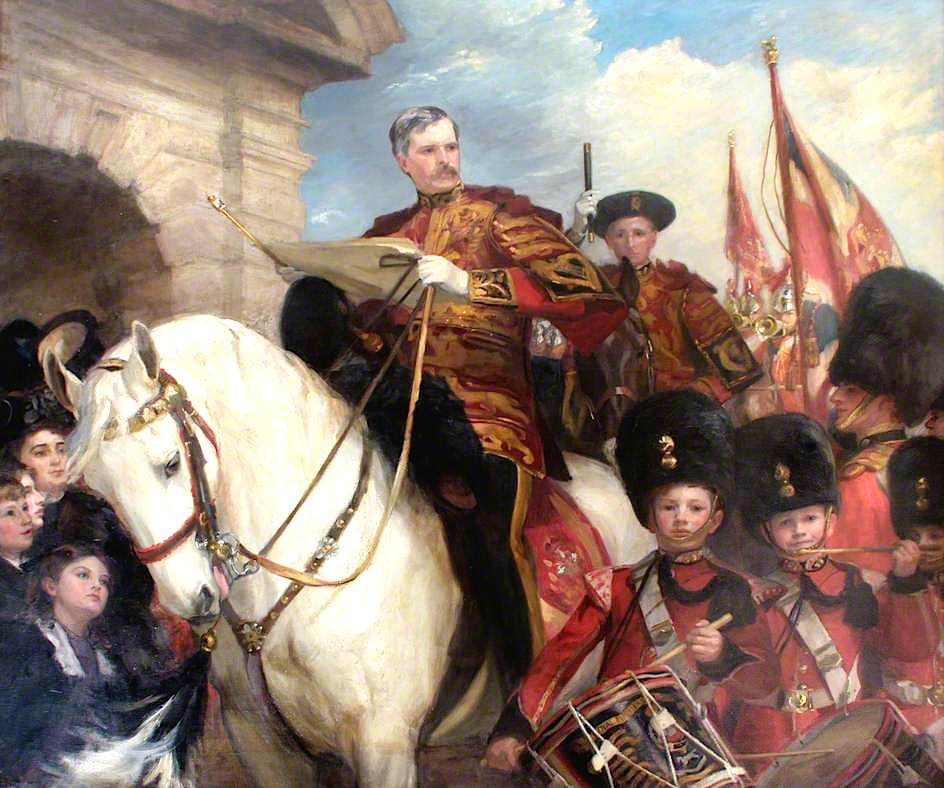
Proclamation of the Accession to the Throne of His Majesty King George V at Dublin, June 1911

Brown, who is sometimes credited as H. Harris Brown, studied at the Académie Julian in Paris under William-Adolphe Bouguereau and Tony Robert-Fleury, and exhibited at the Paris Salon and the Royal Academy from 1888. He was a member of the Royal Society of Portrait Painters of London and was an original member of the National Society of Portrait Painters. Brown was a contemporary of the Scottish painter John Henry Lorimer, and showed alongside John Singer Sargent, George Henry, Hugh Glazebrook, Sir George Reid.

Today, his works appear in the university collections of Queen's University Belfast, Exeter College, Oxford, Emmanuel College, Cambridge, Trinity College, Cambridge, Christ Church, Oxford. They also appear in several prominent properties, including Thirlestane Castle, Guildhall, Bath, National Gallery of Ireland, Museo Horne (Brown donated his 1908 painting of Herbert Horne to the museum in 1933), and at National Trust properties, including Castle Ward. He is represented at the National Collection of the Luxembourg Gallery in Paris by his portrait of Mrs. Boyd of Glastry.

=== Exhibitions ===
In 1919, Knoedler Galleries on Fifth Avenue in New York City exhibited a number of his portraits, including those of Charles H. Sabin, Geraldine Miller Graham, (Note: Geraldine Pollock Graham (1901–1976) was the daughter of "California Oil King" William Miller Graham and the former Lee Eleanor "Birdie" Pollock of Paris, Kentucky. Geraldine was briefly engaged to Whitney Warren Jr., son of architect Whitney Warren. She later married Charles William Dabney Jr., Juilliard McDonald Jr., and Disney art director James Spalding Bodrero.) Colonel Bishop and Mrs. William A. Slater, Jr. of Washington (née Madeleine Allen of New York). At the time, The Studio described Brown's works to be "great feats of draughtsmanship, rich colouring, excellent pose and a character expressed in hands out of the ordinary. He is intensely interested not only in the actual hand, but in obtaining some attractive poses of the hands, making a beautiful picture in themselves."

In April 1922, an exhibition of fourteen portraits by Brown, thirteen of prominent men of Canada and one New York physician who was born in Nova Scotia, was held at the Fearon Galleries in New York City. Brown completed the portraits in Canada over thirty months, devoting more than a month to each individual. The sittings were held either at the subject's homes or in their offices. Among his portraits was of Canadian industrialist, Adam Brown, then 96 years old.

In January 1923, an exhibition of seventeen of his portraits was held at the Buffalo Fine Arts Academy (today known as the Buffalo AKG Art Museum) in Buffalo, New York. (Note: The exhibited portraits were of Dr. George David Stewart, President of the New York Academy of Medicine, Whitney Warren Jr. (son of architect Whitney Warren), W. Emlen Roosevelt (cousin of Theodore Roosevelt), Robert Garden (father of Miss Mary Garden), Edith O'Shaughnessy (wife of Nelson O'Shaughnessy, former U.S. Secretary to Embassy in Mexico during the Wilson administration), and John Elderkin. They also showed a painting Brown had done of Richard B. Angus, who donated Temple of the Mind by the Albert P. Ryder to The Buffalo Fine Arts Academy.) At the time, he had studios in Chelsea, London and at Carnegie Hall in New York City.

In 1926, another exhibition of Brown's portraits was held at the Vose Galleries in Boston, Massachusetts. At the time, Frank Warren Coburn, the critic for the Boston Herald, wrote "In Mr. Brown's case, as in that of several other visiting Britons, one is impressed with his technical boldness and vigor, which contrasts with the reserve, delicacy and beauty of some of the works of our best American artists. This man's color is less delicious than theirs; his rhythm of dark and light is less subtle. He has, however, style and daring such as you would expect of a painter of the imperialists."

== Portrait subjects ==
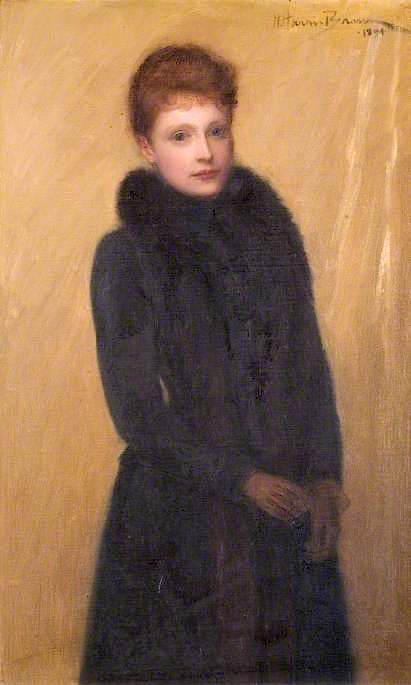
Portrait of Amy Stanton, 1894

=== Clergy ===
- The Right Rev. Edward Talbot
- The Right Rev. William Alexander
- The Right Rev. Mandell Creighton
- The Rev. William Jackson
- The Rev. Henry George Woods
- The Hon. Edward Lyttelton, D.D.

=== Aristocrats ===
- George Askwith, 1st Baron Askwith
- Sir William MacCormac, 1st Baronet
- Henry Ward, 5th Viscount Bangor
- Ian Maitland, 15th Earl of Lauderdale
- Grace Denison, Countess of Londesborough (née Lady Grace Fane)
- Ethel Meysey-Thompson, Lady Knaresborough (née Ethel Adeline Pottinger)

=== Others ===
- Richard B. Angus
- Herbert Horne
- Grenville Lindall Winthrop
- Charles Foxcroft
- Violet Jacob (née Violet Augusta Mary Frederica Kennedy-Erskine)
- Amelia Jackson

== Gallery ==
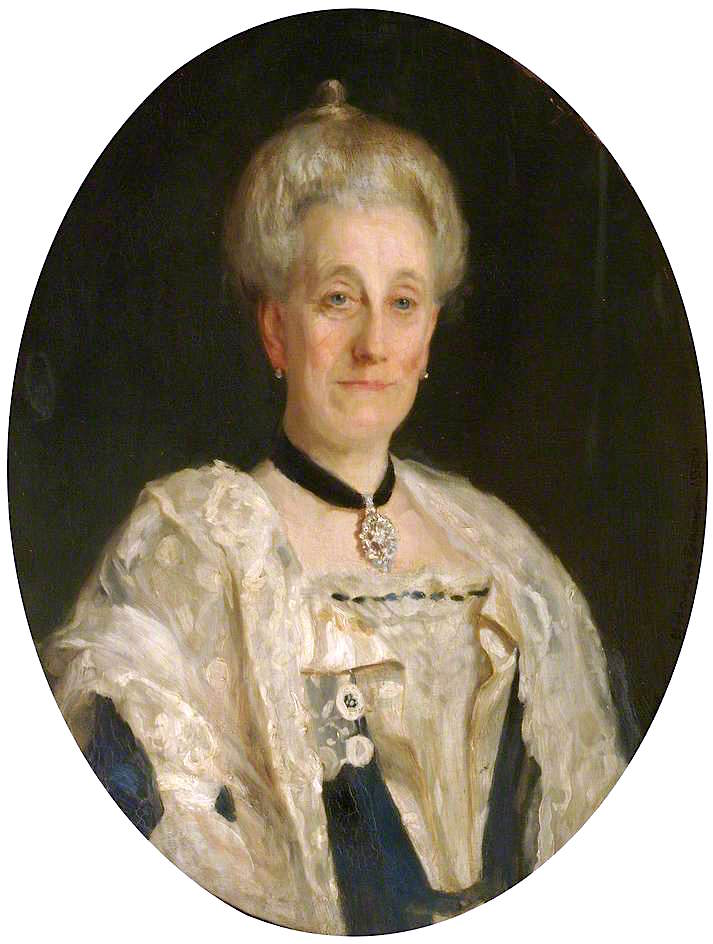
Amelia Jackson, 1889

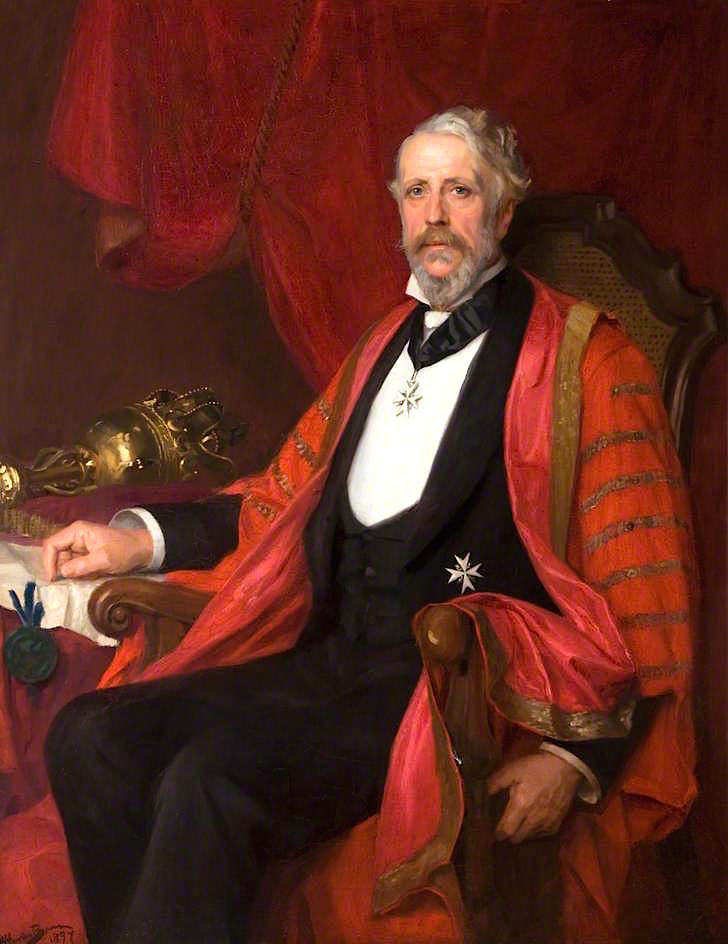
Sir William MacCormac, 1st Baronet, 1897

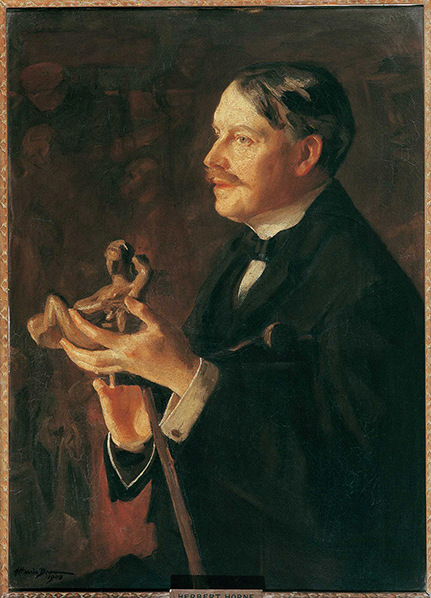
Herbert Horne, 1908

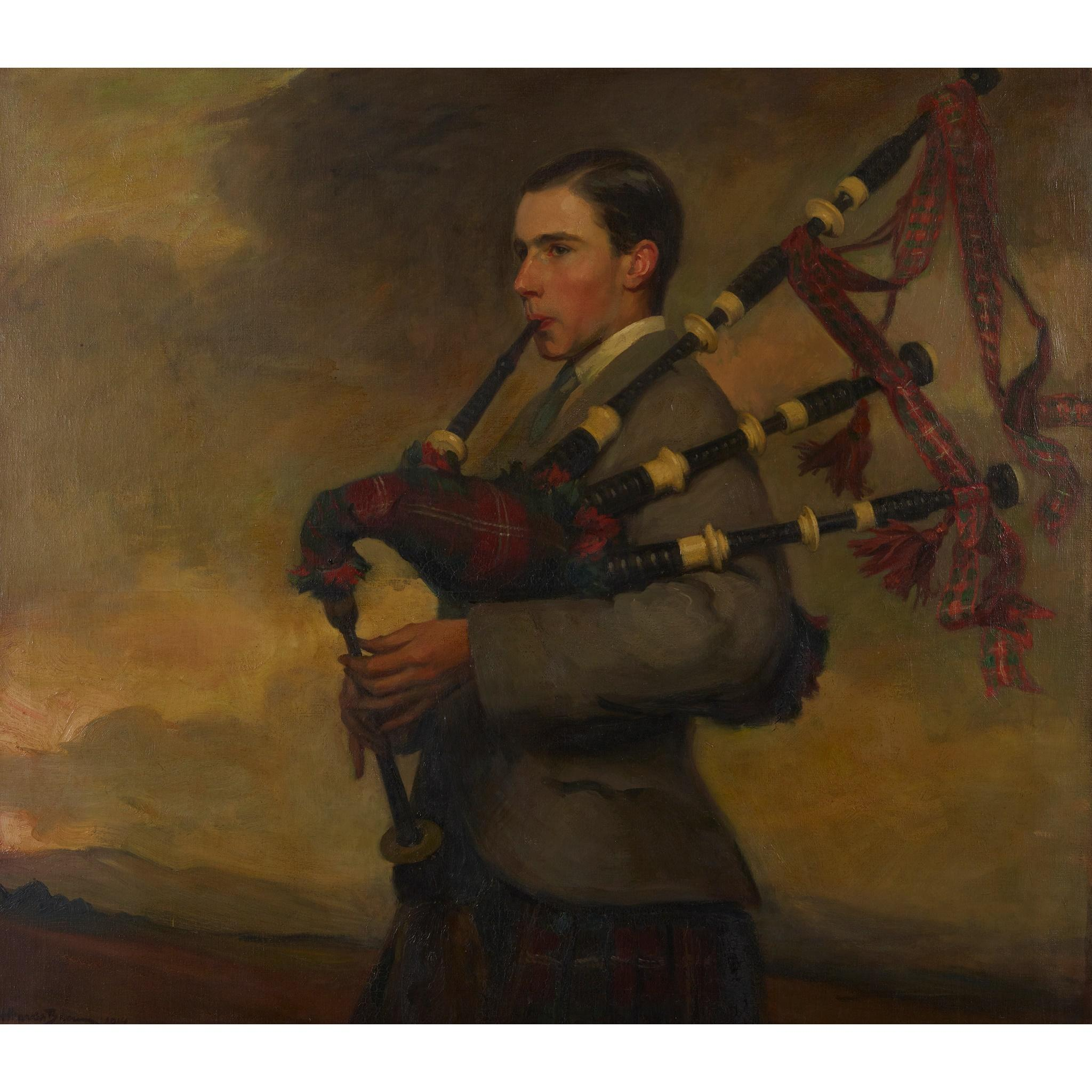
Capt. Alastair Wardrop Euing Crawford, 1914

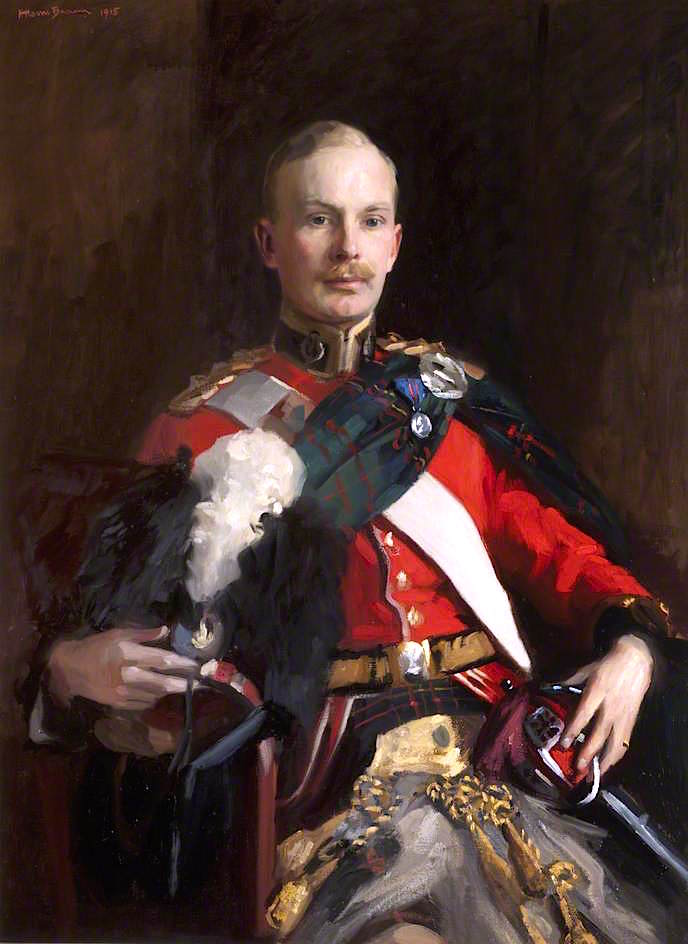
Ian Maitland, 15th Earl of Lauderdale, 1915

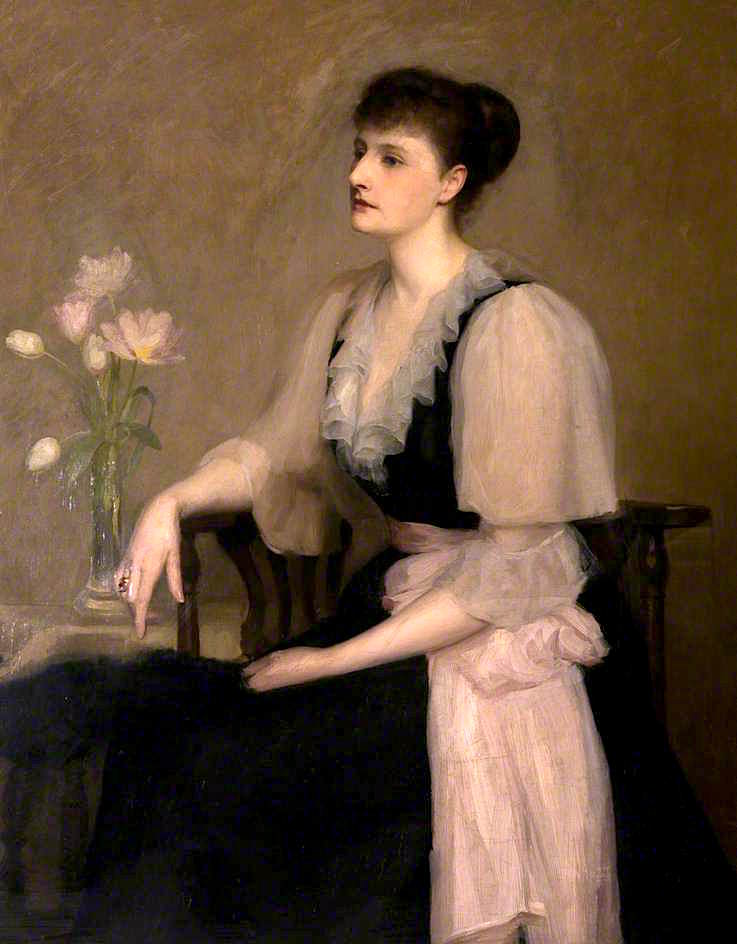
Violet Jacob

== Personal life ==
Brown died on 12 July 1948 at Princess Beatrice Hospital in London. At the time, he was living at The Vale, Chelsea, and was buried at St Luke's Churchyard at Duston, Northamptonshire, England.
