= Henry Tonks =

British painter (1862–1937)

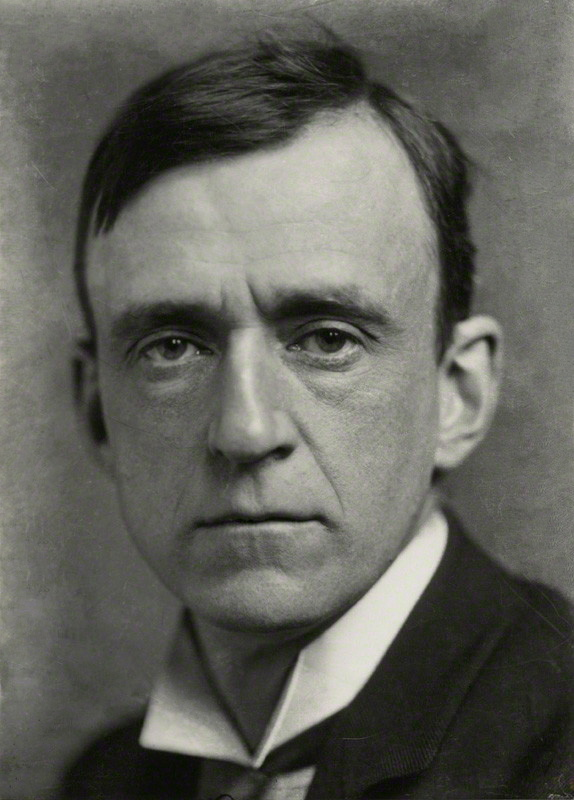
- Photograph by George Charles Beresford, 1902
- Born: 9 April 1862; Solihull, West Midlands
- Died: 8 January 1937 (aged 74); Chelsea, London
- Occupations: surgeon, draughtsman, painter

Henry Tonks, FRCS (9 April 1862 – 8 January 1937) was a British surgeon and later draughtsman and painter of figure subjects, chiefly interiors, and a caricaturist. He became an influential art teacher.

He was one of the first British artists to be influenced by the French Impressionists; he exhibited with the New English Art Club, and was an associate of many of the more progressive artists of late Victorian Britain, including James McNeill Whistler, Walter Sickert, John Singer Sargent and George Clausen.

== Early life and career as a surgeon ==
Tonks was born in Solihull. His family owned a brass foundry in Birmingham. He was educated briefly at Bloxham School, followed by Clifton College in Bristol, and then studied medicine at the Royal Sussex County Hospital in Brighton (1882–85) and the London Hospital in Whitechapel (1885–88). He became a house surgeon at the London Hospital in 1886, under Sir Frederick Treves. He was elected as a Fellow of the Royal College of Surgeons in 1888 and moved to the Royal Free Hospital in London. He taught anatomy at the London Hospital medical school from 1892.

== Artist ==
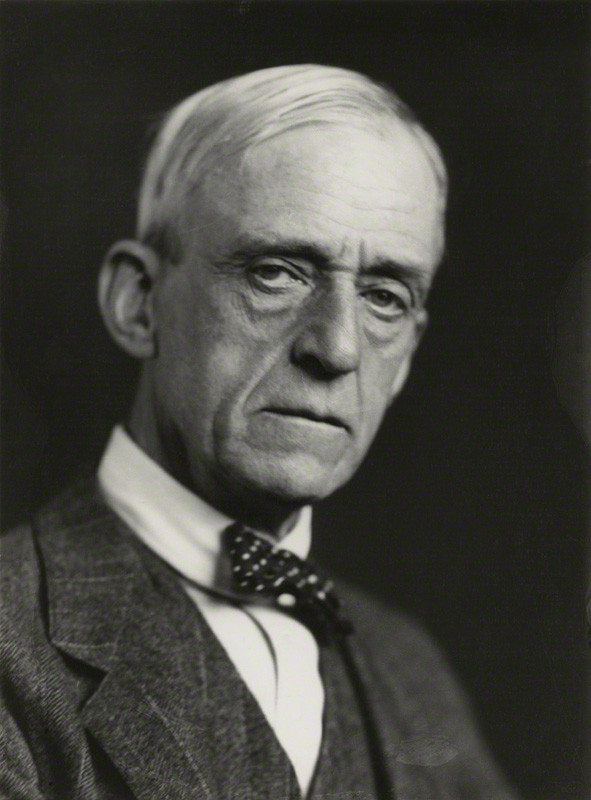
Photograph by George Charles Beresford, 1922

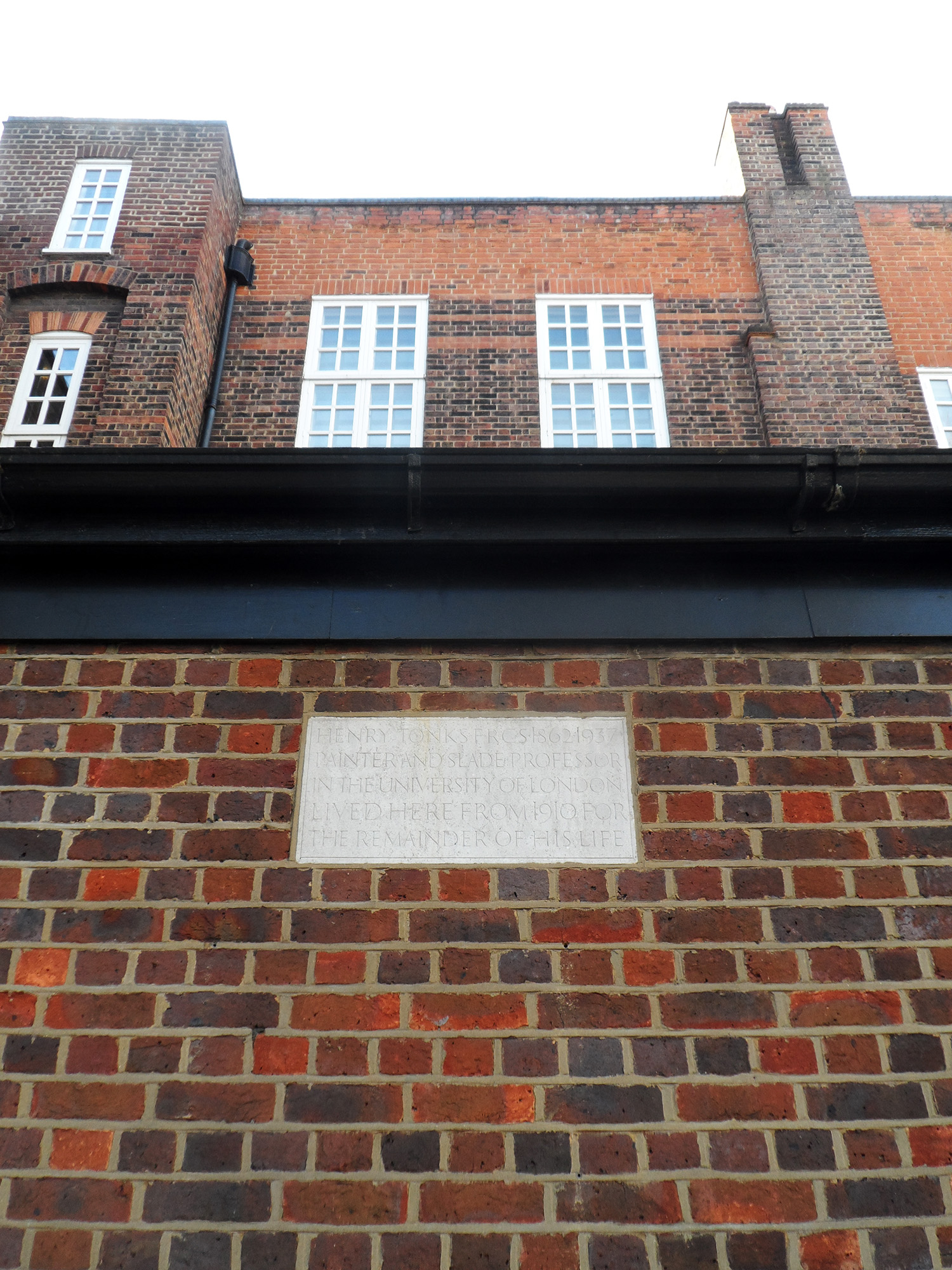
1, The Vale, Chelsea, his home from 1910 until his death in 1937

From 1888 he studied in the evenings at Westminster School of Art, under Frederick Brown. He exhibited paintings with the New English Art Club from 1891 and became a member of the Club in 1895.

Brown became Slade Professor of Fine Art at University College, London, in 1892, and Tonks started to teach at the Slade School of Fine Art. He became "the most renowned and formidable teacher of his generation". His pupils at the Slade included Winifred Knights, David Bomberg, Mark Gertler, Harold Gilman, Spencer Gore, Augustus John, Gwen John, Percy Wyndham Lewis, William Orpen, William Roberts, Isaac Rosenberg, Hester Gaskell Holland Gorst, Stanley Spencer Douglas Chandor and Rex Whistler. His sarcasm there drove F. M. Mayor's sister Alice to leave before completing her training. His student Paul Nash recalled Tonks's withering manner:

Tonks cared nothing for other authorities and he disliked self-satisfied young men ... His surgical eye raked my immature designs. With hooded stare and sardonic mouth, he hung in the air above me, like a tall question mark, moreover ... of a derisive, rather than an inquisitive order. In cold discouraging tones he welcomed me to the Slade. It was evident he considered that neither the Slade, nor I, was likely to derive much benefit.

From 1910 until his death, he lived at 1, The Vale, Chelsea, where he also had his studio.

== First World War ==
Tonks resumed his medical career in 1914, first at a prisoner of war camp in Dorchester, and then at Hill Hall in Essex. He made pastel drawings of Auguste Rodin and his wife, who were refugees. He served as a medical orderly at a British Red Cross hospital near the Marne in France in 1915, and joined an ambulance unit in Italy. He became a lieutenant in the Royal Army Medical Corps in 1916, and worked for Harold Gillies producing pastel drawings recording facial injury cases at the Cambridge Military Hospital in Aldershot and the Queen's Hospital, Sidcup – a contribution recognised in the exhibitions Faces of Battle at the National Army Museum in 2008 and Henry Tonks: Art and Surgery at the Strang Print Room of University College London in 2002. There is also information on him at Will Self's "Kafka's Wound".

He became an official war artist in 1918, and he accompanied John Singer Sargent on tours of the Western Front. In August 1918 they both witnessed a field of wounded men near Le Bac du Sud, Doullens, which became the basis for Sargent's vast canvas, Gassed. Tonks went to Archangel in Russia in 1919 as a war artist with a British expeditionary force.

== Later life ==
Tonks succeeded Frederick Brown as Slade Professor of Fine Art from 1918 to 1930, although he initially turned down the appointment in favour of Walter Sickert, only taking it up when Sickert declined it. Further post-war students included Thomas Monnington, William Coldstream, Helen Lessore and Philip Evergood. Lessore, who founded the Beaux Arts Gallery with her husband Frederick Lessore in 1923, described him as "a towering, dominating figure, about 6ft. 4in. tall, lean and ascetic looking, with large ears, hooded eyes, a nose dropping vertically from the bridge like an eagle's beak and quivering camel-like mouth".

He retired in 1930, and declined the offer of a knighthood. An exhibition of his work was held in London at the Tate Gallery in 1936, only the second retrospective at the Tate for a living British artist. He died at his home in Chelsea.

== Gallery ==
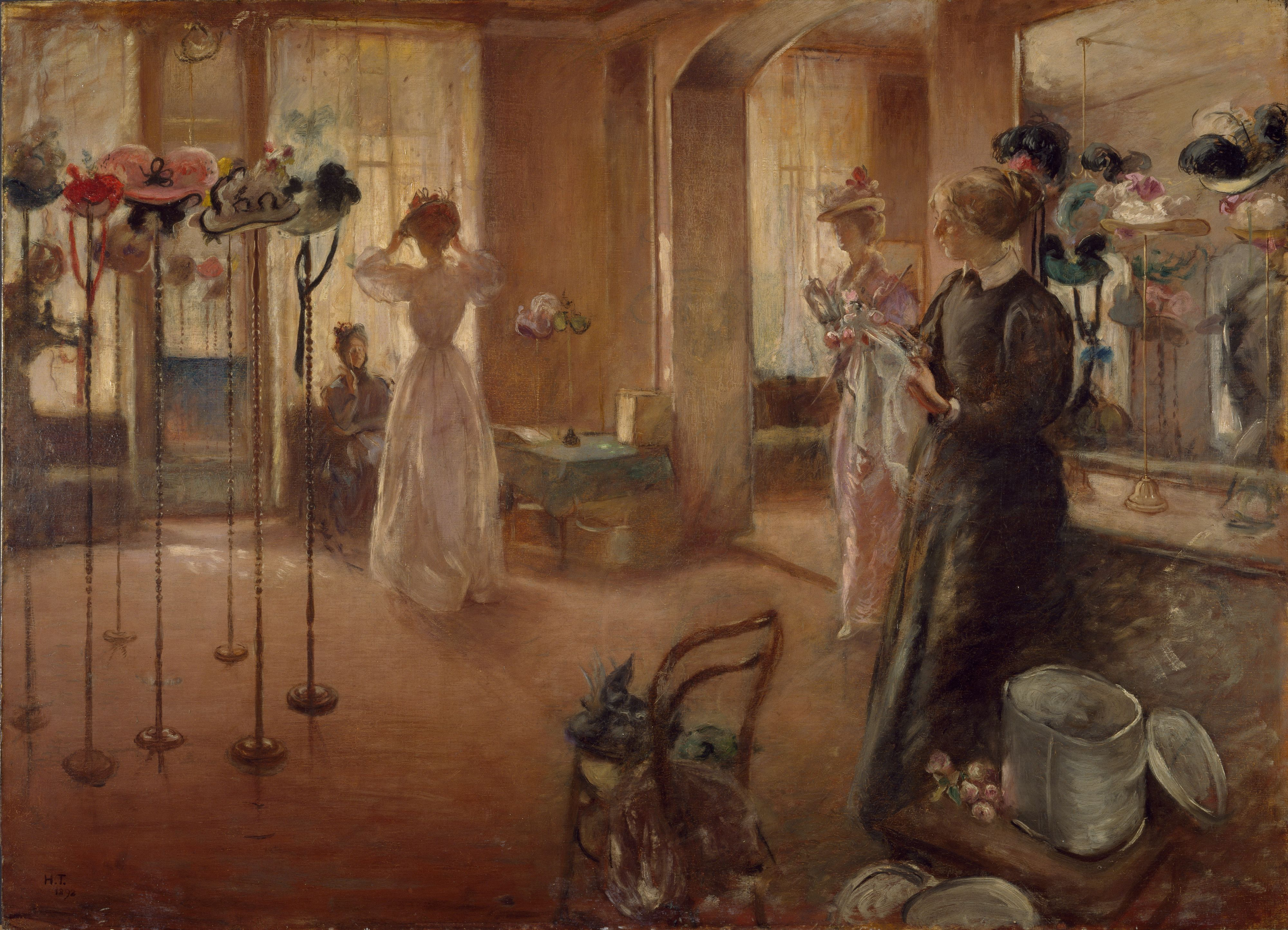
The Hat Shop (1892), oil on canvas

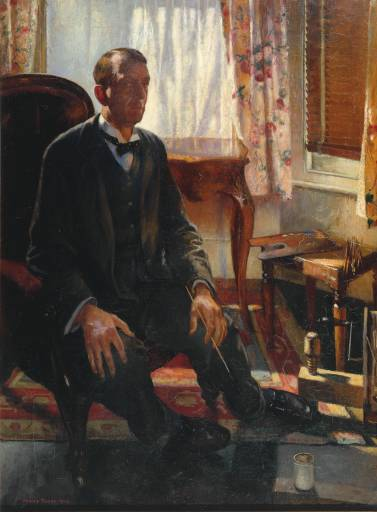
Self-portrait (1909)

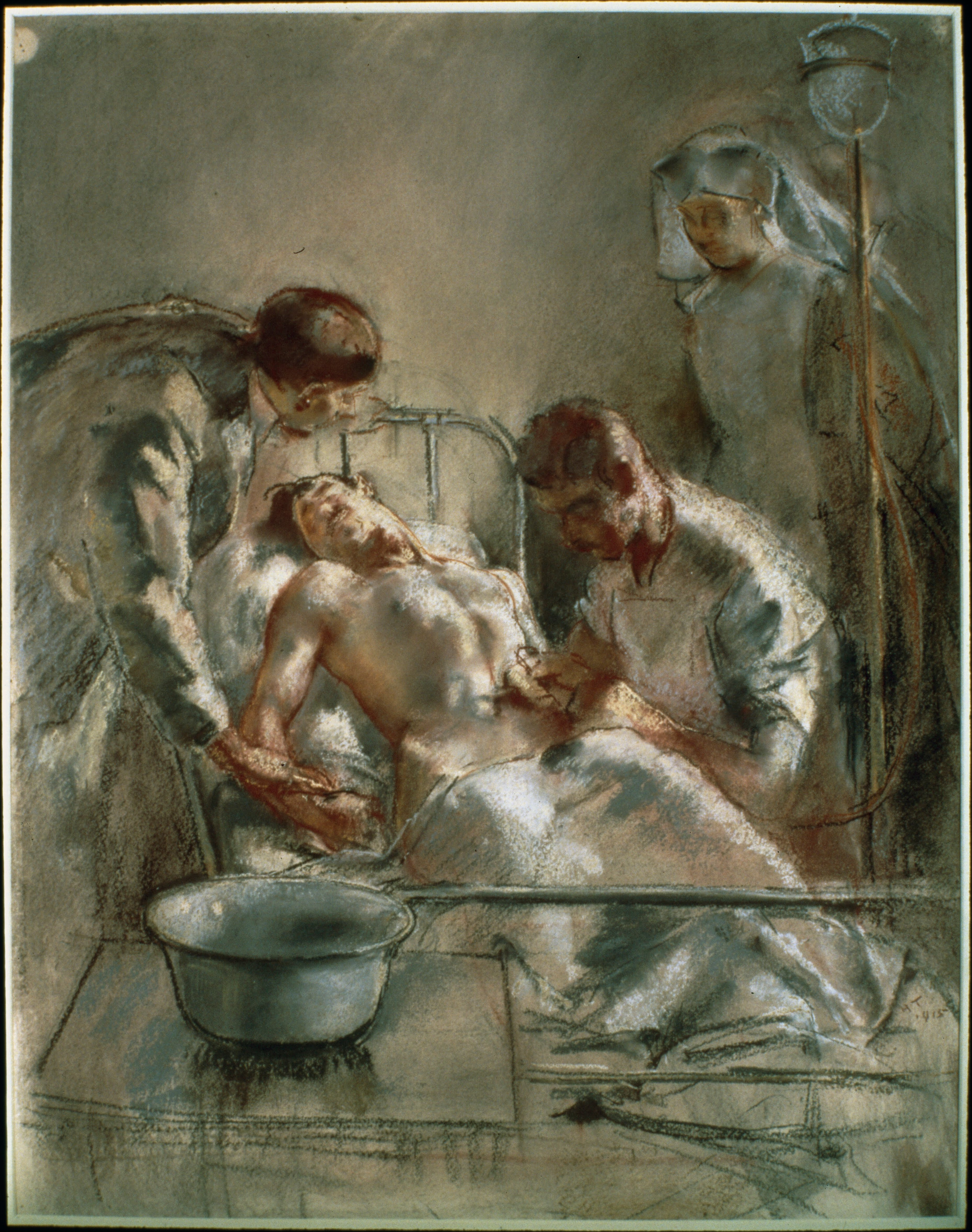
Saline Infusion: An incident in the British Red Cross Hospital, Arc-en-Barrois, 1915 (1915)

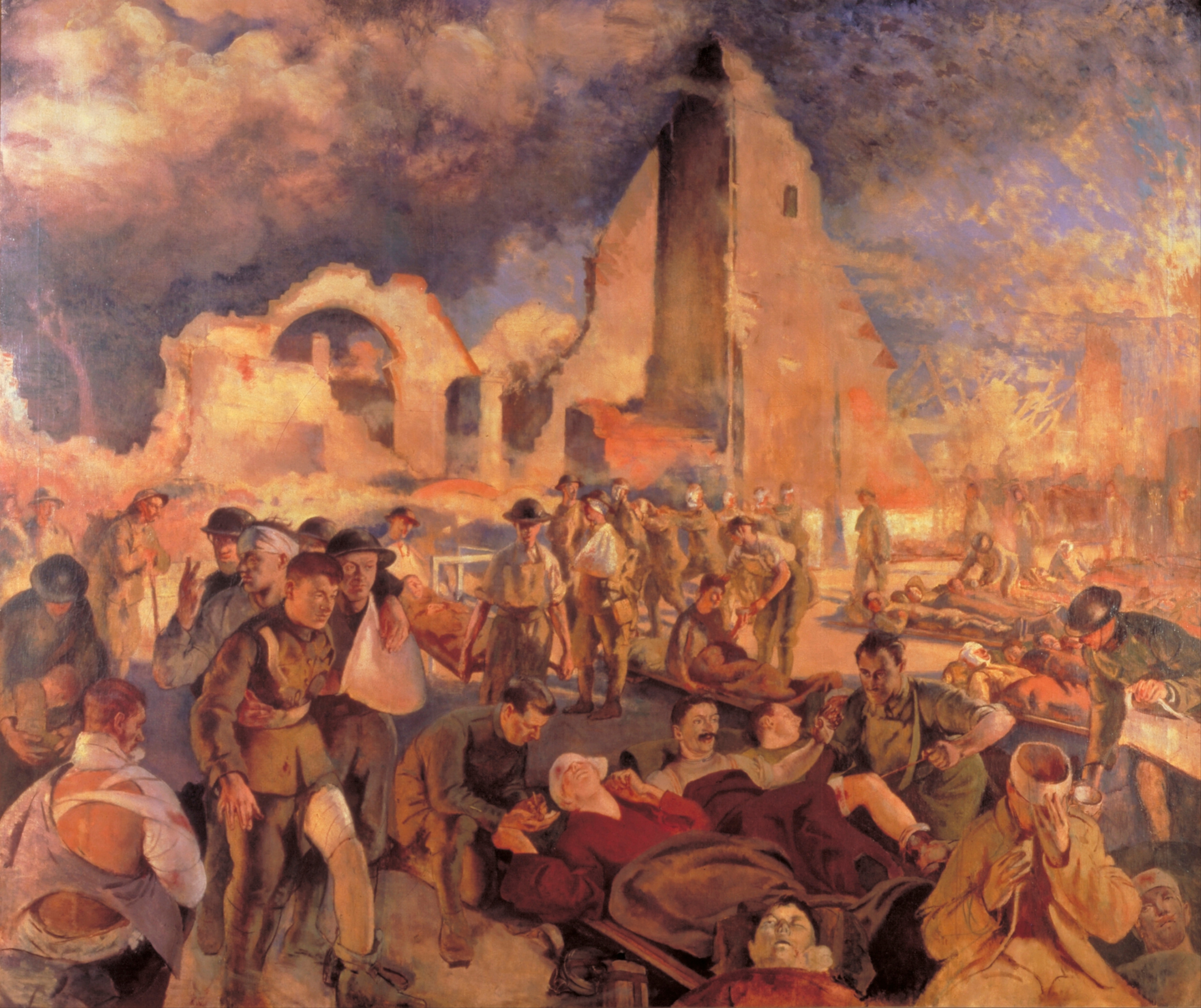
An Advanced Dressing Station (1918), oil on canvas

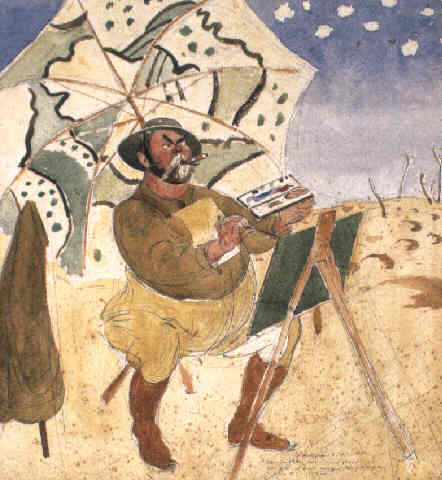
John Singer Sargent painting (c. 1918)

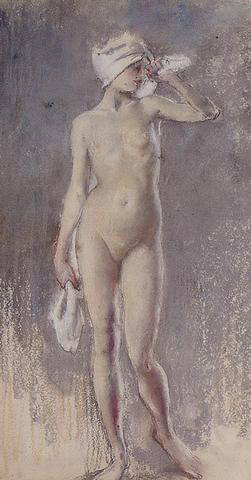
Standing figure (c.1918)

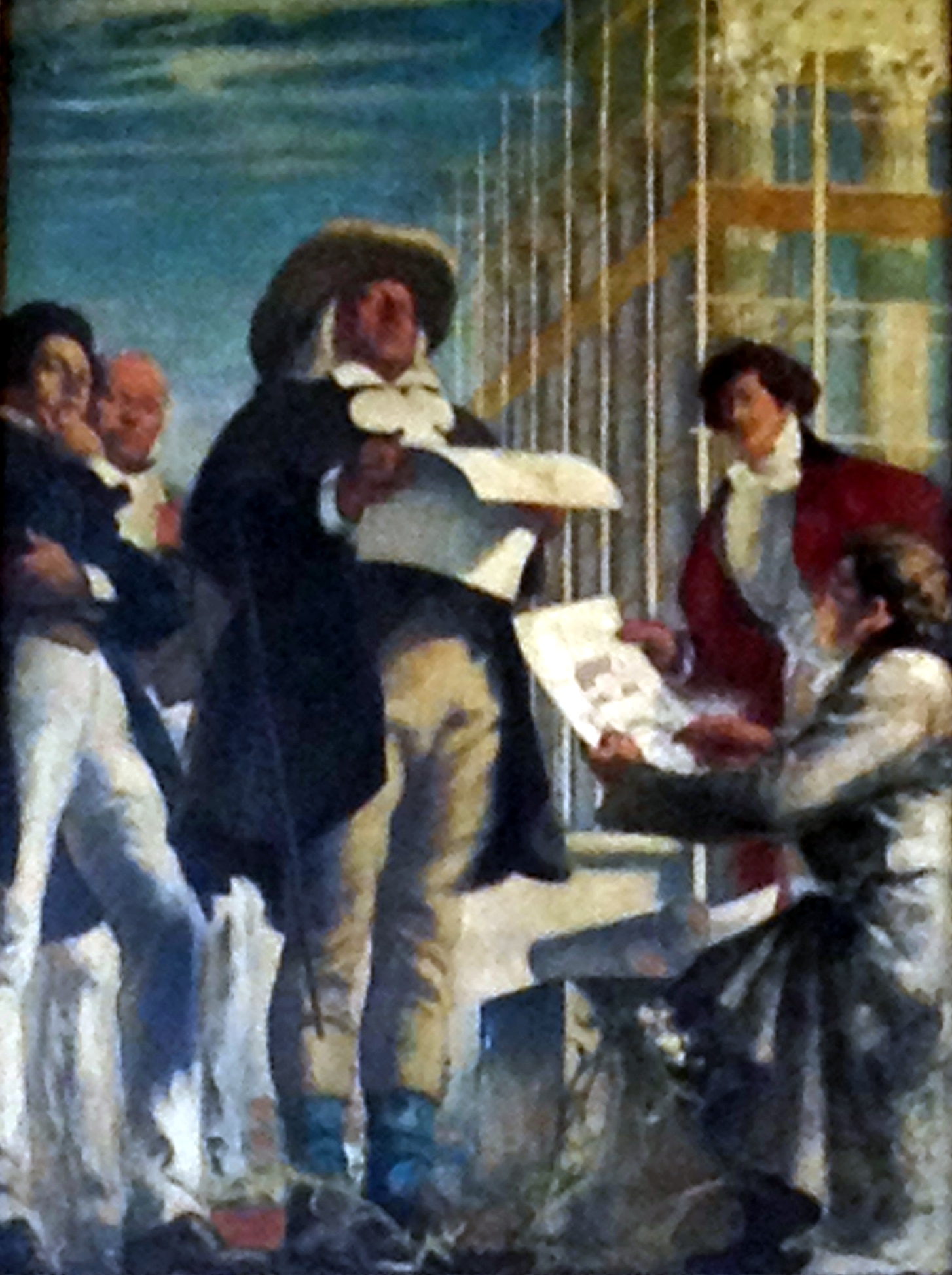
The Four Founders of UCL (c. 1923)

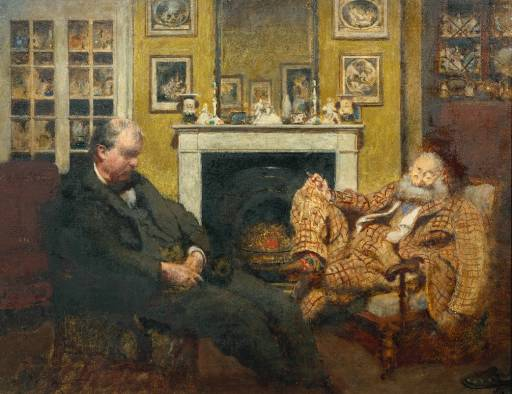
Sodales: Mr Steer and Mr Sickert (1930)
