= Hester Gaskell Gorst =

British writer and artist

- Born: Hester Gaskell Holland; 25 September 1887; Wavertree, Liverpool, U.K.
- Died: 18 October 1992 (age 105); London, U.K.
- Other names: H. H. Gorst, Hester Holland Gaskell, Hester Holland
- Occupations: Writer, artist

Hester Gaskell Gorst (née Holland; 25 September 1887 – 18 October 1992) was a British writer and artist. Her horror stories are often anthologized.

== Early life and education ==
Hester Gaskell Holland was born in Wavertree, Liverpool, the daughter of Walter Holland and Alice Franklin (née Wray) Holland. Her father was a steamship owner; her mother was born in India to British parents. She attended the Slade School of Fine Art from 1904 to 1906, working with painter Henry Tonks, with further studies in Brussels.

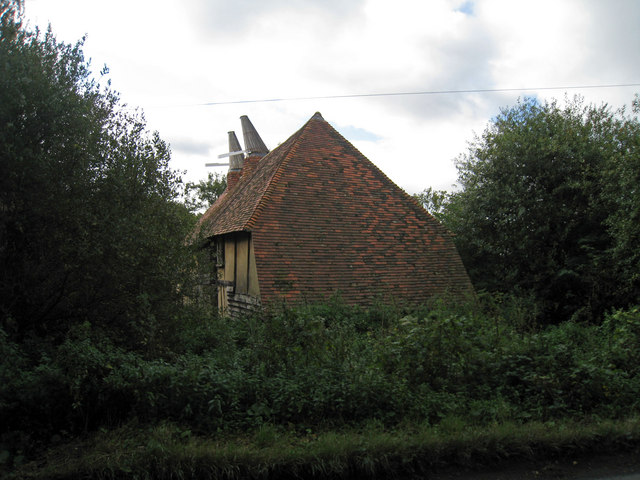
Oast House at Catts Place, Mile Oak Road, Paddock Wood, Kent; Gorst and her husband lived at Catts Place from 1918 until 1973.

== Career ==
Gorst was an artist and sculptor. In 1931 she exhibited her "delightfully fanciful work" at the Cooling Galleries in London. Paintings by Gorst were featured in the Stock Exchange Art Society Exhibitions in 1952 and 1953. She made a bust of John Brunt in 1961. In 1979, she had a one-woman exhibition of her paintings in London, partly organized by her granddaughter Jessica Gorst-Williams, and appeared on the Russell Harty television program. She was a social acquaintance of Wyndham Lewis.

== Publications ==
Gorst contributed a poem to a memorial tribute to Lord Kitchener in 1916. Her short fiction has been reprinted regularly, usually in collections of horror stories. "Dorner Cordaianthus" (1925) is about a paleobotanist who discovers and plants an ancient fertile seed; it was first collected in Christine Campbell Thomson's anthology Grim Death (1932) and also appears in Roots of Evil: Beyond the Secret Life of Plants (1976) and Hortus Diabolicus (2022). "The Doll's House" (1933) appeared in The Virago Book of Ghost Stories (1987, edited by Richard Dalby), when she was a hundred years old. Her 1936 haunted-house story "The Scream" was adapted for television in 1953.

- "Dorner Cordaianthus" (1925, short story)
- "Second Sight" (1927, short story)
- "The Door" (1932, short story)
- "In the Park" (1932, short story)
- "Shapes" (1932, short story)
- "High Tide" (1933, short story)
- "Littlesmith" (1933, short story)
- "The Doll's House" (1933, short story)
- "The Library" (1933, short story)
- "The Scream" (1936, short story)
- Weekend for Henry (novel)
- There's Always Oneself (novel)
- A Man Must Live (1939, novel)
- "To Churchill" (1944, poem)
- Under the Circumstances (1944, novel)

== Personal life ==
Holland married Elliot Marcet Gorst in 1914. He was a lawyer and founder of the Tunbridge Wells Poetry Society. They lived at Catts Place in Paddock Wood. He died in 1973, and she died in 1992, in London, at the age of 105.
