= Winifred Knights =

British artist (1899-1947)

- Born: Winifred Margaret Knights; 5 June 1899; Streatham, London, England
- Died: 7 February 1947 (aged 47); London, England
- Education: Slade School of Art; The British School at Rome
- Known for: Painting
- Spouse: Walter Thomas Monnington

Winifred Margaret Knights (5 June 1899 – 7 February 1947) was a British painter. Amongst her most notable works are The Marriage at Cana produced for the British School at Rome, which is now in the Museum of New Zealand Te Papa Tongarewa and her winning Rome Scholarship entry The Deluge, which is now held by Tate Britain. Knights' style was much influenced by the Italian Quattrocento and she was one of several British artists who participated in a revival of religious imagery in the 1920s, while retaining some elements of a modernist style.

== Biography ==
Winifred Knights was born in the South London suburb of Streatham, the eldest of four children of Mabel, née Murby, a former theatrical singer and embroiderer, and Walter, the secretary of a sugar plantation company. From 1912, Knights attended James Allen's Girls' School in Dulwich where she showed an early artistic talent, winning both gold and silver medals with the Royal Drawing Society in 1915. She pursued formal art training at the Slade School of Fine Art from 1915 to 1917 and again from 1918 to 1920, under the tutelage of Henry Tonks and Fred Brown. During World War One, Knights was traumatised after witnessing the Silvertown explosion at a TNT processing works in January 1917, which led to a break in her studies where she would take refuge at her father's cousins' farm in Worcestershire. This became the subject of her 1918 painting The Potato Harvest.

At the end of the War, returning to the Slade, Knights began to draw upon personal themes to inspire her work including war and peace, town and country and the social status of men and women. In 1919, Knights painted Leaving the Munitions Works and, jointly, won the Slade Summer Composition Prize for A Scene in a Village Street with Mill-hands Conversing featuring a figure of a female trade unionist. The following year she became the first woman in England to win the prestigious Scholarship in Decorative Painting awarded by the British School at Rome with her critically acclaimed painting The Deluge. Her 1919 painting, Leaving the Munitions Works, 1919 was bought by the artist Allan Gwynne-Jones. In 1920 she became engaged to fellow student Arnold Mason and moved to Italy to complete her scholarship, living at Anticoli Corrado, a small village south of Rome. In 1922, the Tate purchased an Italian landscape painted by Knights.

Knights remained in Rome until 1925. The relationship with Mason ended and she married fellow Rome Scholar Thomas Monnington on 23 April 1924. Her first major work in Rome, The Marriage at Cana, was completed in 1923. The painting toured internationally before being relegated to storage at the Tate and then later to an inaccessible stairwell in the British School's London office. Due to its large size, British public collections, including the Tate and Fitzwilliam Museum in Cambridge, did not accept offers to add the painting to their permanent collections. Eventually in 1958, the painting was gifted from the British School in Rome to the National Art Gallery of New Zealand. Monnington was awarded several high-profile commissions which Knights assisted him with, both by posing as a model and by preparing and painting parts of the finished works.

Knights returned to the Slade in the years 1926 and 1927 and exhibited at both the Imperial Gallery in Kensington and the Duveen Gallery. Her 1927 exhibition included The Santissima Trinita, depicting a pilgrimage to Vallepietra, which some consider her masterpiece. The painting is privately owned and is rarely exhibited but was greatly praised when first shown. In the period 1928 to 1933 Knights executed the altarpiece Scenes from the Life of St Martin of Tours for the Milner Memorial Chapel at Canterbury Cathedral. The cathedral authorities did not appreciate Knights' slow, careful approach to the work and she was inconsolable when the triptych was relegated to the crypt of the church. It has since been restored to the body of the cathedral. In 1929 Knights was elected to the New English Art Club, but never exhibited with them.

In 1933 Stephen Courtauld and his wife Virginia bought Eltham Palace. They commissioned Knights and Monnington, who collaborated with the Swedish interior designer Rolf Engströmer and the Italian decorator Peter Malacrida, to work on the decoration of the interiors of the building. Knights died from a brain tumour in London in 1947 at the age of 47. During the late 1930s Knights spent considerable time on preparatory sketches for a large commission, The Flight into Egypt, but ceased working during the World War II. She resumed painting after the conflict but died suddenly, from an undiagnosed brain tumour, at a hospital in London on 7 February 1947. No newspaper published an obituary of Knights and it was not until 2016 that a major retrospective of her work was held at the Dulwich Picture Gallery.

== The Deluge ==
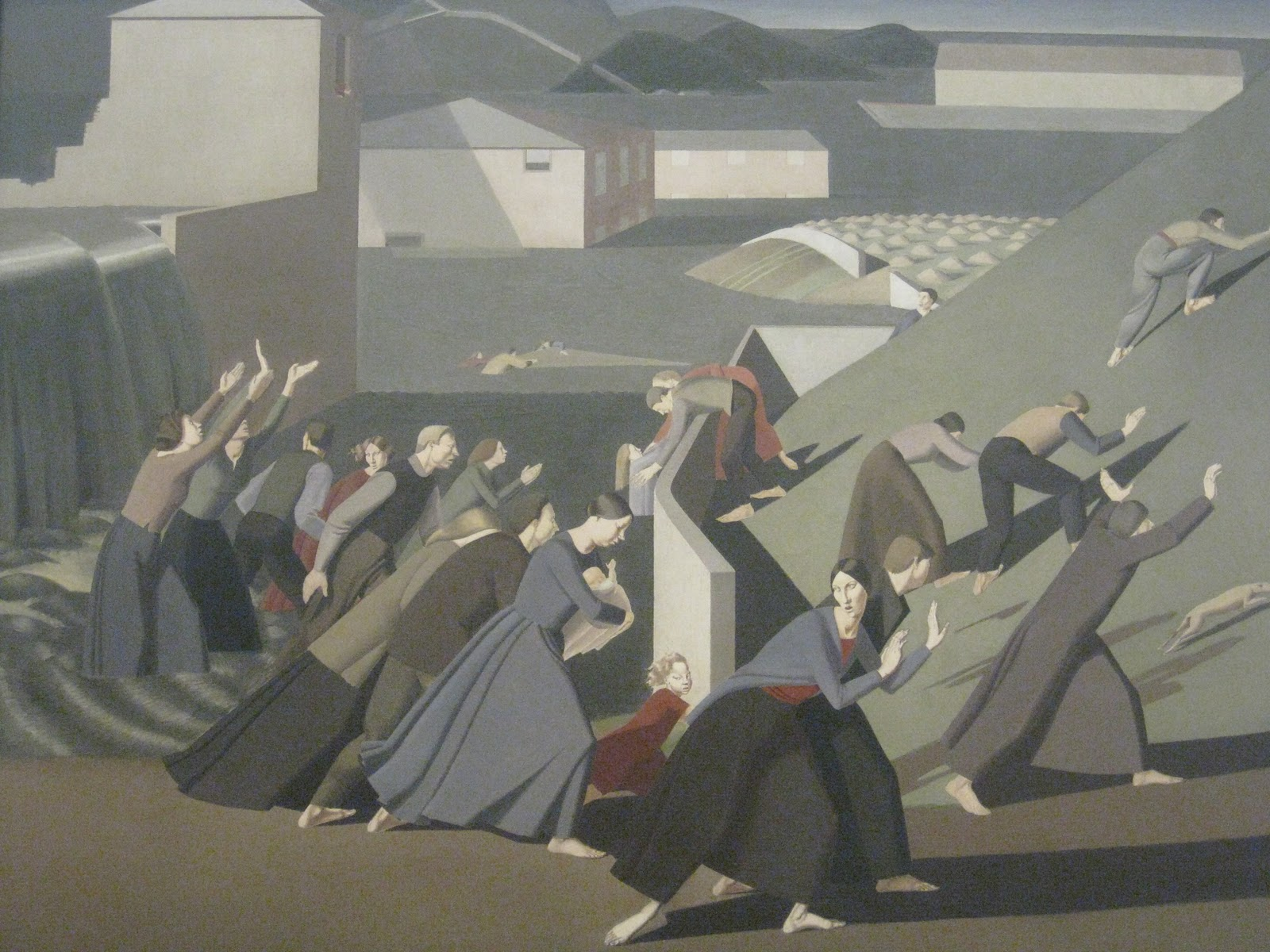
The Deluge (1920) by Winifred Knights

To compete for the Rome Scholarship students were asked to paint a scene of The Deluge, in oil or tempera measuring 6 X 5 feet and which had to be completed in a period of eight weeks (commencing 5 July). The panel of ten judges included George Clausen, John Singer Sargent, Philip Wilson Steer, and David Young Cameron. Knights' depiction of the deluge went through several versions, including a foreground scene of Noah and his family loading the animals onto the Ark. However, as time ran out Knights was forced to simplify her composition with people fleeing the rising waters and escaping to higher ground, Noah's Ark can be seen in the distance to the right. Knight's mother modelled for the central figure carrying a baby and her then partner Arnold Mason modelled the male figure beside her and the man scrambling up the hill. Knights portrayed herself as the figure to the centre right of the foreground. The Flood water was modelled on Clapham Common. The Deluge was shown in the British Pavilion at the Paris Exhibition of 1925.

== Dress ==
Knights was known for her distinctive dress, a stylised version of nineteenth century Italian peasant costume, characterised by a loose ankle-length skirt, a plain buttoned blouse, a wide brimmed black hat and coral necklace and earrings. Several of Knights's paintings include self-portraits, including The Deluge and The Marriage at Cana. Knights can be seen in the foreground of The Deluge and is the third figure on the left hand side, seated at the table in The Marriage at Cana. In both paintings Knights depicts herself wearing distinctive dress.

== Bibliography ==
- Sacha Llewellyn, Winifred Knights, Lund Humphries and Dulwich Picture Gallery, London 2016
- Winifred Knights, The British School at Rome/Fine Art Society plc/ Liss Fine Art, (exhibition catalogue) 1995
