= William Jackson (priest, died 1931) =

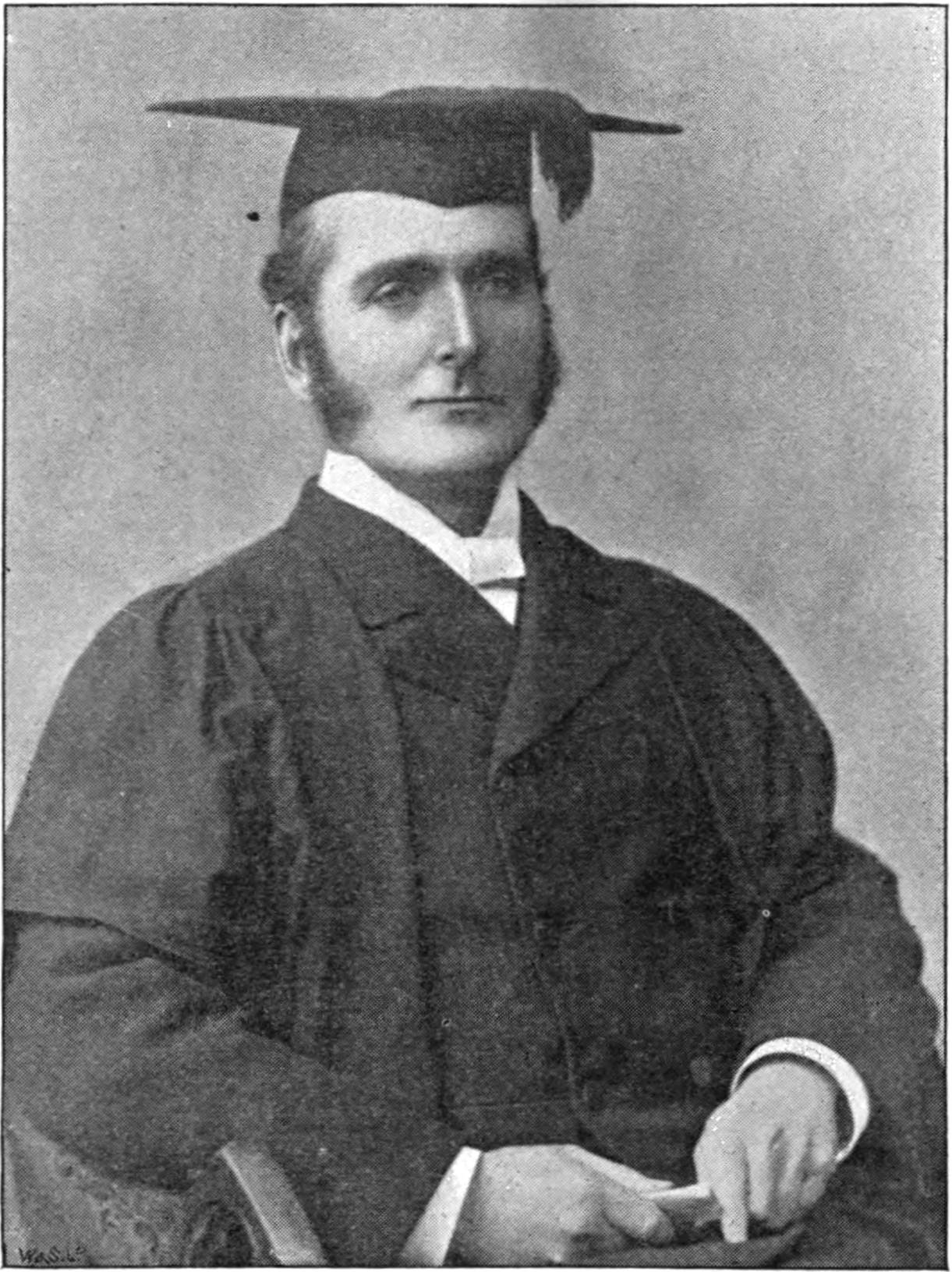
William Walrond Jackson

William Walrond Jackson (1838–1931) was the Rector of Exeter College, Oxford, from 1887 to 1913. He was born at the Port of Spain, Trinidad and was the eldest son of the Bishop of Antigua Walrond Jackson. He was educated at Codrington College, Barbados and Balliol College, Oxford, matriculating in 1856, graduating B.A. 1860 (M.A. 1863).

Jackson was elected as a Fellow of Exeter College in 1863, was Sub-Rector 1878–83 and honorary fellow from 1913. He was censor of the Oxford non-collegiate students from 1883 to 1887. He married Amelia Jackson in 1887. Jackson was the first Rector of the College who was not an Exeter undergraduate, and the last to be in holy orders.
