= Augustus Burke Shepherd =

British physician (1839–1885)

Augustus Burke Shepherd FRCP (1839–1885) was a Fellow of the Royal College of Physicians who later became the dean of St. Mary's Hospital, Paddington. Shepherd graduated from Brasenose College, Oxford with a B. Med. in 1865. He then became a doctor at St. Mary's, and was notable for delivering the Goulstonian Lectures in 1876. His parents lived in St. Leonard's on Sea. He married Amelia Staines (later Amelia Jackson). Shepherd had a tendency to drink too much and died at the age of 46.
