= Elm Park Road =

Street in Chelsea, London

Coordinates: 51.4864°N 0.1767°W

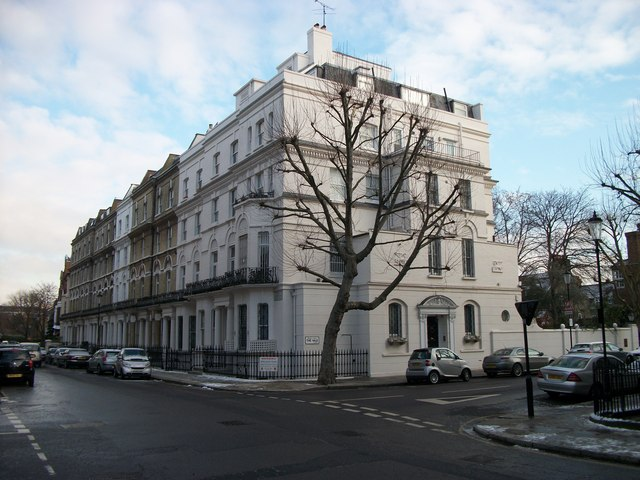
Elm Park Road at its junction with The Vale, 2010

Elm Park Road is a street in Chelsea, London. It runs roughly west to east from Park Walk, crossing Beaufort Street and The Vale, among others.

In 1875, Chelsea Park House was demolished, and Park Road was extended across the empty site to Park Place (now Park Walk), and the street was renamed Elm Park Road. Most of the houses were built from 1875 to 1882, and much was designed by George Godwin.

== Notable residents ==
- Paul Jacob Naftel lived at No. 76
- Hon Isabel Monckton, daughter of 8th Viscount Galway, and wife of John King, Baron King of Wartnaby
