= Amelia Jackson =

British musician (1842–1925)

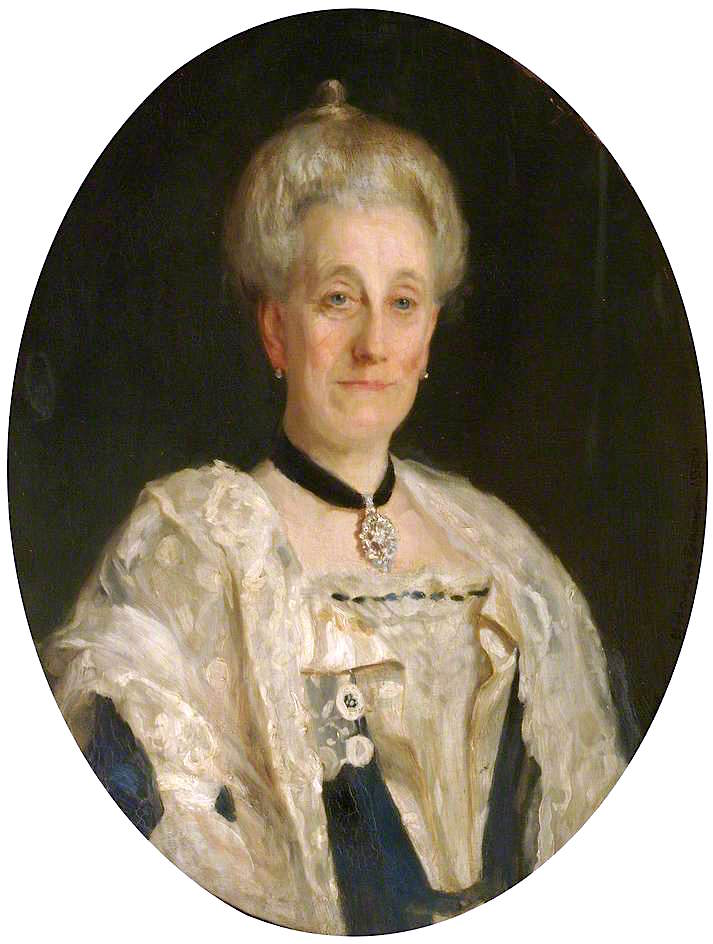
Portrait of Mrs. Jackson, by Henry Harris Brown, 1889

Amelia Jackson (née Staines, formerly Shepherd; 1842 – 1925) was an accomplished musician and the wife of Rector W. W. Jackson of Exeter College, Oxford. Her bequest to the college enabled the creation of a fund to provide graduate scholarships and financial aid to students.

== Biography ==
Amelia Jackson, born Amelia Staines, was the only child of Francis William Staines, a wealthy London merchant. She was brought up in St Leonards-on-Sea, Sussex. She married Augustus Burke Shepherd, a London physician, who died in 1887. She subsequently married William Walrond Jackson Jr shortly after he became Rector of Exeter College, Oxford in 1887. They had no children but Amelia was a keen musician and an active participant in the social and cultural life of the college. Amelia inherited a fortune both from her father and her first husband, the bulk of which she left to the college. Her money now supports graduate studentships and junior members suffering hardship; she is the greatest benefactor to Exeter College in modern times.

After her death in 1925 her husband wrote a book on the life of Amelia Jackson which was privately printed and is now available in the Bodleian Library.

== Life in Exeter College ==
Amelia Jackson was ideally suited to the responsibility that her second marriage had brought on her. She was intelligent and cultivated and took a lively interest in all the activities of the college. As a keen amateur musician, she attracted to her drawing room many fine musicians. She entertained every undergraduate to Sunday lunch at least twice a year. Her interest in the Chapel services and the choir extended to her presenting the chapel with a new hymnbook which was widely considered an improvement on the previous edition. Amelia not only possessed leadership skills but her personality commanded respect and affection from those around her. She once told her husband that her mother had predicted ‘that nature had formed her to be the head of a large establishment’. As Exeter's First Lady she blossomed in the role of the Rector's wife, providing a focus for the social and cultural life of the college and, in so doing, won the respect and affection of all who knew her.

== Life after Exeter College ==
After the Rector resigned in 1913, the Jacksons lived at 18 Bardwell Road, north Oxford, where they continued to receive visitors. They also spent much of their time after 1913 in their house in the Lake District, Singleton Park, entertaining visitors with the same characteristic warmth. Amelia's consideration for people from every walk of life, whether they were distinguished colleagues of her husband's or the kitchen staff, was one of her endearing characteristics; all were treated with kindness and civility.

In 2013 Exeter College created the Amelia Jackson Society to thank and recognise those alumni and Friends who have pledged a legacy gift to the college. The Society members meet annually for talks by Fellows and Amelia Jackson Scholars (postgraduate students), a luncheon, and a recital by members of the Chapel Choir.

== Amelia Jackson Fund ==
=== Senior Studentships ===
- 1947: Roger Bannister
- 1948: G. R. Allen
- 1949: A. F. Walls
- 1951: Kenneth Simmonds
- 1974: Andy Ross
- 1980: Nigel Glen
- 1986: Rachel Falconer
- 1991: Michael Efroimsky
- 1997: I Brunton
- 1998: Jonathan Davis, Ruth Griffin
- 2000: D. J. Flowerdew, Bonnie Latimer
- 2001: O. D. Lan, T. Green
- 2003: Liam Condon, Micahel A Floyd, Michael J Hugman, Eleni Lianta
- 2006: Dirk-Jan Omtzigt
- 2008: Rachel Harland, Shuo Qu, Nauman Shah
- 2009: Karen Collis
- 2010: Ursula Hackett
- 2011: Akshat Rathi and Matthew McCarthy-Rechowicz
- 2012: Georgios Anastasiades, Francisca Gale, Francis Hutton-Williams, Michael Mayo, Toni Weis and Steffan Blayney
- 2013: Emily Dolmans, Myriam Frenkel, Elizabeth Houghton, Max Muir

=== Other ===
- 1998: Isla Gilmour
- 2001: John Walter
