= Walter Thomas Monnington =

English painter

Sir Walter Monnington
- Born: 2 October 1902; Westminster, London, England
- Died: 7 January 1976 (aged 73); London, England
- Education: Slade School of Fine Art
- Known for: Painting, design

Sir Walter Thomas Monnington PRA (2 October 1902 – 7 January 1976) was an English painter, notable for several large murals, his work as a war artist and for his presidency of the Royal Academy.

== Early life and education ==
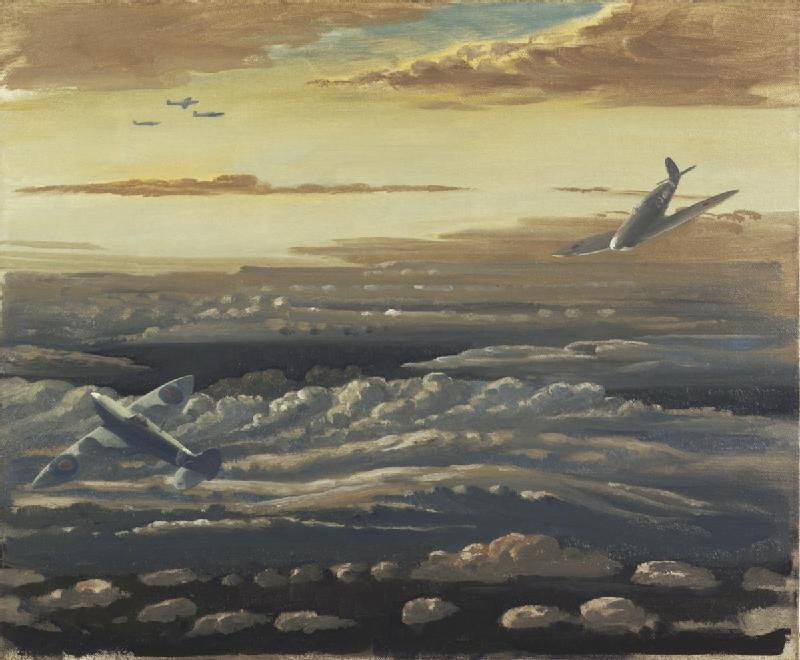
Clouds and Spitfires (1943) (Art. IWM ART LD 3767)

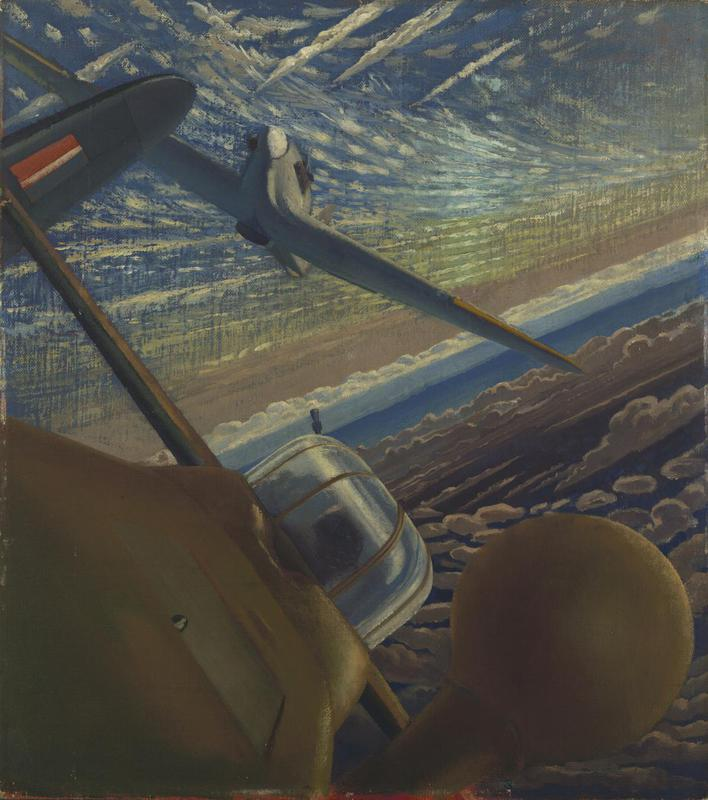
Fighter Affiliation Halifax and Hurricane aircraft co-operating in action (Art. IWM ART LD 3769)

Tempests Attacking Flying-bombs (1944) (Art IWM ART LD 4588)

Monnington was the son of a barrister and although he was born in Westminster, London, he grew up in Sussex before spending time on a farm school at Ross-on-Wye. From 1918 to 1922, he studied at the Slade School of Fine Art and in 1922 won a three-year scholarship in Decorative Painting to the British School at Rome. In April 1924 Monnington married his fellow art student Winifred Knights. Whilst in Italy, he produced his first large work, Allegory which was purchased by the Contemporary Art Society and is now in the Tate collection.

From 1925 to 1937 Monnington lived in London where he taught part-time at the Royal College of Art and, until 1939, at the Royal Academy Schools. Throughout this time he was also working with a group of other artists, including George Clausen and William Rothenstein, on two major decorative schemes, one for the Bank of England and the other, between 1925 and 1927, for St. Stephen's Hall in the Palace of Westminster. In 1931 he completed Supper at Emmaus for a church in Bolton. Monnington also began to receive commissions for portraits including those of Stanley Baldwin and Earl Jellicoe amongst others. However, Monnington's finished portrait of Jellcoe was returned to him following objections from Countess Jellicoe, who took exception to the portrayal of her husband.

== World War II ==
In May 1939, Monnington joined the Directorate of Camouflage at Leamington Spa where he worked on camouflage designs for airfields and factories. He also, after a chance meeting with Barnes Wallis, contributed design improvements, now in the Victoria & Albert Museum, to a new heavy bomber aircraft then being developed which later became the Avro Lancaster. In 1943 Monnington, who had taken flying lessons before the war, wrote to the War Artists' Advisory Committee, WAAC, complaining of the lack of an aerial perspective among the works WAAC had so far commissioned. In November 1943, WAAC issued Monnington with the first of a series of full-time commissions that saw him flying with a training squadron in Yorkshire and with Mitchell bombers to Germany. The winter of 1944-1945 was spent in the Netherlands amongst the Second Tactical Air Force drawing mobile radar and radio units. The paintings Monnington produced of aerial warfare, and especially those such as Fighter Affiliation. from a perspective inside the aircraft, were to be among the most important such images in the WAAC collection.

== Post-war career ==
When the war ended, Monnington taught at the Camberwell School of Art from 1947 for four years and then at the Slade School of Art until 1967. His wife Winifred Knights died in 1947 and he married Evelyn Janet later the same year. He produced little new work until 1953 when he began a three-year commission to paint a fresco in Bristol. Monnington completed the ceiling of the conference hall in the new Council House, Bristol in 1956, with a design symbolizing modern science. Other notable works, including a 'Stations of the Cross' for Brede parish church, followed. Throughout the 1960s Monnington's work became more abstract and often based on geometric designs, for example his chapel ceiling for the University of Exeter. Following his appointment as president of the Royal Academy in 1966, he was knighted in 1967. Monnington was the first president of the academy to produce abstract art and was highly effective in the role doing much to restore the academy's ailing fortunes. He served as president until his death in London on 7 January 1976.

== Honours ==
- 1947 – Associate of the Royal Academy
- 1939 – Member of the Royal Academy
- 1957 – Fellow of University College London
- 1966 – President of the Royal Academy
- 1967 – Knighthood.

Cultural offices
Preceded by Sir Charles Wheeler	President of the Royal Academy; 1966–1976	Succeeded by Sir Hugh Casson
