= The Vale, Chelsea =

Street in Chelsea, London

Coordinates: 51.48572°N 0.17567°W

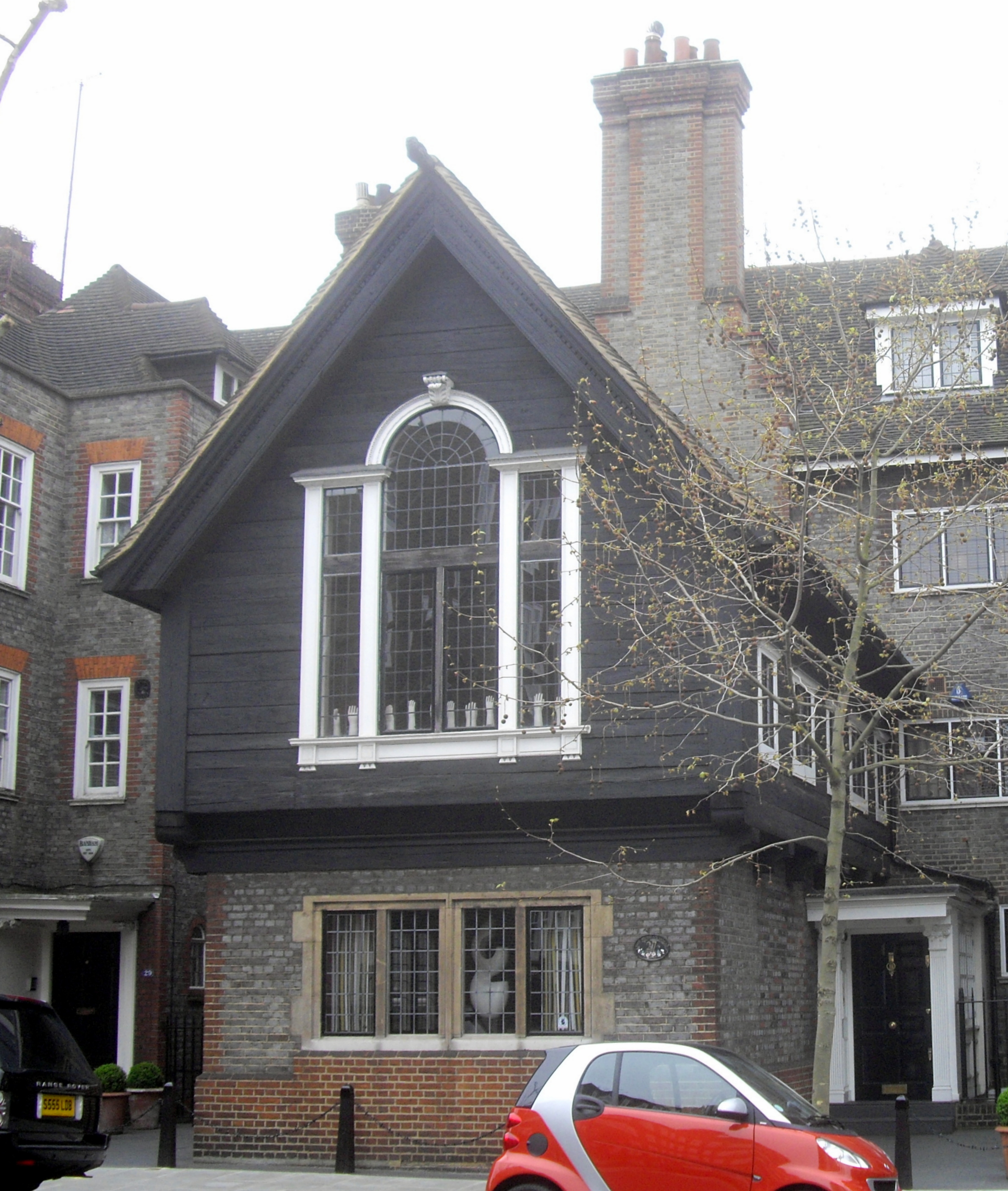
The Russian House, The Vale, 2012

The Vale is a street in Chelsea, London.

It runs roughly north to south, from a junction with Elm Park Road and Elm Park Gardens (effectively its northern continuation) to a T-junction in the south where it meets the King's Road.

In December 2022, it was reckoned to be the eighth most expensive street in the United Kingdom.

Most of the west side, 3-29 The Vale, is Grade II listed. This includes no 27, The Russian House, the facade of which is a Russian dacha built for a "turn-of-the-century exhibition" at The Crystal Palace between 1890 and 1900. After the exhibition it was bought by the architect F. E. Williams and was subsequently relocated, transformed and extended from c. 1911 to c. 1913. It was listed for sale in 2016 at £16 million.

Henry Tonks, the artist and surgeon, lived at no 1 from 1910 until his death in 1937. His 1928–1929 painting Saturday Night in the Vale was bought by Sir William Orpen in 1929 and bequeathed to Tate in 1932. It depicts George Moore reading aloud from his novel Aphrodite in Aulis to an audience of St John Hutchinson, his wife Mary Hutchinson, Philip Wilson Steer, and Tonks.
