= 1988 hurricane season =

1988 hurricane season may refer to:

- 1988 Atlantic hurricane season
- 1988 Pacific hurricane season
