= 1988 Bangladesh cyclone =

Category 3 North Indian tropical cyclone in 1988

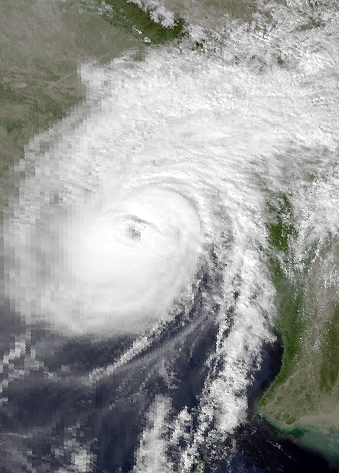
- Satellite image of the cyclone nearing peak intensity on November 29

Meteorological history
- Formed: November 21, 1988
- Dissipated: November 30, 1988

Extremely severe cyclonic storm
- 3-minute sustained (IMD)
- Highest winds: 215 km/h (130 mph)
- Lowest pressure: 955 hPa (mbar); 28.20 inHg

Category 3-equivalent tropical cyclone
- 1-minute sustained (SSHWS/JTWC)
- Highest winds: 205 km/h (125 mph)

Overall effects
- Fatalities: 6,240
- Damage: ≥$13 million (1988 USD)
- Areas affected: Bangladesh, East India
- IBTrACS
- Part of the 1988 North Indian Ocean cyclone season

The 1988 Bangladesh cyclone (designated as Tropical Cyclone 04B by the Joint Typhoon Warning Center) was one of the worst tropical cyclones in Bangladesh history. Striking in November 1988, the tropical system exacerbated the catastrophic damage from what was then considered the worst floods in Bangladesh's history. The tropical cyclone originated from a disturbance that developed within the Strait of Malacca on November 21. Tracking slowly westward, the initial tropical depression reached tropical storm status in the Andaman Sea. On November 26, the storm reached an intensity equivalent to that of a modern-day severe cyclonic storm and subsequently turned northward. Gradually intensifying as it had previously, the tropical cyclone reached peak intensity with winds of 125 mph (201 km/h) as it was making landfall near the Bangladesh–India border on November 29. Although the storm retained strong winds well inland, it was last monitored over central Bangladesh as a moderate cyclonic storm-equivalent on November 30.

The brunt of the tropical cyclone's damage was inflicted upon coastal areas of Bangladesh and West Bengal. A total of 6,240 people were killed as a result of the storm, with 5,708 in Bangladesh and 538 in West Bengal. Many of the deaths were a result of the destruction of homes or electrocution after strong winds toppled power poles across the region. Along the coast of Bangladesh, strong storm surge caused heavy infrastructure damage and contributed in wiping out an estimated 70% of all harvestable Bangladeshi crops, with an estimated 200,000 tonnes (220,000 tons) of crops being lost. Widespread power outages cut telecommunications across Bangladesh; in Dhaka, Bangladesh's capital city, debris-laden streets paralyzed traffic while electrical outages caused water shortages.

== Meteorological history ==
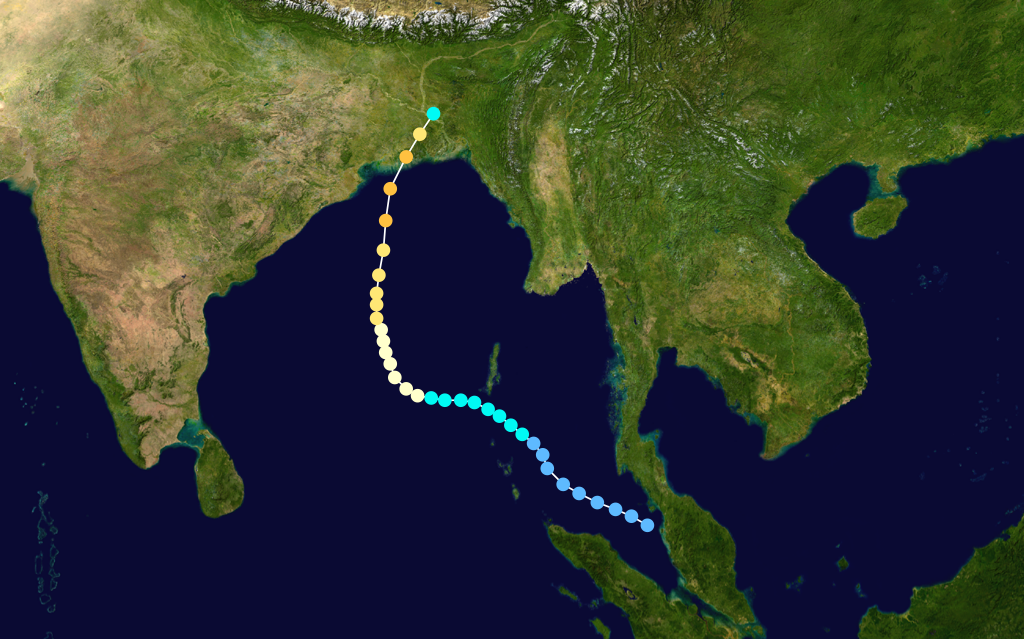
Map plotting the storm's track and intensity, according to the Saffir–Simpson scale Map key Saffir–Simpson scale Tropical depression (≤38 mph, ≤62 km/h) Tropical storm (39–73 mph, 63–118 km/h) Category 1 (74–95 mph, 119–153 km/h) Category 2 (96–110 mph, 154–177 km/h) Category 3 (111–129 mph, 178–208 km/h) Category 4 (130–156 mph, 209–251 km/h) Category 5 (≥157 mph, ≥252 km/h) Unknown Storm type Tropical cyclone Subtropical cyclone Extratropical cyclone, remnant low, tropical disturbance, or monsoon depression

During November 1988, weather patterns over the Bay of Bengal were dominated by the winter monsoon, leading to lower atmospheric pressures over the region and the conglomeration of moisture across the area. The genesis of the 1988 Bangladesh cyclone was preceded by floods that occurred over the Malay Peninsula as a result of a monsoon trough redeveloping over the region. By 18:00 UTC on November 21, a low-pressure area within the Strait of Malacca was sufficiently organized such that the Joint Typhoon Warning Center (JTWC) issued a Significant Tropical Weather Advisory; thus, the JTWC began closely monitoring the newly developing storm. Over the next few days, the tropical depression tracked west-northwestward into the Andaman Sea. (Note: The Joint Typhoon Warning Center's rating scale consisted of tropical depression, tropical storm, and typhoon.) The inchoate storm quickly organized during this period, and convection about the storm's center intensified. These developments caused satellite intensity estimates to increasingly indicate a stronger storm, which in turn prompted the JTWC to issue a Tropical Cyclone Formation Alert at 18:30 UTC on November 23. At 06:00 UTC the following day, the JTWC upgraded the system to tropical storm status (or modern-day Cyclonic Storm-equivalent) and thus designate the storm as Tropical Cyclone 04B; however, the storm's "best track" listing, which details refined cyclone positions and is subject to revision, indicates that the storm reached tropical storm intensity six hours earlier.

After reaching tropical storm status, the system took on a slower and more westerly path across the Bay of Bengal. Gradually strengthening, the system attained typhoon intensity (or modern-day Severe Cyclonic Storm-equivalent) at 00:00 UTC on November 26. Shortly after reaching this strength, the cyclone began to curve northward, rounding the western periphery of a subtropical ridge centered over Indochina. Due to the ridge's broad size, the tropical cyclone was steered generally due north rather than northeast. Gradual intensification continued as the storm progressed closer to the coasts of Bangladesh and East India. At around 12:00 UTC on November 29, the tropical cyclone made landfall near the border between Bangladesh and West Bengal at the mouth of the Hooghly River. At the time, the JTWC analyzed the storm to have had maximum sustained winds of 200 km/h (120 mph); this was the cyclone's peak intensity. After landfall, the storm slowly weakened over Bangladesh and was last noted as a cyclonic storm-equivalent with sustained winds of 110 km/h (68 mph) on November 30.

== Impact and aftermath ==
The 1988 Bangladesh cyclone struck as Bangladesh was recovering from what had been considered the worst flood in Bangladeshi history earlier in the year. As a result, the additional effects of the passing cyclone exacerbated the flood's impacts. Beginning two days before landfall, Bangladesh state radio and television continuously broadcast warning signals urging the evacuation of endangered residents along coastal areas.

The storm's worst impacts were concentrated in the coastal Bangladeshi districts of Bagerhat, Barguna, Bhola, Jessore, Khulna, Patuakhali and Satkhira, as well as the Sundarbans. A 2 m (6.6 ft) storm surge inflicted significant damage along the Bangladeshi coast and forced the temporary closure of the Port of Mongla, where nine were killed. Off the coast, waves generated by the tropical cyclone reached 4.5 m (15 ft). Twenty vessels and barges and hundreds of small fishing boats sank as a result of the rough seas and storm surge generated by the storm. Another 37 vessels carrying £2 million (US$3.7 million) of goods ran aground. (Note: Monetary values converted to 1988 United States dollars using Fxtop.com) Approximately 200 km (120 mi) offshore, the Singaporean freighter Pumori capsized due to the cyclone, killing 19. Initially reported as a much lower figure, 5,708 fatalities occurred as a result of the tropical cyclone. Despite the high death toll, the Bangladeshi government stated that human casualties were minimized by efficient early warning systems. However, other deaths were blamed on poor communication systems, which did not effectively relay information to residents in more rural areas. Many of the deaths were caused by the collapse of dwellings or by electrocution due to the collapse of high tension power poles, and most of the deaths occurred in Khulna District. Nine people were killed in Khulna after a single power pole collapsed onto a house. A hundred corpses were discovered on the island of Dublar Char alone. In Satkhira, 100 people were killed due to flying debris kicked up by the storm's fierce winds. In addition to the fatalities, nearly three million people were left homeless.

The storm's effects also resulted in the deaths of over 33,000 cattleheads and inflicted a heavy blow to the country's November–December rice harvest. Crop damage occurred across 174,000 hectares (430,000 acres) of land in Bagerhat, Bhola, Khulna, and Satkhira districts as well as Cox's Bazar. The total gross weight of crop losses was estimated at 200,000 tonnes (220,000 tons), accounting for 70% of Bangladeshi crops that were ready for harvest. Extensive damage to infrastructure was reported across the nation. Most mud and straw houses and tin shed offices and schools were destroyed due to the storm. Telecommunications and electrical supplies were disrupted by the storm in at least sixteen towns and four coastal districts. In the capital city of Dhaka, debris and fallen trees caused by winds of up to 120 km/h (75 mph) resulted in both power outages and paralyzed traffic. The power outages also disrupted the city's distribution of water. In Shyamnagar Upazila, all mud and straw-constructed homes were destroyed. Overall, an official estimates suggested 50,000 homes were destroyed across the country. However, independent investigations were more aggressive in their estimates, suggesting that over a million homes accounting for 60–80% of homes in coastal Bangladesh were destroyed, displacing as many as seven million people.

In nearby West Bengal in India, the death toll was largely disputed between government agencies and news agencies, with the former generally indicating lower figures. While the Kolkata Police Force initially reported 210 deaths, various news agencies suggested that the death toll was around 500. Ultimately, the official death toll in West Bengal reached 538. In addition to human casualties, the cyclone also killed 57,604 heads of cattle. The damage in West Bengal totaled US$13 million.

Following the cyclone's passage, the Bangladesh Red Crescent Society began dispatching relief teams, food, and other supplies to impacted areas. The Bangladesh Army and non-governmental organizations participated in both air- and water-borne relief operations, though inclement weather initially forced the suspension of several planned helicopter flights. Both the Bangladesh Navy and Indian Navy convened in the northern littoral of the Bay of Bengal to search for the thousands of fishermen and islanders that went missing during the tropical cyclone's landfall. Due to the wide scope of the disaster, the Bangladeshi government appealed for international aid, particularly from Japan and Canada as those countries had played large roles in the relief efforts of past Bangladeshi disasters. The Government of the Netherlands donated US$370,000 for use in the relief efforts following the storm. Lord Glenarthur, then British Minister of State for Foreign Affairs, toured affected areas in Bangladesh for three days before announcing a £200,000 grant (US$370,000) to voluntary relief agencies assisting in cyclone relief operations. Then-Bangladeshi President Hussain Muhammad Ershad also visited the worst impacted districts, including Khulna and Bagerhat. Following these visits, Ershad's administration established a national disaster committee composed of relief specialists to coordinate relief and rehabilitation efforts.

== See also ==
- 1991 Bangladesh cyclone
- May 1997 Bangladesh cyclone
- 2002 West Bengal cyclone
