= 1988 North Indian Ocean cyclone season =

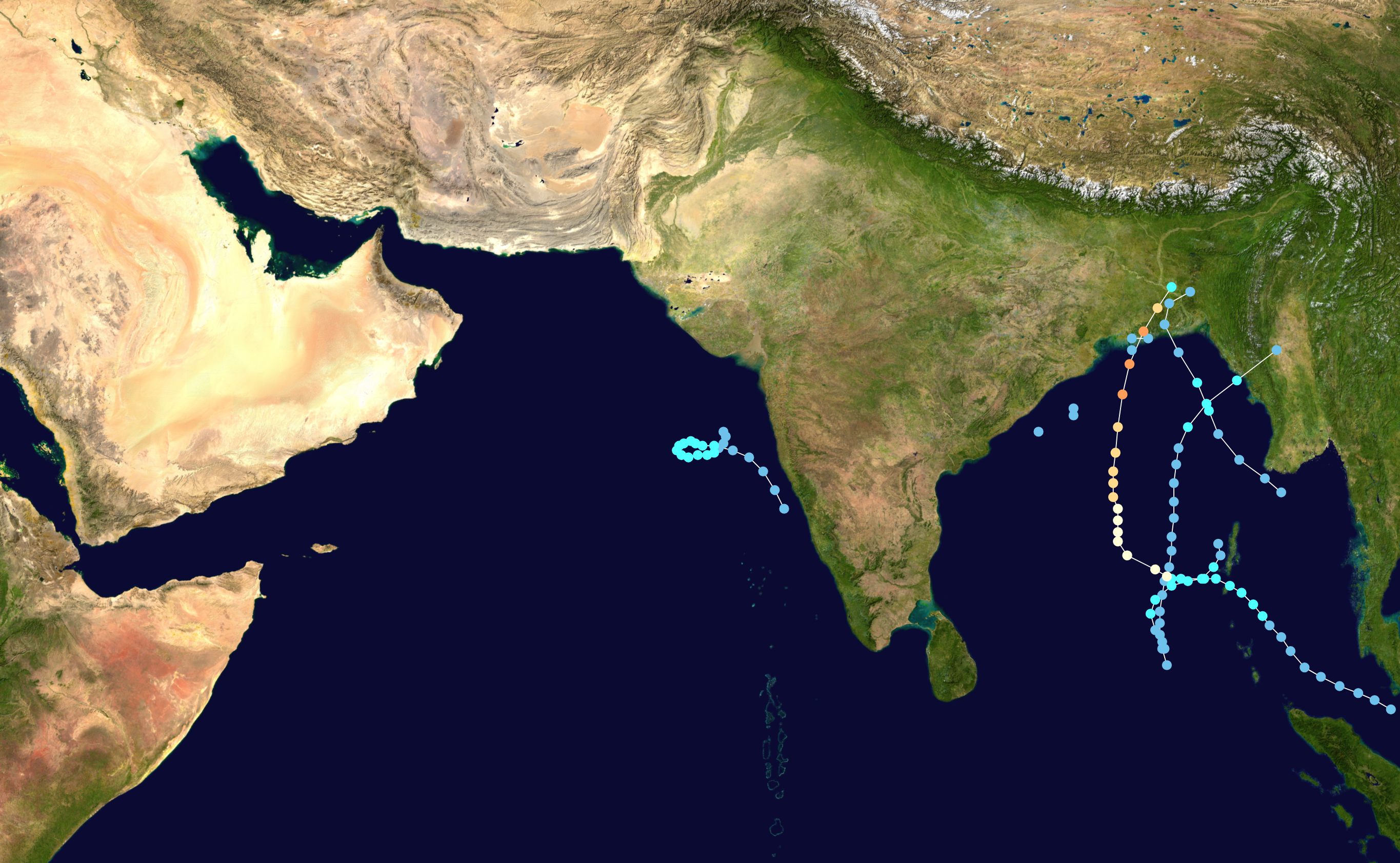
- Season summary map

Seasonal boundaries
- First system formed: June 2, 1988
- Last system dissipated: December 8, 1988

Strongest storm
- Name: BOB 07
  - Maximum winds: 215 km/h (130 mph) (3-minute sustained)
  - Lowest pressure: 955 hPa (mbar)

Seasonal statistics
- Depressions: 9
- Deep depressions: 6
- Cyclonic storms: 2
- Severe cyclonic storms: 2
- Very severe cyclonic storms: 1
- Extremely severe cyclonic storms: 1
- Super cyclonic storms: 0
- Total fatalities: 6,740
- Total damage: $13 million (1988 USD)

Related articles
- 1988 Atlantic hurricane season; 1988 Pacific hurricane season; 1988 Pacific typhoon season

The 1988 North Indian Ocean cyclone season was a below average season. The season has no official bounds but cyclones tend to form between April and December. These dates conventionally delimit the period of each year when most tropical cyclones form in the northern Indian Ocean. There are two main seas in the North Indian Ocean—the Bay of Bengal to the east of the Indian subcontinent and the Arabian Sea to the west of India. The official Regional Specialized Meteorological Centre in this basin is the India Meteorological Department (IMD), while the Joint Typhoon Warning Center (JTWC) releases unofficial advisories. An average of five tropical cyclones form in the North Indian Ocean every season with peaks in May and November. Cyclones occurring between the meridians 45°E and 100°E are included in the season by the IMD.

== Systems ==
=== Deep Depression ARB 01 ===
- Deep depression (IMD)
- Tropical storm (SSHWS)
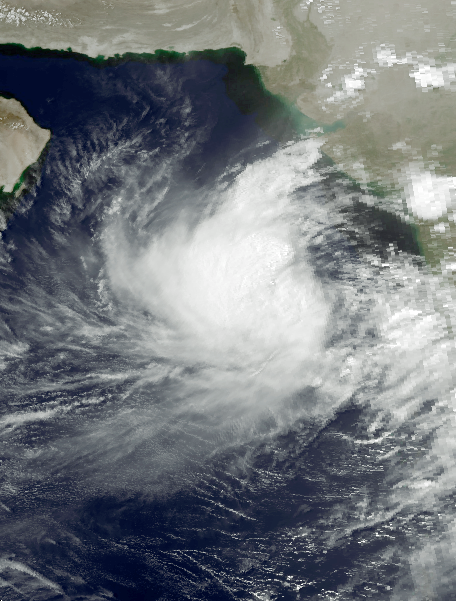
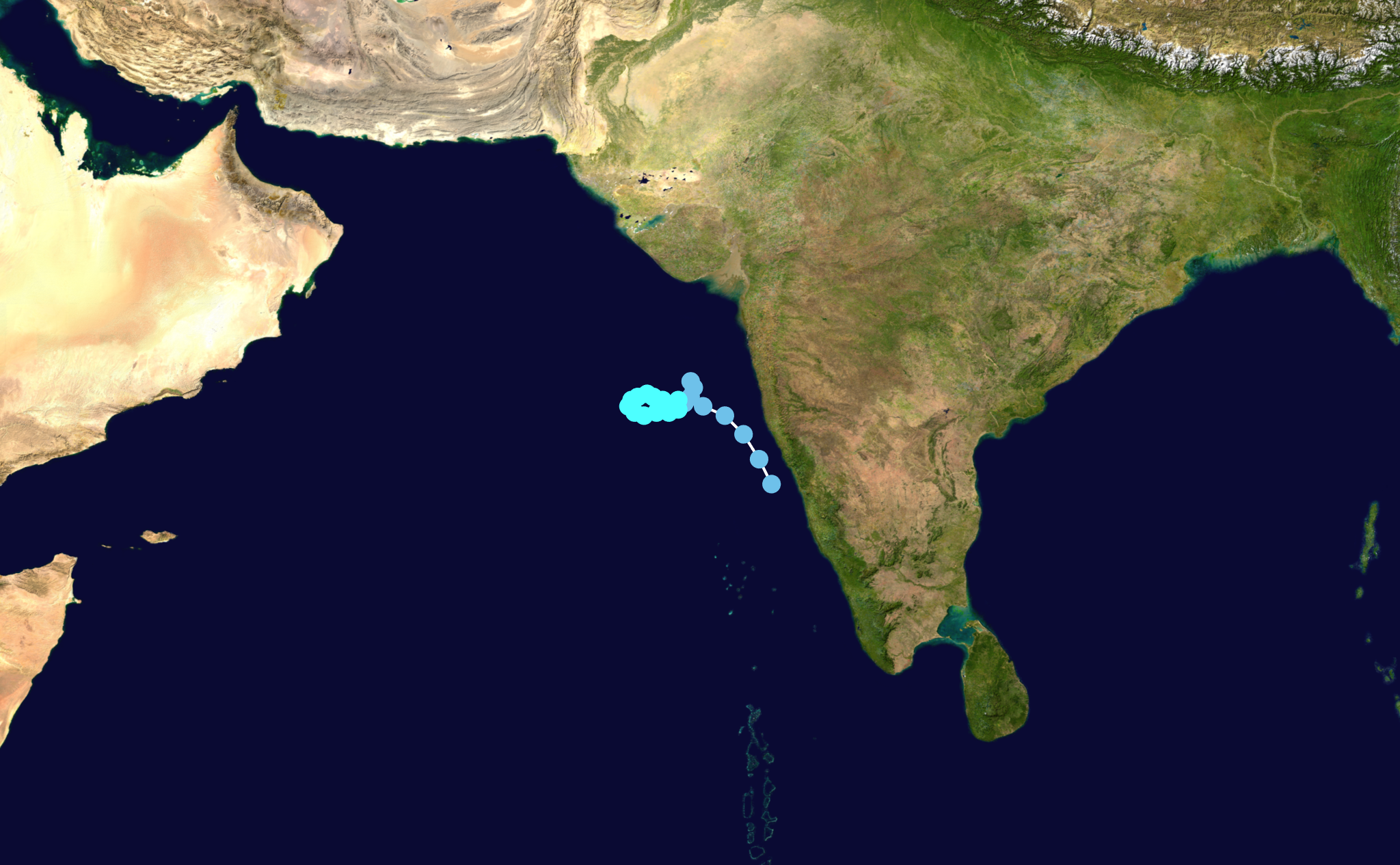
- Duration: June 8 – June 12
- Peak intensity: 55 km/h (35 mph) (3-min); 996 hPa (mbar)

A tropical depression that formed on June 8 off the western coast of India tracked westward, becoming a tropical storm on the 9th. It looped to the north, where upper-level winds ripped it apart on the 12th.

=== Deep Depression BOB 05 ===
- Deep depression (IMD)
- Tropical storm (SSHWS)
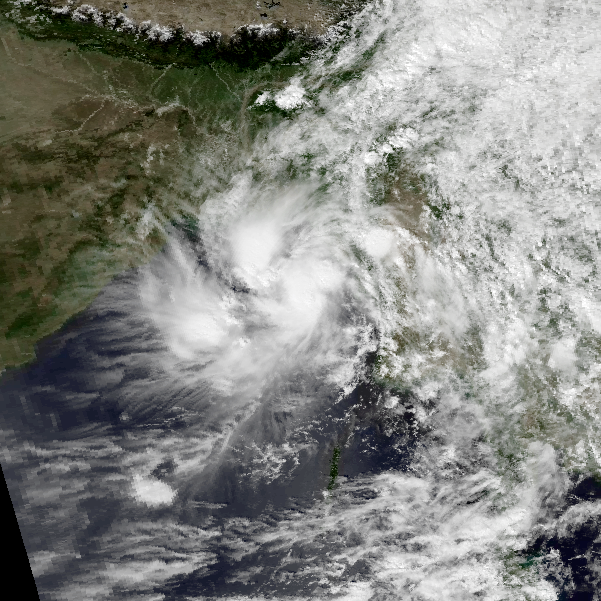
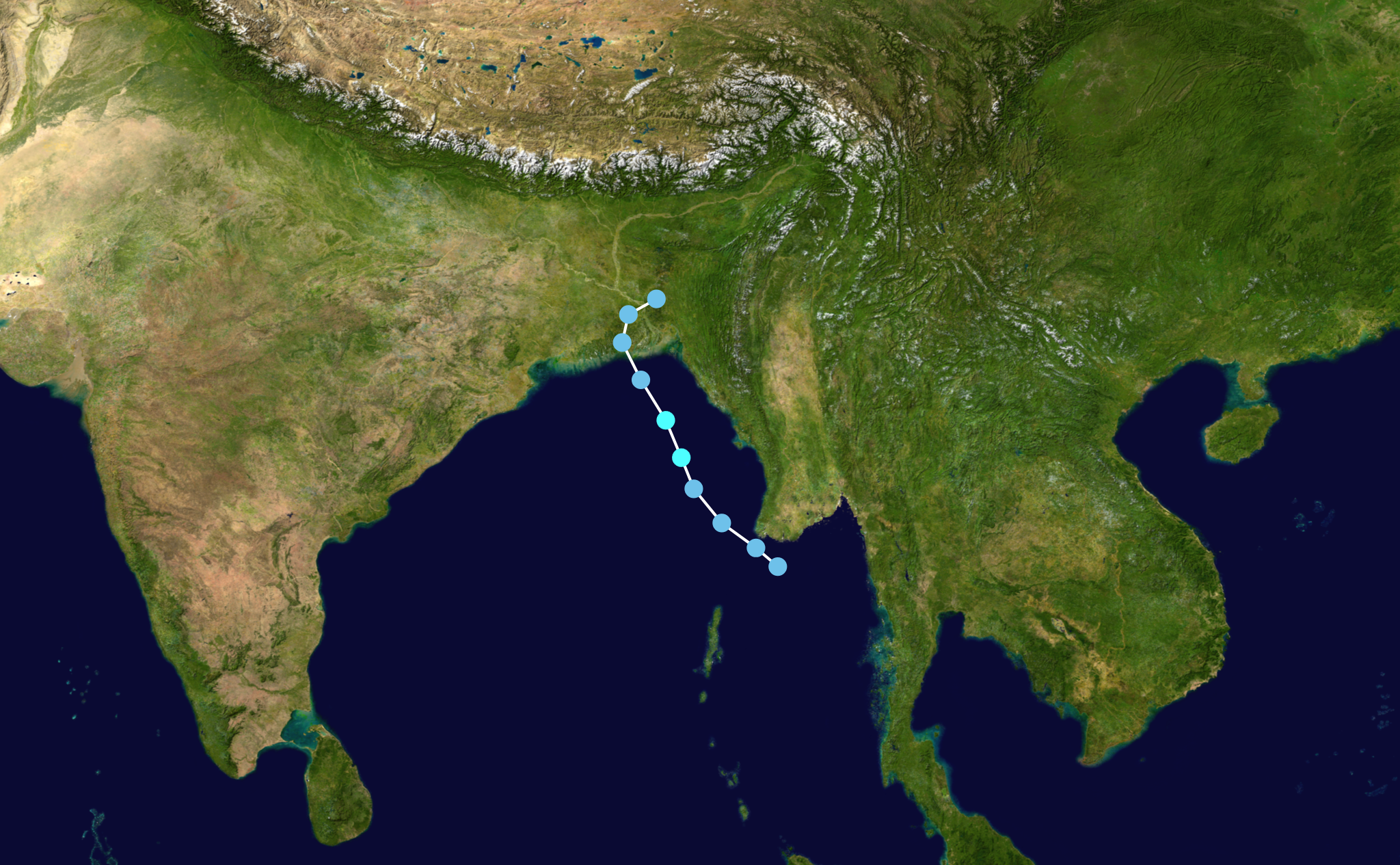
- Duration: October 17 – October 19
- Peak intensity: 55 km/h (35 mph) (3-min); 997 hPa (mbar)

A tropical disturbance in the eastern Bay of Bengal developed into a tropical depression on October 17. It moved northwestward, briefly becoming a tropical storm before upper-level winds weakened it. The storm hit Bangladesh as a tropical depression on the 19th, but still managed to cause strong storm surge and flooding amounting to 1500 casualties.

=== Severe Cyclonic Storm BOB 06 ===
- Severe cyclonic storm (IMD)
- Tropical storm (SSHWS)
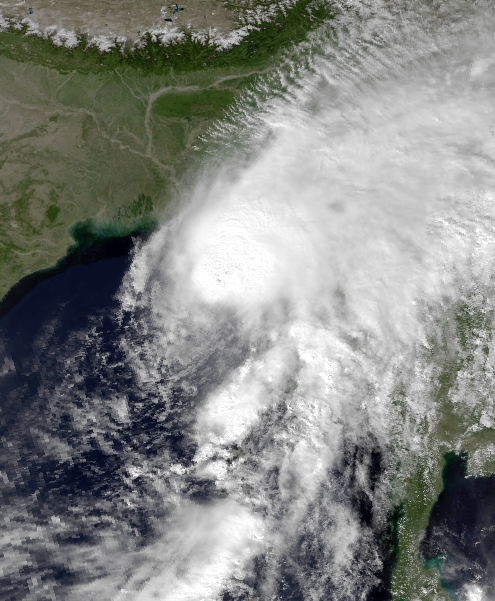
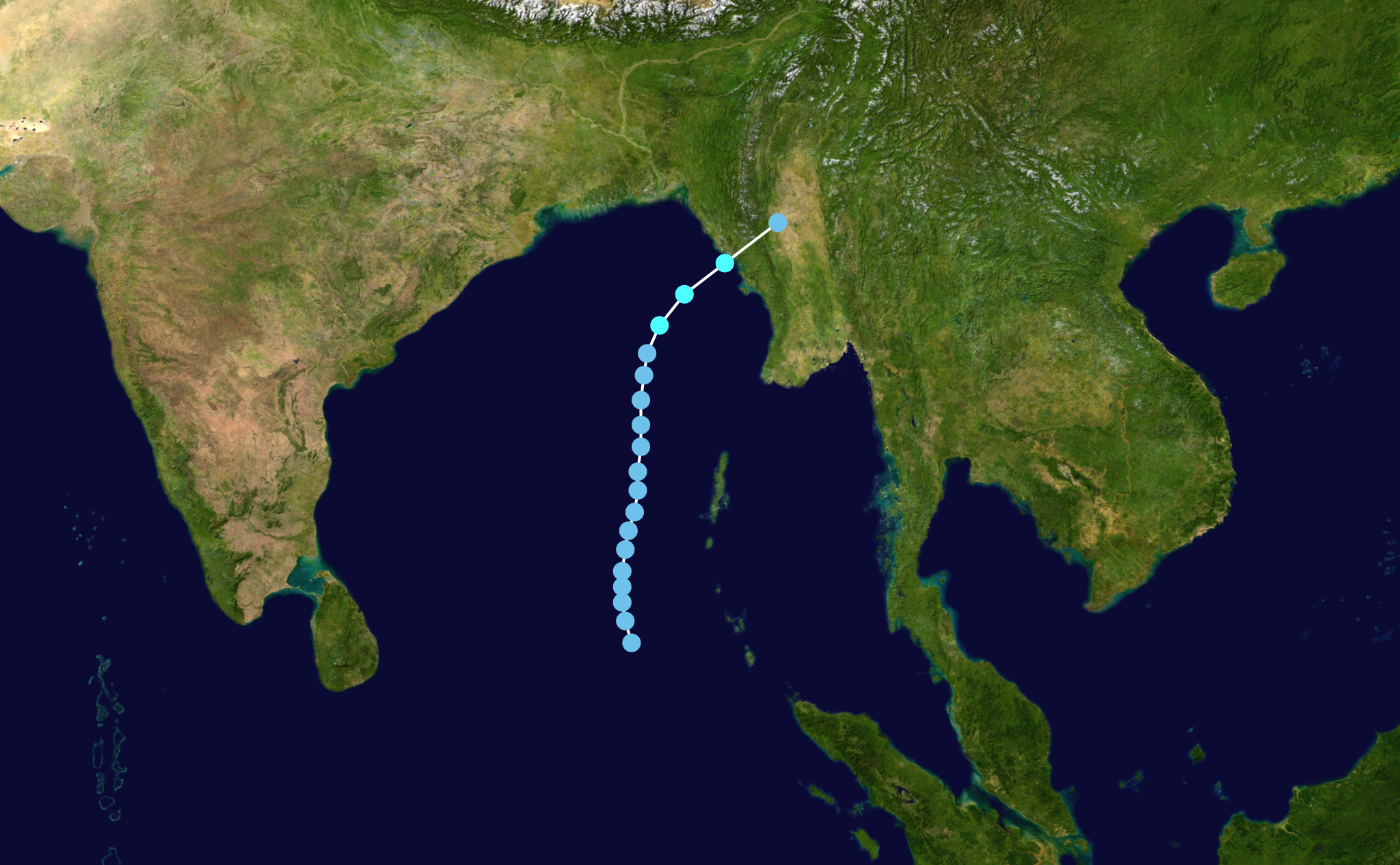
- Duration: November 14 – November 18
- Peak intensity: 100 km/h (65 mph) (3-min); 984 hPa (mbar)

Tropical Storm Three, which formed in the southern Bay of Bengal on November 14, tracked northward to reach a peak of 65 mph winds before hitting Myanmar on the 18th. The storm rapidly dissipated over land.

=== Extremely Severe Cyclonic Storm BOB 07 ===
- Extremely severe cyclonic storm (IMD)
- Category 3 tropical cyclone (SSHWS)
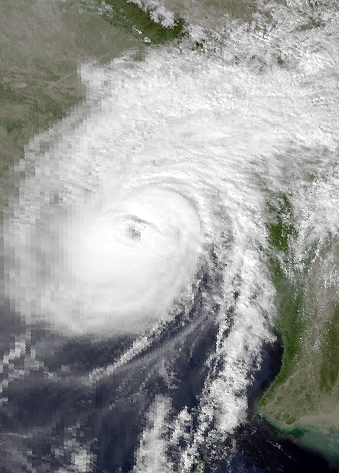
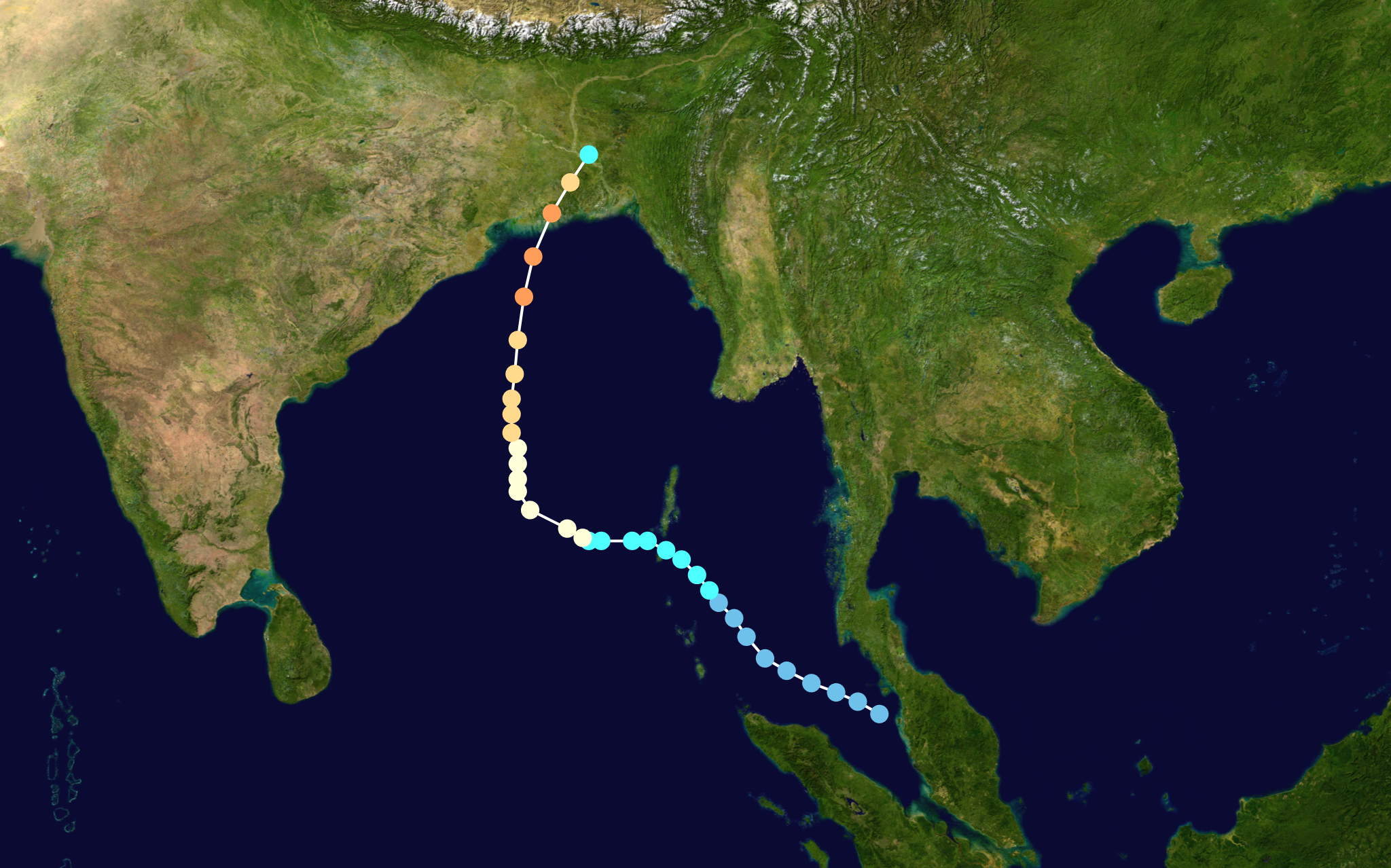
- Duration: November 21 – November 30
- Peak intensity: 215 km/h (130 mph) (3-min); 955 hPa (mbar)

The monsoon trough spawned a tropical depression just west of the Malay Peninsula on November 21. Its large circulation caused mudslides and flooding over western Indonesia before consolidating into a tropical storm on the 24th over the central Bay of Bengal. The storm turned northward, where conditions allowed for continued development. The storm became a cyclone on the 26th, and it continued to strengthen as it moved northward. Cyclone Four reached a peak of 130 mph just before hitting the Sundarbans part of Bangladesh. Heavy storm surge and torrential flooding killed 2000 people (with 6000 missing), and left millions homeless.

=== Deep Depression BOB 08 ===
- Deep depression (IMD)
- Tropical storm (SSHWS)
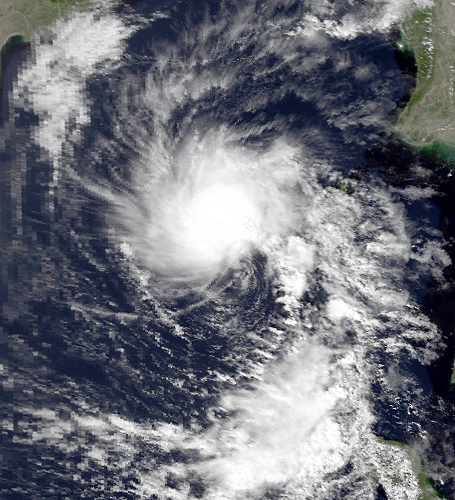
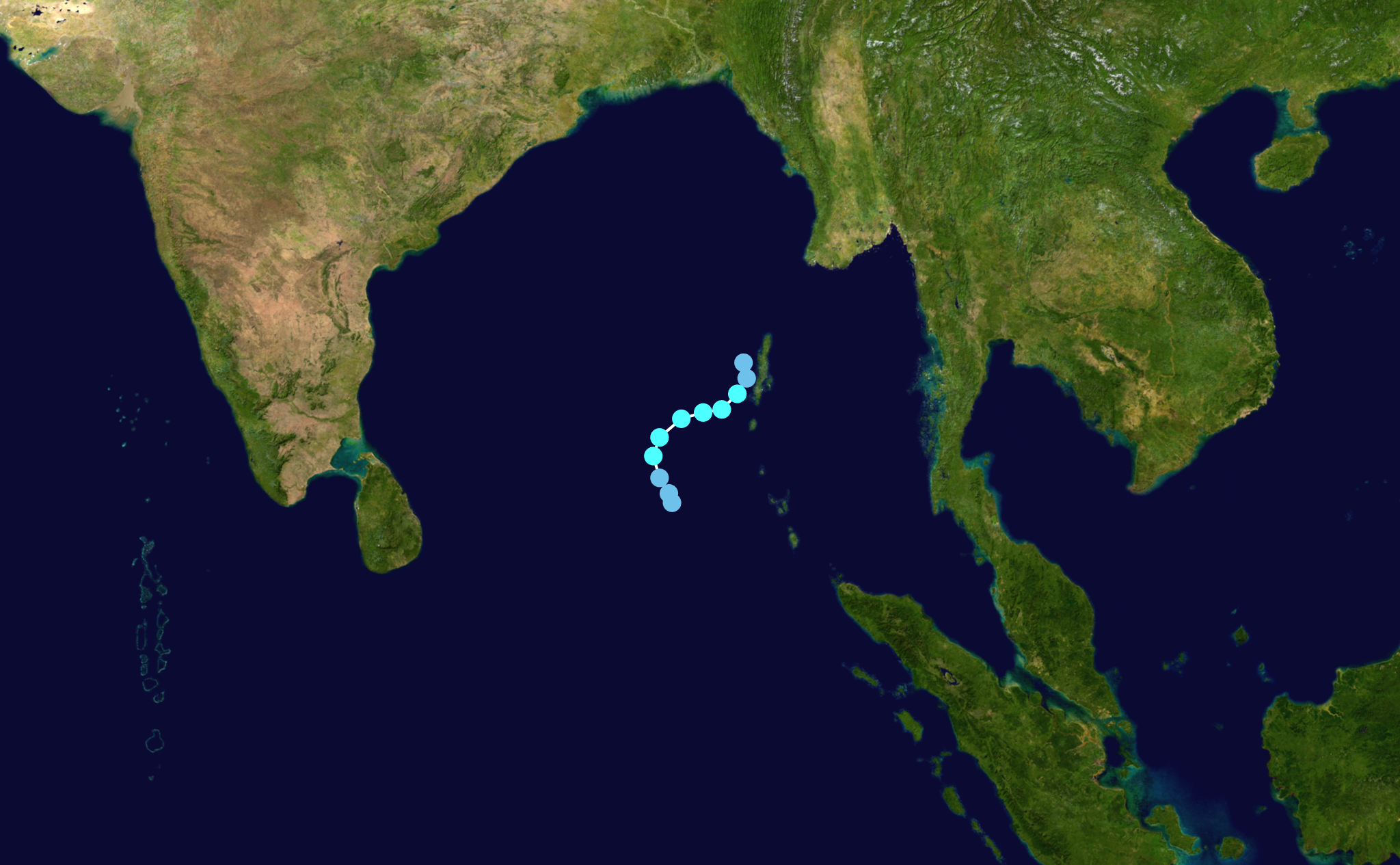
- Duration: December 6 – December 8
- Peak intensity: 55 km/h (35 mph) (3-min); 991 hPa (mbar)

From December 6 through the 8th, a tropical storm meandered through the central Bay of Bengal, remaining at sea through its lifetime.

== See also ==
- North Indian Ocean tropical cyclone
- 1988 Atlantic hurricane season
- 1988 Pacific hurricane season
- 1988 Pacific typhoon season
- Australian cyclone seasons: 1987–88, 1988–89
- South Pacific cyclone seasons: 1987–88, 1988–89
- South-West Indian Ocean cyclone seasons: 1987–88, 1988–89
