= Hurricane Florence (1988) =

Category 1 Atlantic hurricane in 1988

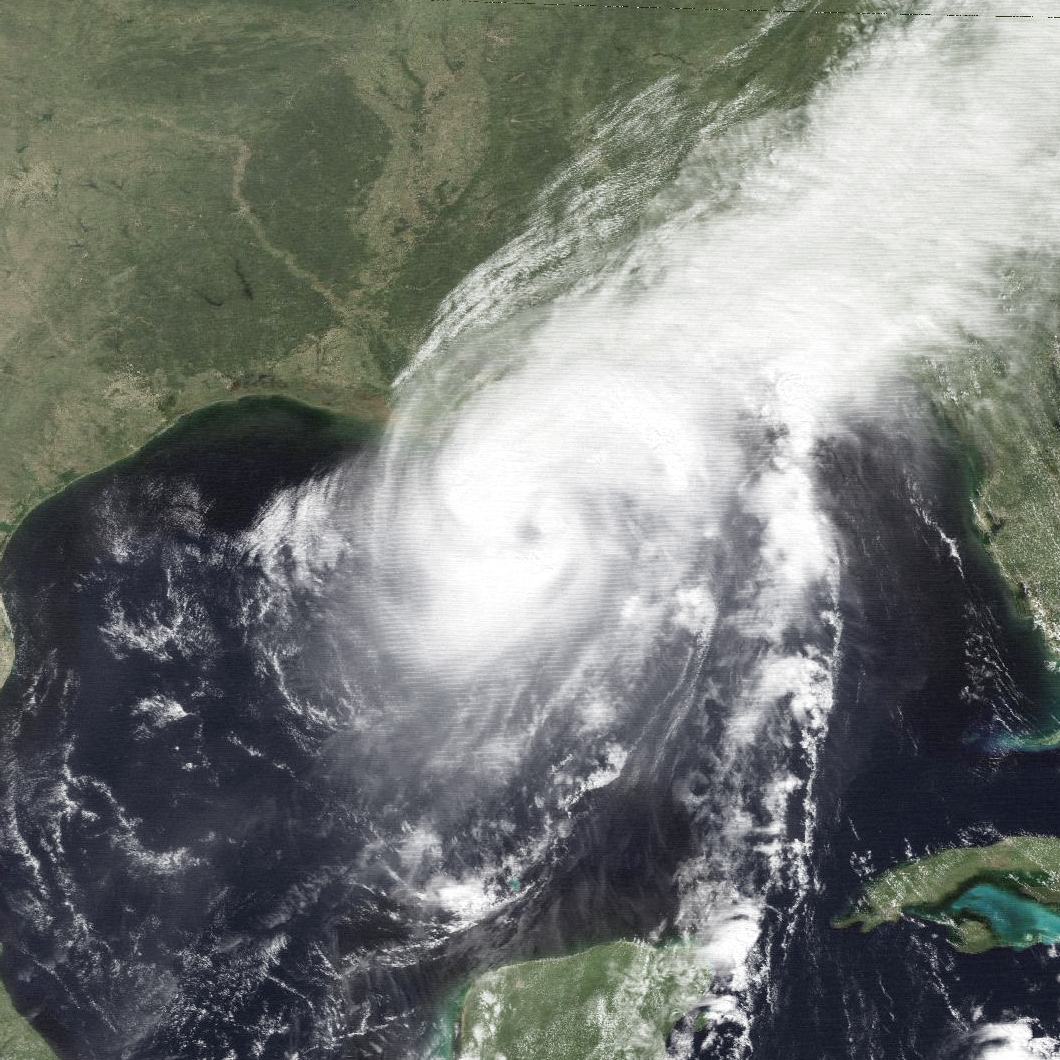
- Florence near peak intensity in the Gulf of Mexico on September 9

Meteorological history
- Formed: September 7, 1988
- Dissipated: September 11, 1988

Category 1 hurricane
- 1-minute sustained (SSHWS/NWS)
- Highest winds: 80 mph (130 km/h)
- Lowest pressure: 982 mbar (hPa); 29.00 inHg

Overall effects
- Fatalities: 1 direct
- Damage: $2.9 million (1988 USD)
- Areas affected: Yucatán Peninsula, Louisiana, Mississippi, Alabama, Florida
- IBTrACS
- Part of the 1988 Atlantic hurricane season

Hurricane Florence was the third of four named tropical cyclones to make landfall on the United States during the 1988 Atlantic hurricane season. The seventh tropical storm and second hurricane of the season, Florence developed on September 7 from an area of convection associated with a dissipating frontal trough in the southern Gulf of Mexico. After initially moving eastward, the storm turned northward and strengthened. Florence reached hurricane status and later peak winds of 80 mph (130 km/h) on September 9 shortly before striking southeastern Louisiana. The storm rapidly weakened over land and dissipated on September 11 over northeastern Texas.

Early in its duration, the storm dropped rainfall across the Yucatán Peninsula. Upon striking Louisiana, Florence produced a moderate storm surge, causing severe beach erosion in some locations. Gusty winds were also reported, causing power outages to over 100,000 people. In Alabama, one man died while trying to secure his boat. Rainfall from the hurricane caused severe river flooding in portions of the Florida Panhandle in an area already severely affected by heavy rainfall; the flooding damaged or destroyed dozens of houses in Santa Rosa County. Throughout its path, damage totaled about $2.9 million (1988 USD, $5.3 million 2008 USD).

== Meteorological history ==
Map plotting the storm's track and intensity, according to the Saffir–Simpson scale Map key Saffir–Simpson scale Tropical depression (≤38 mph, ≤62 km/h) Tropical storm (39–73 mph, 63–118 km/h) Category 1 (74–95 mph, 119–153 km/h) Category 2 (96–110 mph, 154–177 km/h) Category 3 (111–129 mph, 178–208 km/h) Category 4 (130–156 mph, 209–251 km/h) Category 5 (≥157 mph, ≥252 km/h) Unknown Storm type Tropical cyclone Subtropical cyclone Extratropical cyclone, remnant low, tropical disturbance, or monsoon depression

On September 4, a cold front exited the coast of Texas into the Gulf of Mexico. A convective band from the front continued southeastward and stalled between Veracruz, Mexico and Tampa, Florida. The band began to split into two on September 6; the northeastern portion developed into a frontal wave and tracked northeastward, while the southwestern portion remained nearly stationary and began showing signs of tropical organization. Located in an area of generally low pressures, the system developed a spiral band structure, though deep convection was mostly intermittent. Subsequent to the formation of a surface circulation, the system developed into a tropical depression while located about 450 miles (720 km) northwest of Mérida, Yucatán.

Tropical Storm Florence on September 9

The depression drifted eastward under the influence of the dissipating frontal trough, and intensified into Tropical Storm Florence to the north of the Yucatán Peninsula, as confirmed by Hurricane Hunters. Initially, the center was located to the north of the deep convection, with only one weak rainband to the north of the circulation. However, subsequent to a drop in vertical wind shear, an increase in moisture, and increase in upper-level outflow, deep convection greatly increased and organized over the circulation early on September 9. As the trough dissipated and a ridge built northwestward behind it, steering currents became weak, leaving Florence temporarily stationary. Later on September 9, the influence of a mid- to upper-level trough to its north caused Florence to accelerate northward. Steadily intensifying, Florence attained hurricane status about 100 miles (160 km) south of the mouth of the Mississippi River. The hurricane intensified slightly further, and struck the western Mississippi River Delta with winds of 80 mph (130 km/h) at 0200 UTC on September 10. Upon making landfall, dry air became entrained in the circulation, and Florence rapidly weakened over southeastern Louisiana. By the time it passed over New Orleans and Lake Pontchartrain most convection had dissipated, and about ten hours after making landfall Florence degenerated into a tropical depression. The system subsequently crossed over southwestern Mississippi as it turned northwestward, and later entered northern Louisiana before dissipating over northeastern Texas on September 11. The mid-level circulation turned northeastward through the central United States before dissipating over Ohio on September 13.

== Preparations ==
On September 9, about 16 hours before Florence made landfall, the National Hurricane Center issued a hurricane watch from Port Arthur, Texas to Pensacola, Florida. Three hours later, the watch was upgraded to a hurricane warning from Pensacola to Cameron, Louisiana, with a tropical storm warning issued from Pensacola eastward to Apalachicola, Florida. Around the time of Florence moving ashore, the National Hurricane Center limited the hurricane warning from Pensacola, Florida to Morgan City, Louisiana. Hours after the hurricane made landfall, the warning was replaced by a tropical storm warning from Mobile, Alabama to Grand Isle, Louisiana, which was discontinued two hours later.

Prior to the arrival of the hurricane, an estimated 20,000 people evacuated the coastal parishes of southeastern Louisiana, including nearly all of the 2,000 residents on Grand Isle. Small-scale evacuations were issued for residents living in low-lying or coastal areas of Mississippi and Alabama. Offshore, the threat of the hurricane prompted oil companies to evacuate employees on oil rigs to the mainland.

The threat of the hurricane caused Democratic presidential nominee Michael Dukakis to cancel a rally and two fund-raising events in New Orleans. Governor Buddy Roemer issued for the Louisiana National Guard to be on standby for emergency duty. Officials closed several bridges across southeastern Louisiana and also canceled ferry travel across Lake Pontchartrain. In Pensacola, Florida, the Navy base moved the USS Lexington into the Gulf of Mexico during the hurricane, and also sent more than 100 aircraft to a base in Ohio.

== Impact ==
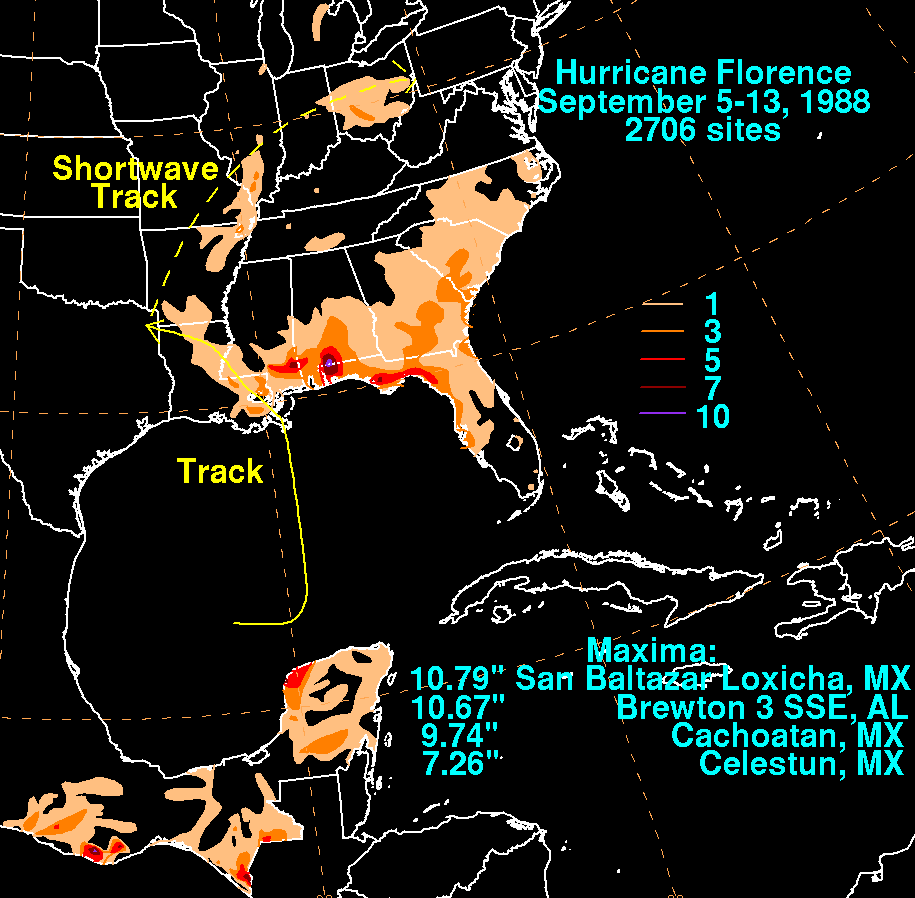
Rainfall Summary for Hurricane Florence

The primary rainband extending southward from the circulation of Florence dropped moderate rainfall across the Yucatán Peninsula and through southern Mexico. Rainfall amounts peaked at 10.79 inches (274 mm) in San Baltazar Loxicha, Guerrero, with 10.67 inches (271 mm) reported in southeastern Chiapas and 9.74 inches (247 mm) near Merida. Damage, if any, is unknown.

Upon making landfall on Louisiana, Hurricane Florence produced higher than normal tides, including a peak observation of 7.5 feet (2.3 m) above mean sea level on the Bayou Benvenue to the east of New Orleans. Rainfall was relatively light, ranging from about 1 inch (25 mm) to a maximum of 4.05 inches (103 mm) at Watson. Winds of tropical storm force occurred across southeastern Louisiana, with wind gusts peaking at 64 mph (103 km/h) at an automatic Coast Guard Station on the Southwest Pass of the Mississippi River Delta. An unofficial tornado was reported in Tangipahoa Parish. Minor storm surge flooding occurred outside of the levee system of southern Louisiana in Plaquemines, Saint Bernard, and Saint Tammany Parishes. On Grand Isle, strong wave action resulted in significant beach erosion, with most areas on the island losing about 40 feet (12 m) of beach. The storm surge also flooded a portion of Louisiana Highway 300 near Delacroix. The passage of the hurricane broke a levee in Delacroix; it was quickly repaired with flooding from the levee being pumped to the gulf. Light to moderate damage was reported across the southeastern portion of the state, primarily from falling trees. The winds also downed numerous power lines, leaving about 150,000 people without power for some period of time during the storm. The power outages were short-lived, with about 6,900 left without power by the day after the hurricane. Damage in the state was fairly minor, totaling about $2.5 million (1988 USD, $4.4 million 2007 USD).

Rainfall from Florence reached over 7 inches (180 mm) at one location in southeastern Mississippi, while a station 3 miles (4.8 km) south-southeast of Brewton, Alabama reported a storm-wide peak rainfall total of 10.67 inches (271 mm). Despite the rainfall, no damage was reported in Alabama or Mississippi. In Mobile Bay in Alabama, one man died while attempting to secure his boat — the only direct fatality related to the hurricane.

Heavy rainfall was reported along the Florida Panhandle, peaking at over 10 inches (250 mm) in the extreme northwestern portion of the state. The rainfall caused the worst flooding in ten years, and resulted in additional flooding to the already swollen Coldwater Creek and Blackwater River in Santa Rosa County. Near the river, 30 homes were destroyed with an additional 50 houses damaged, totaling about $320,000 (1988 USD, $560,000 2007 USD) in damage. Several roads were closed from the flooding, as well. The strong convective band associated with Florence extended across the Florida Panhandle, spawning nine tornadoes in Walton County and one waterspout in Bay County. Damage from the tornadoes amounted to about $100,000 (1988 USD, $175,000 2007 USD).

The remnant circulation of Florence produced light to moderate rainfall across the Ohio Valley and central United States. Precipitation reached over 3 inches (76 mm) in extreme southeastern Missouri, southern Illinois, and central Ohio, and extended as far northward as Michigan.

== See also ==
- List of wettest tropical cyclones in Alabama
