= Tropical Storm Beryl (1988) =

Atlantic tropical storm

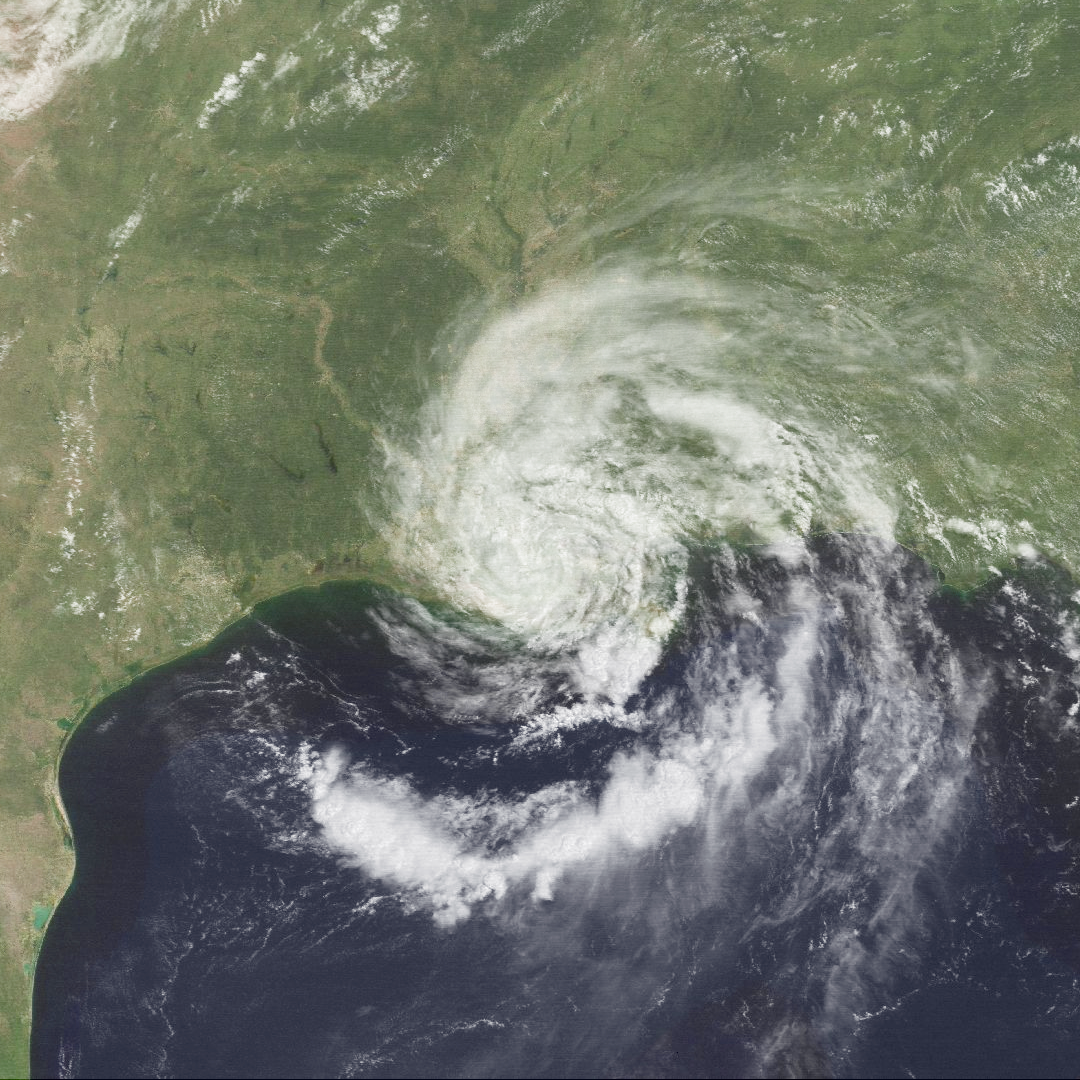
- Tropical Storm Beryl over Louisiana

Meteorological history
- Formed: August 8, 1988
- Dissipated: August 10, 1988

Tropical storm
- 1-minute sustained (SSHWS/NWS)
- Highest winds: 50 mph (85 km/h)
- Lowest pressure: 1001 mbar (hPa); 29.56 inHg

Overall effects
- Fatalities: 1 direct
- Damage: $3 million (1988 USD)
- Areas affected: Gulf Coast of the United States
- IBTrACS
- Part of the 1988 Atlantic hurricane season

Tropical Storm Beryl was an unusual Atlantic tropical cyclone that formed over southeastern Louisiana in August 1988. The second tropical storm of the 1988 Atlantic hurricane season, Beryl developed from a slow-moving trough of low pressure on August 8. It tracked southeastward into the coastal waters of eastern Louisiana, and Beryl reached peak winds of 50 mph (80 km/h) while located about 75 miles (121 km) southeast of New Orleans. The storm turned to the northwest over Louisiana and Texas, and slowly dissipated. The remnants of Beryl continued northward into the central United States, dropping some rainfall and providing relief to a severe heat wave.

Due to its slow motion, Beryl dropped heavy amounts of rainfall, peaking at 16.09 inches (409 mm) on Dauphin Island in Alabama. The rainfall caused some reports of flooding, while prolonged durations of rough waves resulted in severe beach erosion. The waves capsized a boat in Mobile Bay, killing one of its passengers. Overall damage was minor, totaling about $3 million (1988 USD, $5.46 million 2009 USD).

== Meteorological history ==
Map plotting the storm's track and intensity, according to the Saffir–Simpson scale Map key Saffir–Simpson scale Tropical depression (≤38 mph, ≤62 km/h) Tropical storm (39–73 mph, 63–118 km/h) Category 1 (74–95 mph, 119–153 km/h) Category 2 (96–110 mph, 154–177 km/h) Category 3 (111–129 mph, 178–208 km/h) Category 4 (130–156 mph, 209–251 km/h) Category 5 (≥157 mph, ≥252 km/h) Unknown Storm type Tropical cyclone Subtropical cyclone Extratropical cyclone, remnant low, tropical disturbance, or monsoon depression

A weak surface trough of low pressure emerged into the northeast Gulf of Mexico on August 1. Under weak steering currents, the trough drifted westward, and slowly became better defined with the formation of a circulation in the mid- through upper-levels of the atmosphere. An upper-level low developed over Texas, providing unfavorable amounts of vertical wind shear. A surface circulation was first evident on satellite imagery on August 4 just off the coast of Mississippi, and for several days it remained nearly stationary over the Mississippi Sound. As the upper-level low over Texas drifted southwestward, an anticyclone developed over the system, with the circulation becoming better defined and more vertically aligned. On August 7, the system drifted into southeastern Louisiana. It continued to become better organized, and on August 8 it developed into Tropical Depression Three while located near the northern coast of Lake Pontchartrain. This is unusual in that tropical cyclones rarely form over land.

Upon becoming a tropical cyclone, the depression drifted southeastward, and within hours of its formation it emerged into the Gulf of Mexico. Based on ship reports and observations from oil rigs, it is estimated the depression intensified into Tropical Storm Beryl at 1000 UTC on August 8 while located just offshore coastal Louisiana. Conditions remained favorable for further intensification, with the circulation located over warm waters and maintaining well-defined outflow; early on August 9 Beryl attained its peak intensity of 50 mph while located about 75 miles (121 km) southeast of New Orleans. Shortly thereafter, a trough from the northwest dissipated the anticyclone and resulted in a steady northwest motion very near where the cyclone originally moved offshore. Beryl maintained tropical storm status for about 18 hours before weakening to a tropical depression over central Louisiana. It turned to the northwest, and the surface circulation dissipated on August 10 while located a short distance south of Shreveport, Louisiana. The surface low pressure area crossed into north Texas before dissipating early on August 12, while its upper-level circulation turned northward into Oklahoma before being merged by an approaching trough.

== Preparations ==
The National Hurricane Center issued a tropical storm warnings from Morgan City, Louisiana to Pensacola, Florida. The threat of Beryl prompted some voluntary evacuations in St. Bernard Parish in Louisiana, and also forced the evacuations of thousands from offshore oil rigs. Officials advised small craft to remain at port from Port O'Connor, Texas to Pensacola, Florida.

== Impact ==
Across the south-central United States, Beryl dropped heavy rainfall, with a peak of 16.09 inches (409 mm) recorded on Dauphin Island in Alabama. Rough waves overturned a shrimp boat in Mobile Bay, killing a 15-year-old boy. The boy's father was rescued by the United States Coast Guard after spending 24 hours in the water. The waves caused severe beach erosion in Alabama and Mississippi, with Dauphin Island losing 60 to 70 feet (18 to 21 m) of beach. In Mississippi, more than 10 inches (250 mm) of precipitation caused caused significant river flooding along the Biloxi River. Sustained winds reached 47 mph (76 km/h) at Gulfport, the strongest wind on a land station. Beryl dropped rainfall across much of Louisiana, peaking at over 10 inches (250 mm) near Morgan City. Wind gusts in Louisiana, reaching 40 mph (64 km/h) in New Orleans, caused light tree damage and power outages. A storm surge of about 5 feet (1.5 m) caused some coastal flooding. The remnants of Beryl produced heavy rainfall of about 12 inches (300 mm) in east-central Texas, resulting in flash flooding along roads and increased water levels along the Angelina River. Farther inland, Beryl dropped rainfall and provided relief to a severe heat wave in the central United States.

Throughout its path, Beryl caused about $3 million in damage (1988 USD), primarily along the immediate coastline from erosion or flood damage.

== See also ==
- Other tropical cyclones named Beryl
- List of wettest tropical cyclones in Alabama
- Tropical Storm Julia (2016) - the most recent storm to form over land
