= 1988 Atlantic hurricane season =

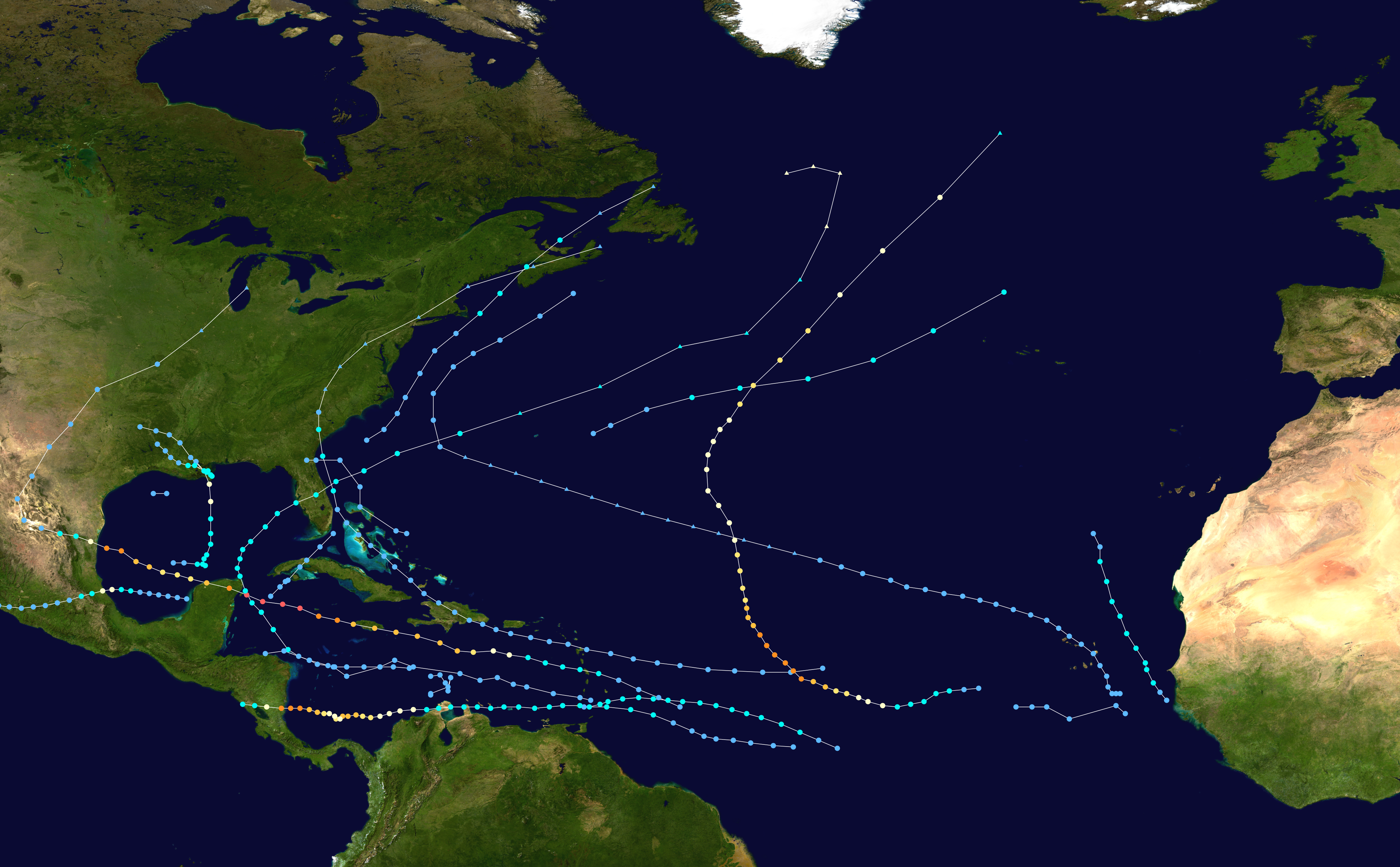
- Season summary map

Seasonal boundaries
- First system formed: May 31, 1988
- Last system dissipated: November 24, 1988

Strongest storm
- Name: Gilbert (Second-most intense Atlantic hurricane; most intense at the time)
  - Maximum winds: 185 mph (295 km/h) (1-minute sustained)
  - Lowest pressure: 888 mbar (hPa; 26.22 inHg)

Seasonal statistics
- Total depressions: 19
- Total storms: 12
- Hurricanes: 5
- Major hurricanes (Cat. 3+): 3
- Total fatalities: 601–719 total
- Total damage: $4.99 billion (1988 USD)

Related articles
- Timeline of the 1988 Atlantic hurricane season; 1988 Pacific hurricane season; 1988 Pacific typhoon season; 1988 North Indian Ocean cyclone season

The 1988 Atlantic hurricane season was a near average season that proved costly and deadly, with 15 tropical cyclones directly affecting land. The season officially began on June 1, 1988, and lasted until November 30, 1988, although activity began on May 30 when a tropical depression developed in the Caribbean. The June through November dates conventionally delimit the period of each year when most tropical cyclones form in the Atlantic basin. The first cyclone to attain tropical storm status was Alberto on August 8, nearly a month later than usual. The final storm of the year, Tropical Storm Keith, became extratropical on November 24. The season produced 19 tropical depressions of which 12 attained tropical storm status. One tropical storm was operationally classified as a tropical depression but was reclassified in post-analysis. Five tropical cyclones reached hurricane status of which three became major hurricanes reaching Category 3 on the Saffir–Simpson scale. Until the 2022 Atlantic hurricane season, it was the latest season to have multiple Atlantic-Pacific crossover storms.

There were two notable cyclones of the season, the first one being Hurricane Gilbert, which at the time was the strongest Atlantic hurricane on record. The hurricane tracked through the Caribbean Sea and the Gulf of Mexico and caused devastation in Mexico and many island nations, particularly Jamaica. Its passage caused $2.98 billion in damage (1988 USD) (Note: All damage figures are in 1988 United States dollars, unless otherwise noted) and more than 300 deaths, mostly in Mexico. The second one was Hurricane Joan, which struck Nicaragua as a Category 4 hurricane and caused about US$1.87 billion in damage and more than 200 deaths. The hurricane crossed into the eastern Pacific Ocean and was reclassified as Tropical Storm Miriam. Hurricane Debby also successfully crossed over, becoming Tropical Depression Seventeen-E, making the 1988 season the first on record in which more than one tropical cyclone has crossed between the Atlantic and Pacific basins intact.

== Seasonal forecasts ==
Predictions of tropical activity in the 1988 season
Source	Date	Named storms	Hurricanes	Major hurricanes
WRC	Early 1988	8	5	Unknown
CSU	June	11	7	Unknown
CSU	August	11	7	Unknown
Record high activity		30	15	7 (Tie)
Record low activity		1	0 (tie)	0
Actual activity		12	5	3

Forecasts of hurricane activity are issued before each hurricane season by noted hurricane experts such as Dr. William M. Gray and his associates at Colorado State University. A normal season as defined by NOAA has six to fourteen named storms of which four to eight reach hurricane strength and one to three become major hurricanes. The June 1988 forecast was that eleven storms would form and that seven would reach hurricane status. The forecast did not specify how many hurricanes would reach major hurricane status. In August, CSU opted to not alter their forecast, continuing to call for eleven named storms and seven hurricanes. Additionally, the Weather Research Center (WRC) issued a prediction in early 1988, forecasting eight named storms and five hurricanes.

== Seasonal summary ==
The Atlantic hurricane season officially began on June 1, but activity in 1988 began two days earlier with the formation of Tropical Depression One on May 30. It was an above average season in which 19 tropical depressions formed. Twelve depressions attained tropical storm status, and five of these attained hurricane status, of which three reached major hurricane status. Four hurricanes and three tropical storms made landfall during the season and caused 550 deaths and $4.86 billion in damage. The last storm of the season, Tropical Storm Keith, dissipated on November 24, only 6 days before the official end of the season on November 30.

The activity in the first two months of the season was limited because of strong wind shear from an upper tropospheric flow. Although vigorous tropical waves moved off the coast of Africa, most of them quickly diminished in intensity as they crossed the tropical Atlantic Ocean. As a result, no tropical depressions formed in June or July. Decreased wind shear in August allowed tropical waves to develop into tropical cyclones. The official storm track forecast errors were 30 to 40 percent lower than the average for the previous 10 years. The 24-, 48-, and 72-hour forecasts were the most accurate in more than 18 years and were also more accurate than in each subsequent season until 1996.

The season's activity was reflected with an accumulated cyclone energy (ACE) rating of 103, which is classified as "near normal". ACE is, broadly speaking, a measure of the power of the hurricane multiplied by the length of time it existed, so storms that last a long time, as well as particularly strong hurricanes, have high ACEs. It is only calculated for full advisories on tropical systems at or exceeding 34 knots (39 mph; 63 km/h), which is tropical storm strength.

== Systems ==
=== Tropical Depression One ===
- Tropical depression (SSHWS)
- Duration: May 31 – June 2
- Peak intensity: 30 mph (45 km/h) (1-min); 1002 mbar (hPa)

By late on May 29, scattered showers and thunderstorms existed over the northwestern Caribbean Sea. A weak surface low-pressure area formed on the following day, with the National Hurricane Center (NHC) noting some very deep and concentrated convection. Around 18:00 UTC on May 30, Tropical Depression One developed in the western Caribbean Sea, a day before the start of the Atlantic hurricane season. The depression moved northeastward along the axis of a northeast-southwest oriented trough, passing just northwest of Isla de la Juventud before striking the Cuban mainland south of Havana. As it crossed the country, its strongest rainfall was east of the center, and the depression failed to intensify beyond winds of 30 mph (45 km/h). After a hurricane hunters flight could not detect a circulation, the depression degenerated into an open trough east of Florida on June 2. The final discussion by the NHC noted the presence of several weak eddies, but that none were close enough to the remaining deep convection to justify the system continuing to be classified as a tropical cyclone.

While crossing Cuba, the depression dropped heavy rainfall that led to 37 deaths. Rainfall peaked at 40.35 in (1,025 mm) in Cienfuegos Province, of which 34.13 in (867 mm) fell in one day. The heavy rainfall caused flooding in Camagüey that damaged about 5,700 houses and destroyed 200. The flooding also damaged 15 schools and hospitals, as well as several crop buildings. The floods left widespread areas without electricity or communications. The floods destroyed six bridges, damaged 55 rail lines, and left 131 roads unpassable, which severely disrupted the country's transportation infrastructure. Flooding prompted officials to use rescue crews, helicopters, and amphibious vehicles to evacuate 65,000 residents in low-lying areas to higher grounds. A tornado in the city of Camagüey destroyed five Soviet planes and multiple buildings. The depression also killed thousands of livestock. The Red Cross sent medical units, tents, and blankets by plane. Overall about 90,000 people were affected.

=== Tropical Storm Alberto ===
- Tropical storm (SSHWS)
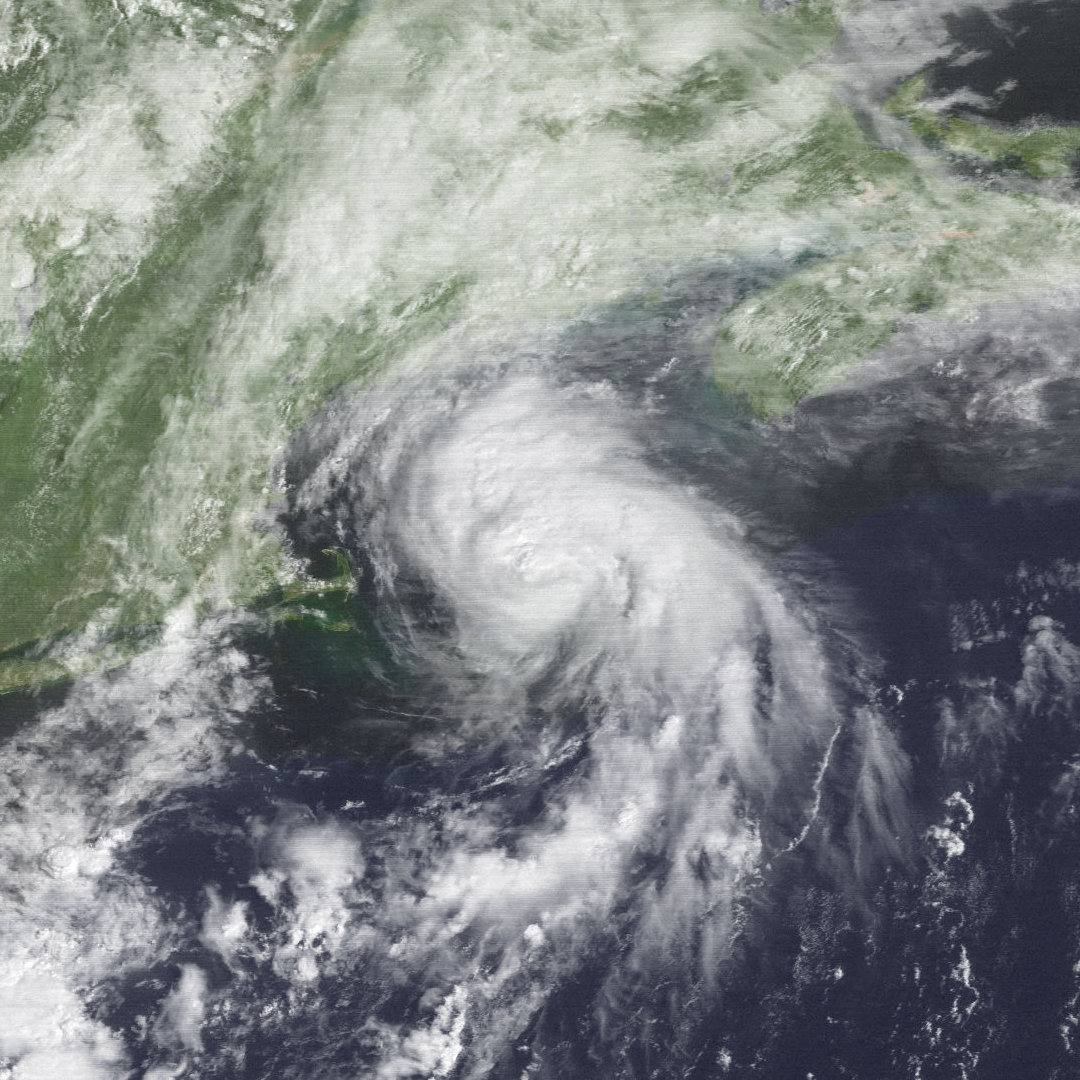
- Duration: August 5 – August 8
- Peak intensity: 40 mph (65 km/h) (1-min); 1002 mbar (hPa)

The season's first named storm originated on August 4 within a weak trough of low pressure that formed off the coast of South Carolina. The next day a low level circulation was detected by satellite, indicating that a tropical depression was forming. By August 6 the storm was designated the second tropical depression of the season. An approaching weak frontal trough pushed the depression northeastward and enhanced its upper-level outflow. On August 7 the system was designated Tropical Storm Alberto at 41.5°N, while located just south of Nantucket, Massachusetts, becoming the northernmost system to intensify into a tropical storm on record. (Note: Although Alberto intensified from a tropical depression to a tropical storm at a higher latitude than any other Atlantic system, it is not the northernmost formation of a tropical cyclone in the Atlantic. That record is held by an unnamed tropical storm in 1952 that formed at 42.0°N, and was not operationally recognized.) The storm accelerated northeastward at 29 mph (47 km/h) and struck western Nova Scotia that evening with little impact. On August 8 Alberto became extratropical over the cold waters of the Gulf of Saint Lawrence. Shortly thereafter it dissipated just north of Newfoundland.

The storm produced peak wind gusts of 48 mph (77 km/h) at Yarmouth, Nova Scotia. Rainfall reached 1.78 inches (45 mm) in Saint John, New Brunswick, most of which fell in a short amount of time. The rainfall caused localized flooding, which briefly closed some streets. The extratropical remnants of Alberto also produced light rain and some clouds along western Newfoundland.

=== Tropical Storm Beryl ===
- Tropical storm (SSHWS)
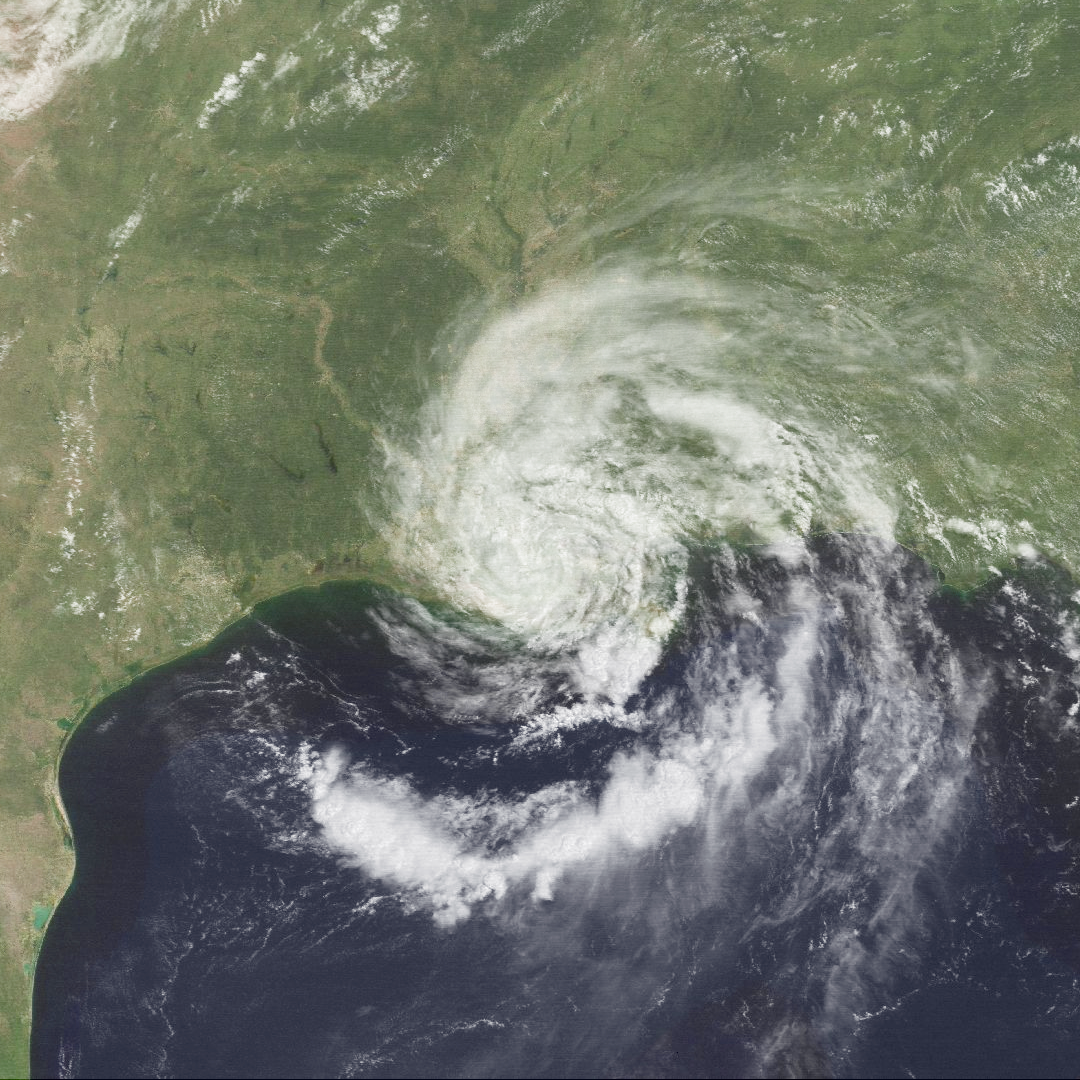
- Duration: August 8 – August 10
- Peak intensity: 50 mph (85 km/h) (1-min); 1001 mbar (hPa)

The third tropical depression of the season formed on August 7 from a surface low over southeastern Louisiana. The slow moving system organized as it drifted toward the mouth of the Mississippi River. It soon had enough convective organization for the National Hurricane Center (NHC) to issue an initial advisory on Tropical Depression Three. By August 8 surface winds increased enough to issue tropical storm warnings for Louisiana to the Florida Panhandle. Over the open Gulf, Beryl produced sustained winds of minimal tropical storm force and tropical storm force gusts over coastal Louisiana, Mississippi, and Alabama. Excessive rain fell along the central Gulf Coast, including local amounts of 16 in (410 mm) at Dauphin Island, Alabama.

Maintaining a well-structured outflow, Beryl's circulation on August 9 moved over warm water, where conditions were favorable for further intensification. However, a front approached from the northwest and reversed the storm's course into southeastern Louisiana. The next morning Beryl had weakened to a tropical depression as it moved over the Bayou Teche. Heavy downpours from system's remnants brought more than 12 in (300 mm) of rain to parts of eastern Texas. Overall damage from the storm was light, and only one known death was attributed to the storm.

=== Tropical Depression Four ===
- Tropical depression (SSHWS)
- Duration: August 13 – August 14
- Peak intensity: 35 mph (55 km/h) (1-min); 1012 mbar (hPa)

On August 12 a westward-moving tropical wave developed into Tropical Depression Four near the southern Bahamas. The depression tracked north-northwest along Florida's coast and made landfall near Jacksonville, Florida, the next day. The system spawned gusty winds and thunderstorms along the coasts of Florida and Georgia but caused little damage. The storm moved over south Georgia and the central Gulf Coast while dropping up to 7 in (180 mm) of rain on the Southeast. According to the National Weather Service, winds in some squalls to the north and east of the center reached up to 50 mph (80 km/h). The system finally dissipated as it reemerged over water near the mouth of the Mississippi.

Early predictions from hurricane forecasters said that the depression would strengthen into the season's third tropical storm. Because of unfavorable upper-level conditions and interaction with Bahama islands, the system lost its well defined center as it moved towards Florida's east coast.

=== Tropical Depression Five ===
- Tropical depression (SSHWS)
- Duration: August 20 – August 31
- Peak intensity: 35 mph (55 km/h) (1-min); 1006 mbar (hPa)

A tropical wave in the far eastern Atlantic developed into the fifth tropical depression on August 20. The storm drifted north-northwest of the Cape Verde islands for the next three days with little change in strength. Forecasters were concerned because the depression formed in the breeding ground where other powerful East Coast hurricanes have started. Though the storm was still very weak, they initially predicted it would strengthen.

By August 24 the depression's forward speed had increased to 15 mph (24 km/h) as its movement turned west. Cool ocean temperatures weakened the system and diminished its prospects for restrengthening, and on August 26, Tropical Depression Five degenerated into a tropical wave. The remnants redeveloped on August 30 about 180 miles (290 km) southeast of North Carolina, and the Washington office of the National Weather Service continued to track the system as a gale center until it merged with a front off the East Coast on September 1.

=== Tropical Depression Six ===
- Tropical depression (SSHWS)
- Duration: August 20 – August 24
- Peak intensity: 35 mph (55 km/h) (1-min); 1006 mbar (hPa)

Tropical Depression Six developed from a tropical wave that moved off the northwest African coast on August 12. The system crossed the tropical Atlantic as a wave until it began organizing near 55° W on August 19. The next day this system was designated a tropical depression while it approached the Windward Islands. After crossing the islands, the depression continued westward into the central Caribbean and encountered less-favorable conditions. Though poorly organized on August 21, the depression was expected to strengthen into a tropical storm over the western Caribbean's warmer waters. Nevertheless, it was downgraded to a tropical wave at 80° W near the island of Jamaica on August 23. The disturbance moved over Central America with minimal convection but redeveloped into Hurricane Kristy once it reached the eastern Pacific. The system's main effect on land was squally weather on the Windward Islands.

=== Tropical Storm Chris ===
- Tropical storm (SSHWS)
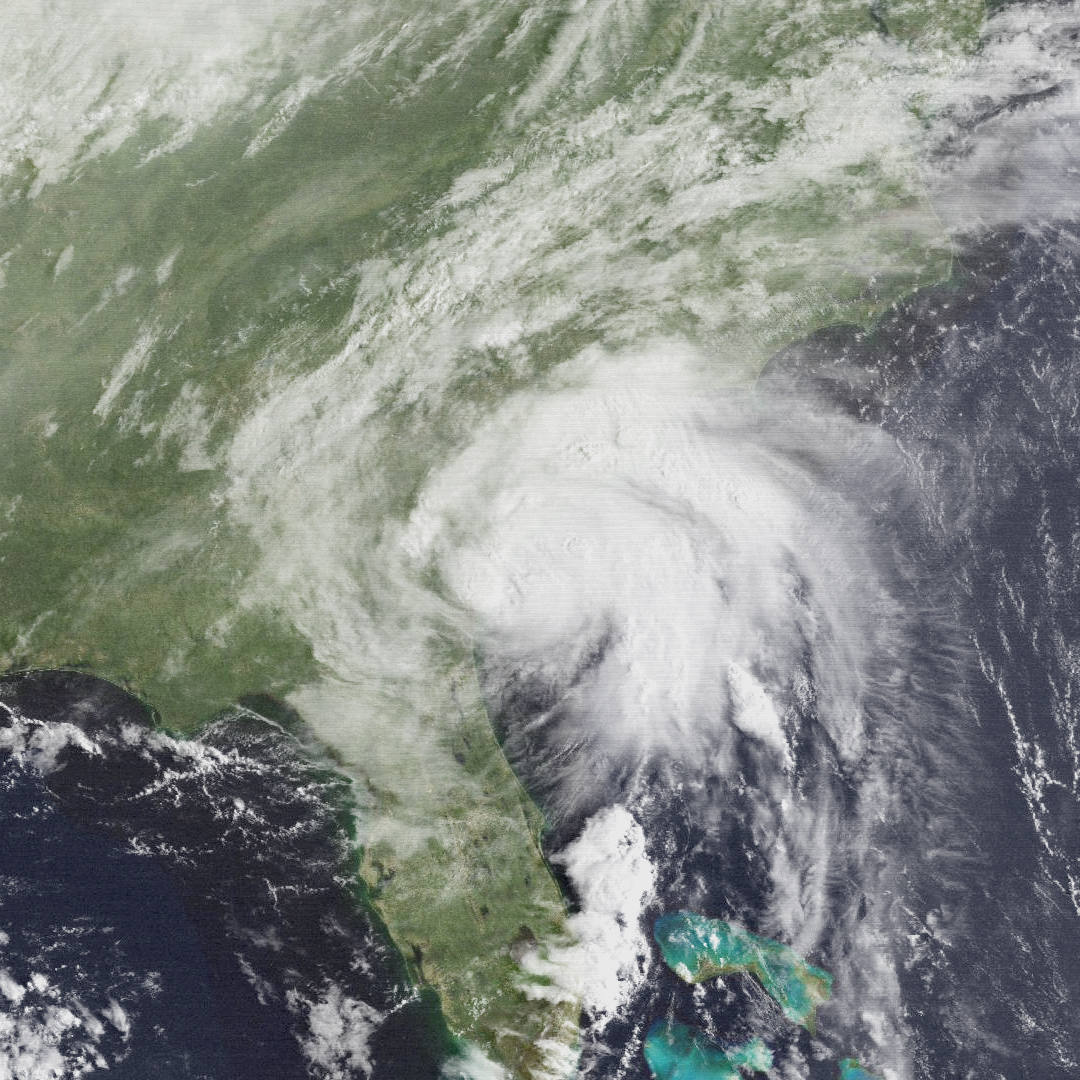
- Duration: August 21 – August 29
- Peak intensity: 50 mph (85 km/h) (1-min); 1005 mbar (hPa)

Chris formed from a strong tropical wave that moved off the west coast of Africa on August 15. By August 21 convection in the northern part of the wave detached and organized into Tropical Depression Seven. The storm tracked westward along the southern periphery of a subtropical high pressure ridge over the mid-Atlantic. For the next seven days, surface and reconnaissance observations found little evidence that the storm was strengthening. As a result, it remained a tropical depression as it moved across portions of the Lesser and Greater Antilles as well as the Bahamas.

The depression passed south of Puerto Rico on August 24 and dumped more than 14 in (360 mm) of rain on parts of the island. Three deaths in Puerto Rico were attributed to the weather. On August 28 the storm was upgraded to Tropical Storm Chris as it traveled northward just offshore of Florida. It made landfall near Savannah, Georgia, bringing light rain and wind damage to the area. Weakening to a depression, Chris poured heavy rains on South Carolina, where it merged with a cold front and became extratropical. The low accelerated over the Eastern Seaboard through Nova Scotia and finally dissipated on August 30. Heavy thunderstorms spawned a tornado in South Carolina that resulted in another death.

=== Hurricane Debby ===
- Category 1 hurricane (SSHWS)
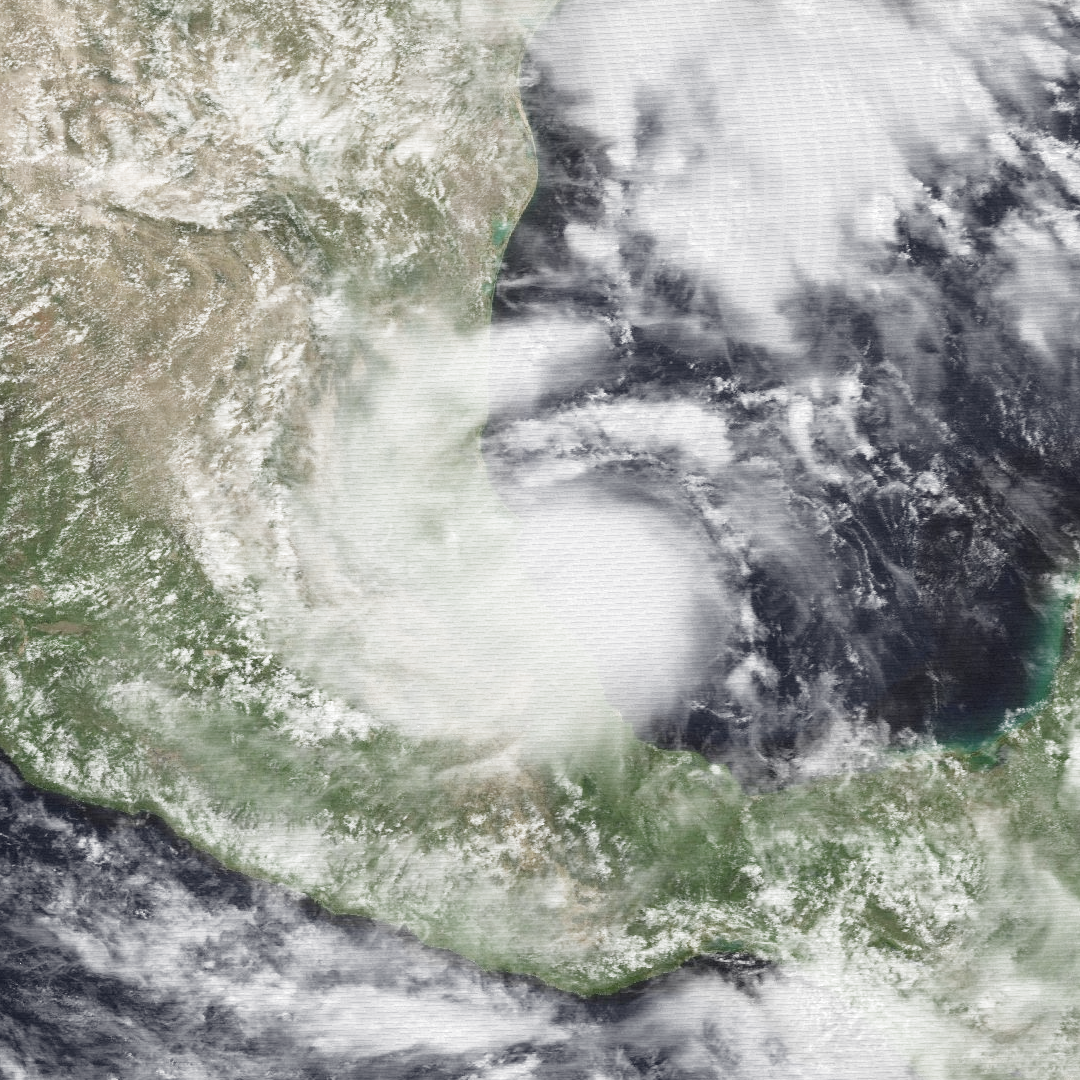
- Duration: August 31 – September 5 (Exited basin)
- Peak intensity: 75 mph (120 km/h) (1-min); 987 mbar (hPa)

Debby formed from the southern part of a tropical wave that became Tropical Storm Chris. In the mid-tropical Atlantic, the northern area of convection detached and became Tropical Depression Seven. The southern portion continued moving westward as a disorganized area of showers. The system did not develop until the low-level center emerged from the Yucatán into the Bay of Campeche on August 31. It is estimated that the storm became Tropical Depression Eight just offshore at around 12 p.m. local time.

Drifting west-northwest over the Gulf of Mexico, the depression organized and reached tropical storm-strength early on September 2. Later that day, based on observations from aircraft reconnaissance, Debby was upgraded to a hurricane. At peak intensity, the hurricane's center was just 30 mi (48 km) from the coast. With little change in intensity, Debby made landfall near Tuxpan, Veracruz, six hours later. The storm brought high winds, inland flooding, and mudslides and caused 10 deaths.

Debby weakened considerably over the Sierra Madre Oriental mountains, although the remnants continued moving across Mexico. The tight center tracked towards the Pacific coast and reemerged near Manzanillo on September 5. Upon entering the Eastern Pacific, the system became Tropical Depression Seventeen-E before dissipating in the Gulf of California on September 8.

=== Tropical Storm Ernesto ===
- Tropical storm (SSHWS)
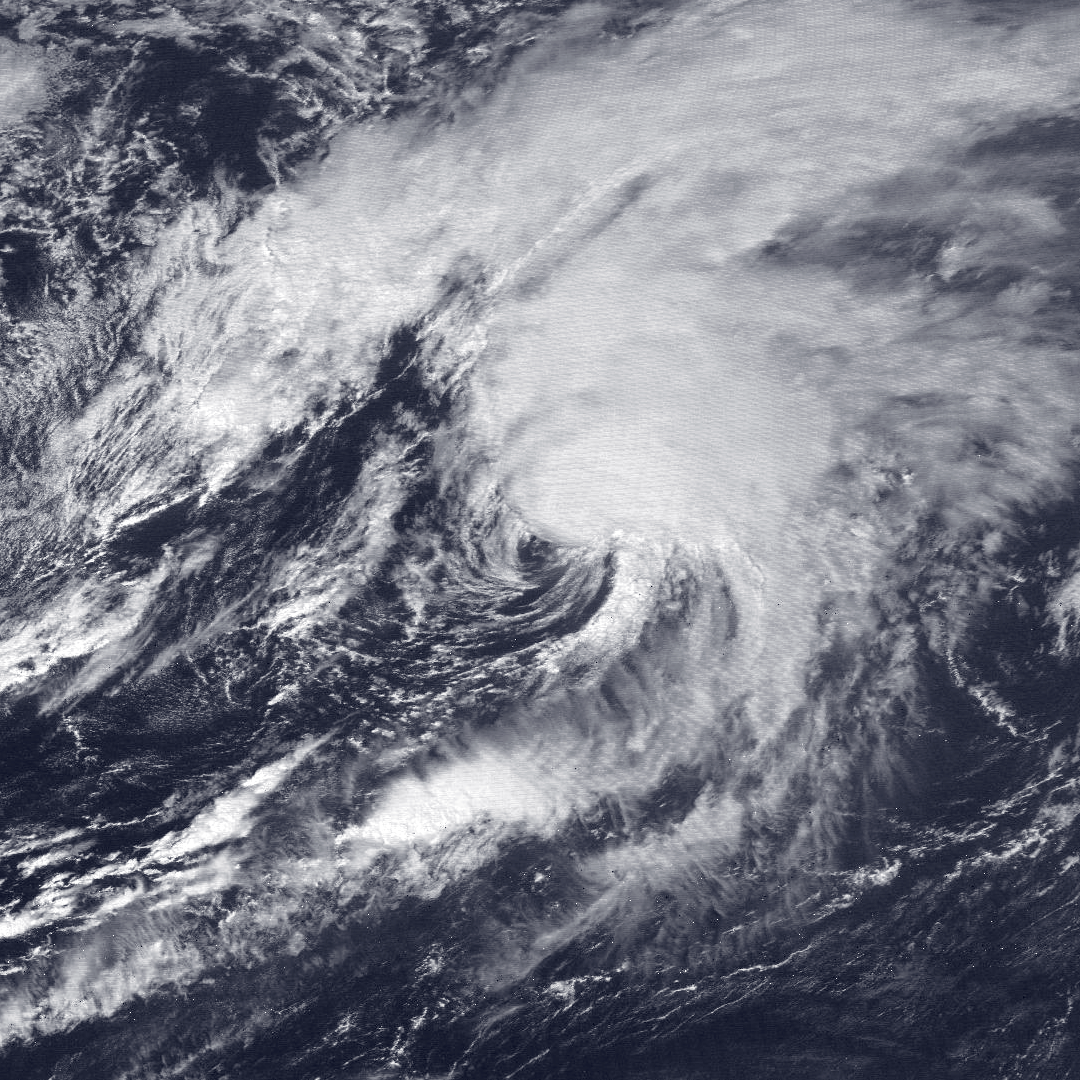
- Duration: September 3 – September 5
- Peak intensity: 65 mph (100 km/h) (1-min); 994 mbar (hPa)

On September 2 a cluster of thunderstorms associated with a northwestward-moving tropical wave developed a surface low near Bermuda. Though the surface low remained poorly defined and separate from the convection, the system became a tropical depression on September 3. Under the influence of southwesterlies, the depression accelerated northeastward at 50 mph (80 km/h). Late on September 3 it was upgraded to Tropical Storm Ernesto. The storm continued to strengthen as it lost tropical characteristics. A large extratropical storm over the North Atlantic absorbed Ernesto on September 5. The only land area affected by the storm was in the Azores, where it brought near storm-force winds to Flores Island.

=== Tropical Depression Ten ===
- Tropical depression (SSHWS)
- Duration: September 4 – September 4
- Peak intensity: 35 mph (55 km/h) (1-min); 1004 mbar (hPa)

A broad low-pressure area formed in the western Gulf of Mexico on September 2 and quickly developed through the next day. By September 3 convection was organized enough to declare the system a tropical depression about 160 mi (260 km) west-southwest of Morgan City, Louisiana. Forecasters issued tropical storm warnings for the coast from Cameron, Louisiana, to Apalachicola, Florida, while the storm moved rapidly northeastward at 15 to 20 mph (32 km/h). However, the depression degenerated a few hours later when it merged with the cold front that had caused its acceleration. Oil rigs in the Gulf of Mexico reported winds gusts to 40 mph (64 km/h), and moderate to heavy rains drenched large portions of southeast Texas and Louisiana. The wave dampened over the next 24 hours and brought heavy rain to the rest of the southeast, including a maximum of 8.4 in (210 mm) in Biloxi, Mississippi.

=== Unnamed tropical storm ===
- Tropical storm (SSHWS)
- Duration: September 7 – September 10
- Peak intensity: 60 mph (95 km/h) (1-min); 994 mbar (hPa)

A well-organized disturbance moved off the African coast on September 6 and rapidly developed into Tropical Depression Eleven. The NHC began issuing advisories on September 8 while it was 350 mi (560 km) northeast of Cape Verde. An after-the-fact review of satellite and ship reports indicated that the depression reached tropical storm-strength on September 7.

For three days, a large trough of low pressure northwest of the system steered it north-northwest towards cooler waters. Moderate to heavy rain was reported along the west coast of Africa, but no damage was reported. The system eventually weakened and merged with the low pressure trough. This unnamed storm was later added to the list of tropical storms in the annual summary for the Atlantic hurricane season.

=== Hurricane Florence ===
- Category 1 hurricane (SSHWS)
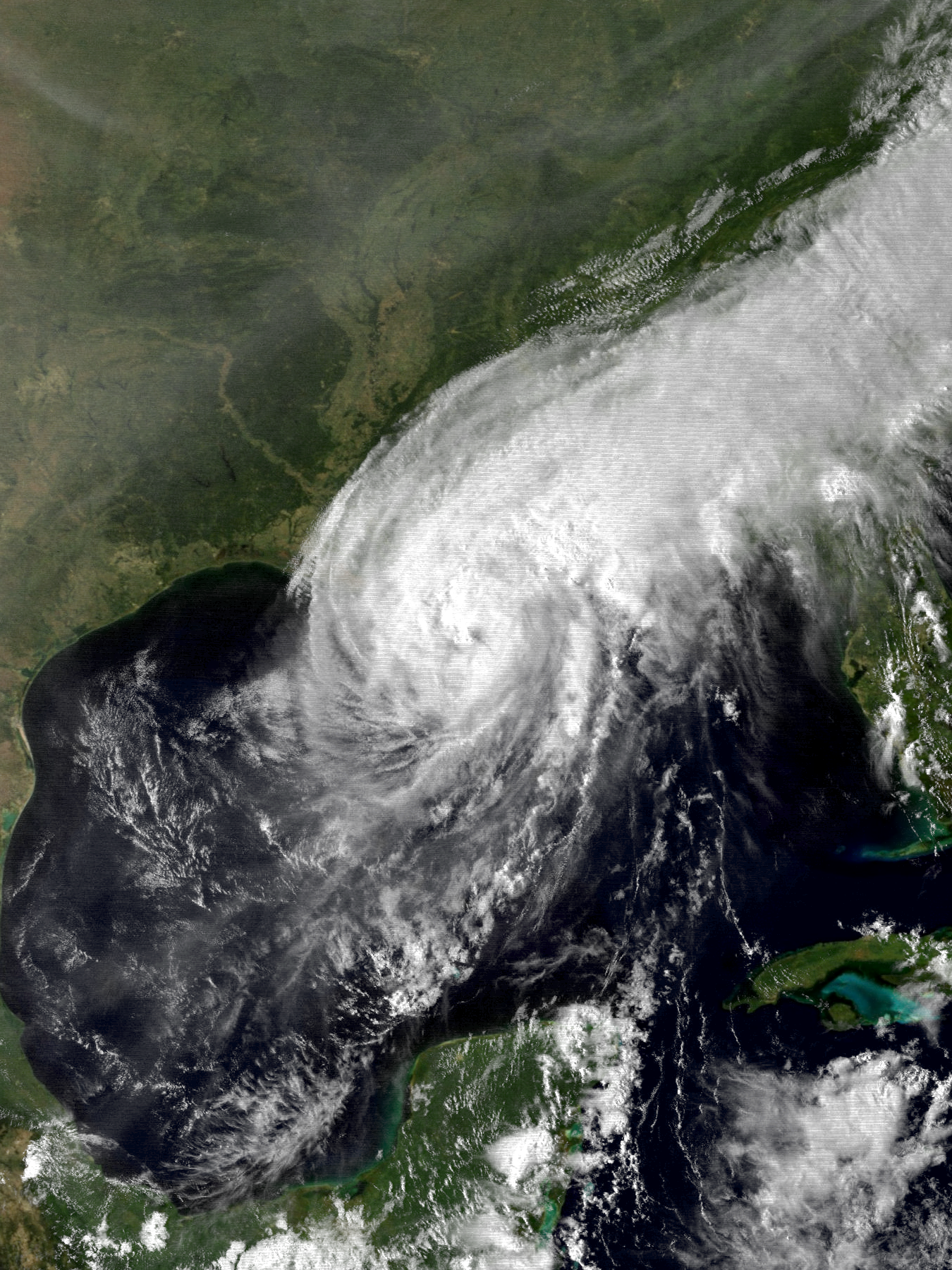
- Duration: September 7 – September 11
- Peak intensity: 80 mph (130 km/h) (1-min); 982 mbar (hPa)

A cloud band accompanying a cold front exited the coast of Texas into the Gulf of Mexico on September 4. The band split into two over the central Gulf when the southern portion stalled and the northern portion developed into a frontal wave that tracked northeastward. Convection over the southern portion increased and wrapped around the center of the cloud band. On September 7 the system formed a surface circulation, and tropical depression advisories began that day.

The depression drifted eastward under the influence of the dissipating frontal trough and intensified into Tropical Storm Florence, as confirmed by hurricane hunters. The storm turned northward on September 9 and accelerated toward the northern Gulf Coast under the influence of a mid- to upper-level trough. Florence became a hurricane just hours before landfall on the western Mississippi Delta. The storm rapidly weakened over southeastern Louisiana and lost all its deep convection as it passed over the New Orleans area. Florence became a depression on September 10 near Baton Rouge and dissipated the next day over northeast Texas.

Early in its duration the system dropped moderate amounts of rainfall across the Yucatán Peninsula. Upon striking Louisiana, storm surge water levels rose moderately above normal just east of where the center moved ashore. Gusty winds caused power outages to more than 100,000 people. In Alabama one man died while trying to secure his boat. Rainfall from the hurricane caused severe river flooding in portions of the Florida Panhandle in an area already severely affected by heavy rainfall, and the flooding damaged or destroyed dozens of houses in Santa Rosa County.

=== Hurricane Gilbert ===
- Category 5 hurricane (SSHWS)
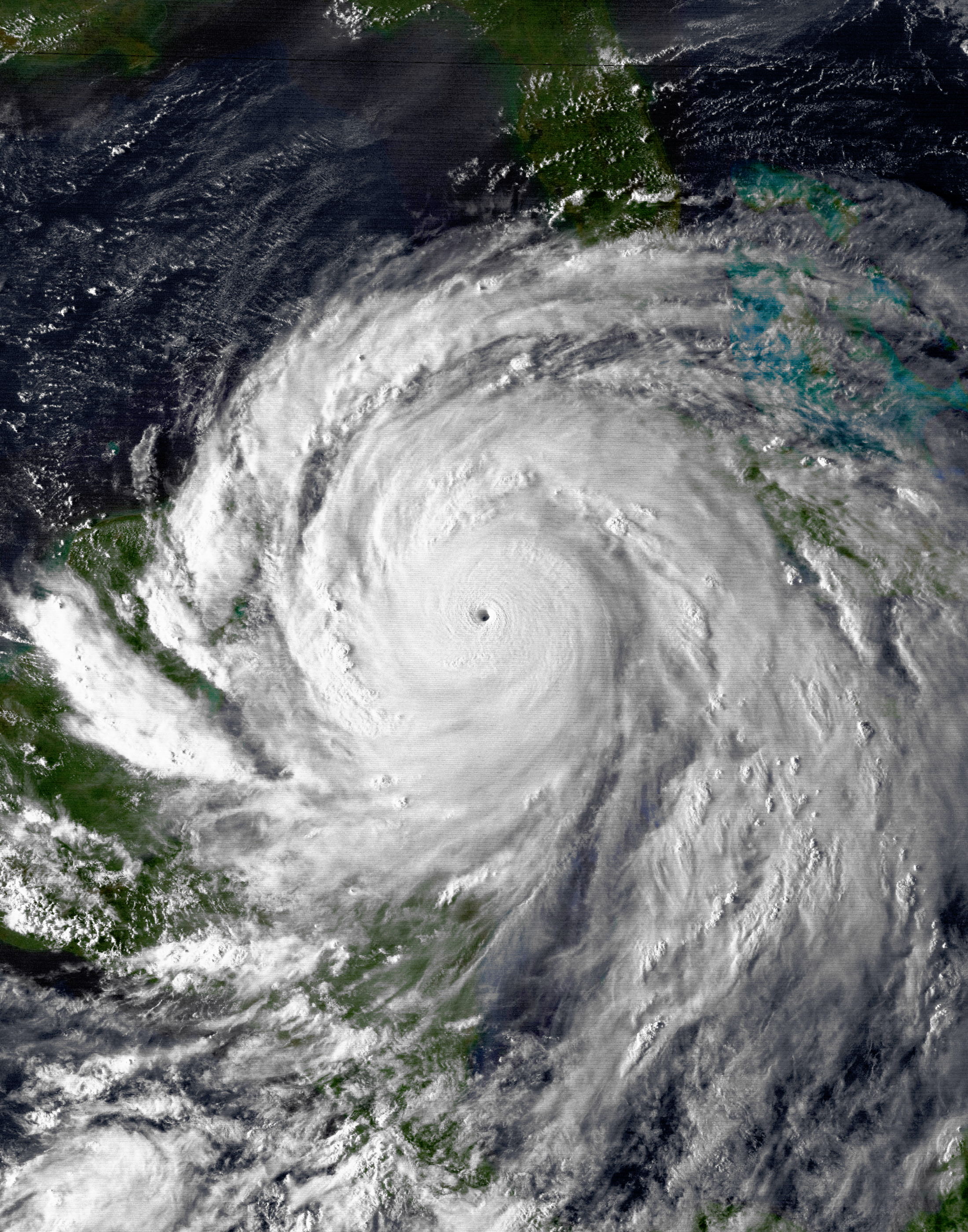
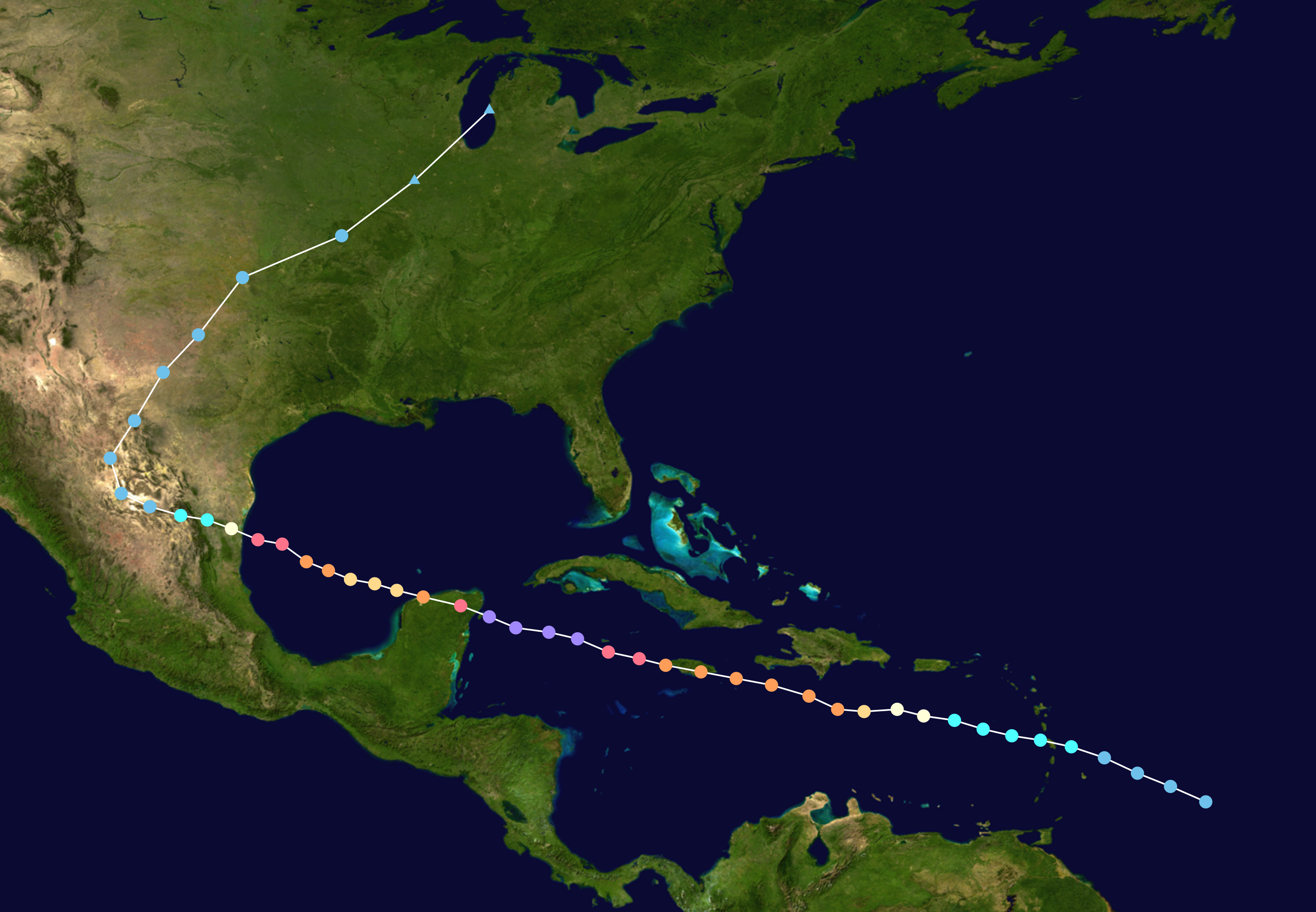
- Duration: September 8 – September 19
- Peak intensity: 185 mph (295 km/h) (1-min); 888 mbar (hPa)

The 13th tropical depression formed from a tropical wave just east of the Lesser Antilles on September 8. As it moved west-northwest, the depression strengthened into Tropical Storm Gilbert on September 9, shortly before passing over Guadeloupe. The tropical storm turned west and rapidly intensified to a major hurricane on September 11. Gilbert continued to strengthen as it brushed the southern coast of Hispaniola. It passed directly over Jamaica as a Category 3 hurricane. The cyclone became the first to strike Jamaica at hurricane intensity since Charlie in 1951. When the center reemerged over water, Gilbert rapidly intensified again. On September 13, the central pressure dropped 72 mb (2.1 inHg), the fastest deepening of an Atlantic hurricane on record until 2005's Hurricane Wilma. Gilbert's pressure of 888 mb (26.2 inHg) at the time was the lowest sea-level pressure ever recorded in the Western Hemisphere, and the lowest in the Atlantic basin until Wilma.

Gilbert weakened slightly before landfall on the Yucatán Peninsula, although it struck at Category 5 strength. Until 2007's Hurricane Dean, Gilbert was the most recent storm to make landfall as a Category 5 hurricane in Mexico. As the eye moved over land, the storm rapidly lost strength, reemerging on September 15 in the Gulf of Mexico as a Category 2 hurricane. Hurricane Gilbert continued its northwest track and restrengthened to a minimal Category 4 hurricane. On September 16, Gilbert made its final landfall in northeast Mexico near the town of La Pesca with maximum sustained winds of 125 mph (201 km/h). The center passed south of Monterrey, Mexico, on September 17 and brought heavy flooding to the city. Gilbert's remnants turned north and eventually merged with a developing frontal low pressure system over Missouri.

The storm caused $2.98 billion in damage and 318 deaths across the Caribbean and into Central America, with Jamaica and Mexico particularly hard hit. In the former, heavy rains and strong winds destroyed or damaged crops, roads, small aircraft, and structures, including nearly 240,000 low-incoming housing units and about 95% of health care facilities. Extensive argicultural losses were also reported, especially to banana crops and the poultry industry. At least $800 million in damage and 45 fatalities occurred on Jamaica, while sources such as the NHC place the damage total closer to $2 billion. In Mexico, wind gusts may have reached 200 mph (320 km/h) in the Yucatán Peninsula, although no wind reports from the country are known. Gilbert destroyed over 60,000 homes throughout the country. Overall, 202 deaths and $2 billion in damage occurred in Mexico. Flooding in the Monterrey metropolitan area led to many of those fatalities. A large tornado outbreak was reported in the United States, with Storm Data documenting 47 twisters – 41 in Texas, 3 in Alabama, 2 in Mississippi, and 1 each in Louisiana and Oklahoma.

=== Hurricane Helene ===
- Category 4 hurricane (SSHWS)
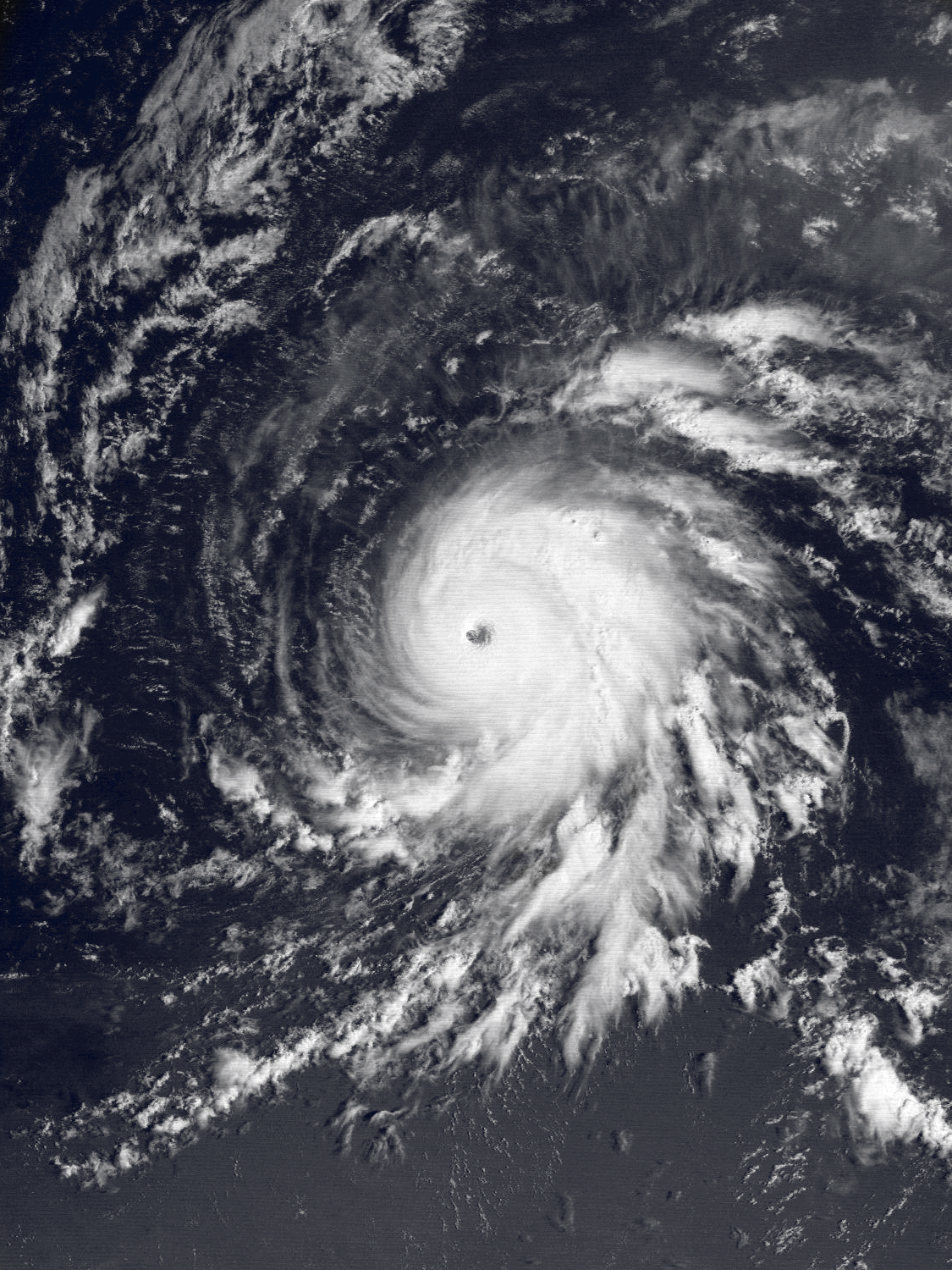
- Duration: September 19 – September 30
- Peak intensity: 145 mph (230 km/h) (1-min); 938 mbar (hPa)

A tropical wave with deeply organized convection crossed the coast of Africa on September 15. The system was forced west due to a strong ridge in the eastern Atlantic. On September 19 at 18:00 UTC, the system was upgraded to Tropical Depression Fourteen. By 06:00 UTC on September 20, the depression was strengthened, and was upgraded to Tropical Storm Helene. Helene began to turn to the northwest on September 21 due to a major trough in the eastern Atlantic. Later on September 21, Helene intensified into a hurricane. Favorable conditions allowed the storm to continue strengthening, and on September 22, Helene became a major hurricane. Late on the following day, Helene attained its peak intensity; maximum sustained winds were at 145 mph (233 km/h) and the minimum pressure of 938 mbar (27.7 inHg).

After reaching peak intensity, Helene weakened as it tracked generally northward through the open Atlantic. By early on September 29, Helene briefly restrengthened into a Category 2 hurricane and reached a secondary peak of 105 mph (169 km/h). However, later that day, Helene weakened back to a Category 1 hurricane while accelerating to the northeast. At 12:00 UTC on September 30, Helene transitioned into an extratropical cyclone while centered well south of Iceland. The precursor tropical wave produced thunderstorms and gusty winds ranging between 23 and 34 mph (37 and 55 km/h) in Cape Verde on September 17.

=== Tropical Depression Fifteen ===
- Tropical depression (SSHWS)
- Duration: September 27 – September 29
- Peak intensity: 30 mph (45 km/h) (1-min); 1009 mbar (hPa)

While Hurricane Helene was spinning in the central Atlantic, a tropical wave that moved off the coast of Africa in late September rapidly organized. On September 27 the storm became the fifteenth tropical depression of the season while it was about 265 mi (426 km) south-southeast of Cape Verde. The depression tracked westward at 15 to 20 mph (32 km/h) but weakened rapidly. The next day it was downgraded to a tropical wave while still in the far eastern Atlantic, and never reformed in the Atlantic.

=== Tropical Storm Isaac ===
- Tropical storm (SSHWS)
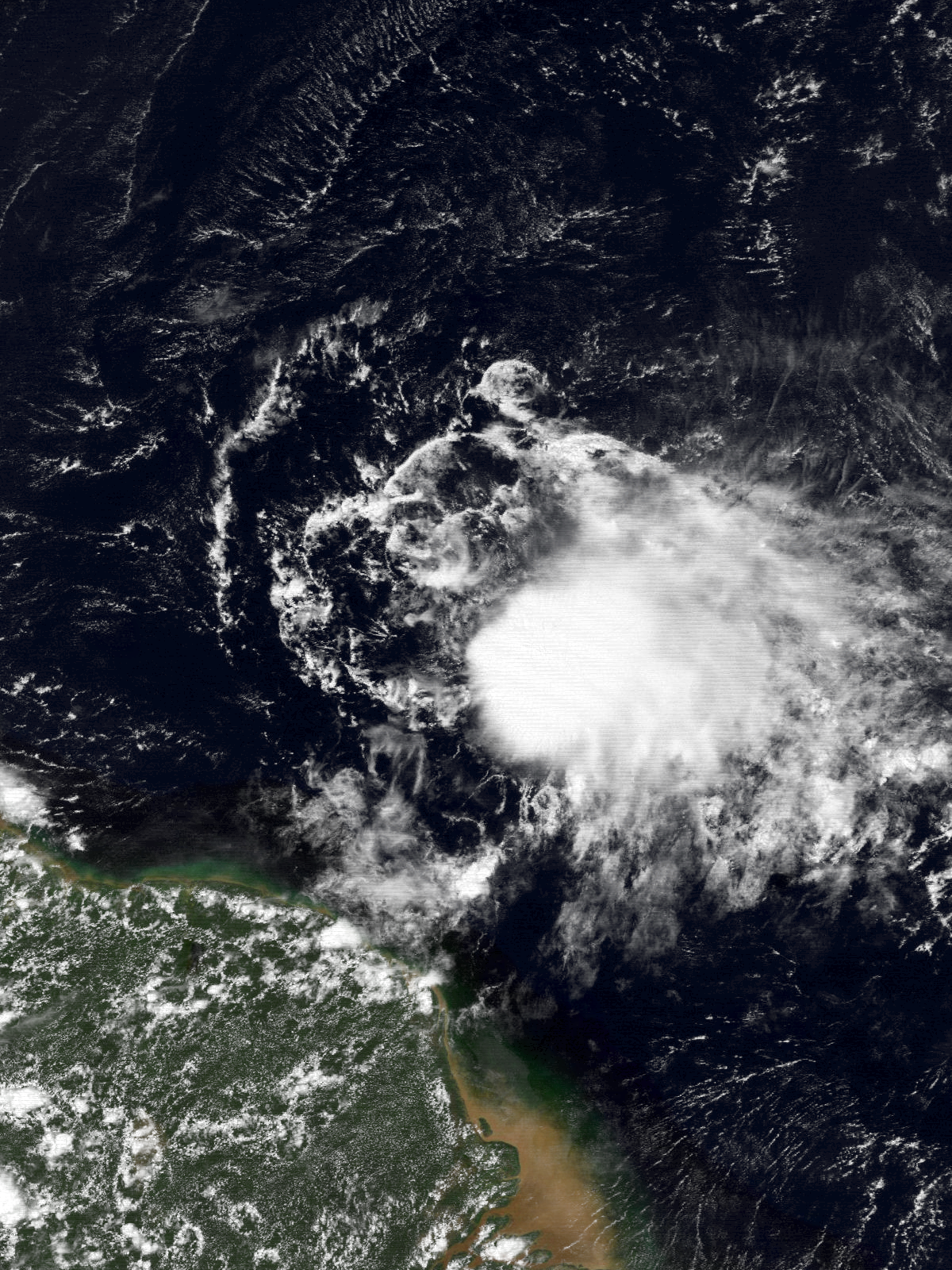
- Duration: September 28 – October 1
- Peak intensity: 45 mph (75 km/h) (1-min); 1005 mbar (hPa)

A tropical wave moved off the coast of Africa on September 23. It traveled westward at a low latitude along the Intertropical Convergence Zone (or ITCZ), and its convection gradually grew more organized. On September 29 it was identified as Tropical Depression Sixteen about 900 mi (1,400 km) southeast of Barbados. The westward path of the storm shifted two degrees northward, possibly as a result of the formation of a new center. On September 30 the depression was upgraded when an Air Force reconnaissance plane discovered tropical storm-force winds. Westerly vertical wind shear prevented deep convection at the center of the storm. As Isaac approached the islands, northern parts of the Lesser Antilles were issued tropical storm warnings. Nevertheless, the storm lasted only a short time in the shearing environment. Isaac was downgraded to a depression on October 1 and completely dissipated shortly thereafter. The remnants of Isaac eventually regenerated in the eastern Pacific Ocean basin as Tropical Depression Twenty-E.

As a tropical cyclone, Isaac did not significantly affect land. However, the remnants dropped heavy rainfall across Trinidad and Tobago, causing flooding and mudslides that injured 20 people and left at least 30 homeless. Flash flooding in Morvant killed two people. Across the country, the storm damaged roads and bridges.

=== Hurricane Joan ===
- Category 4 hurricane (SSHWS)
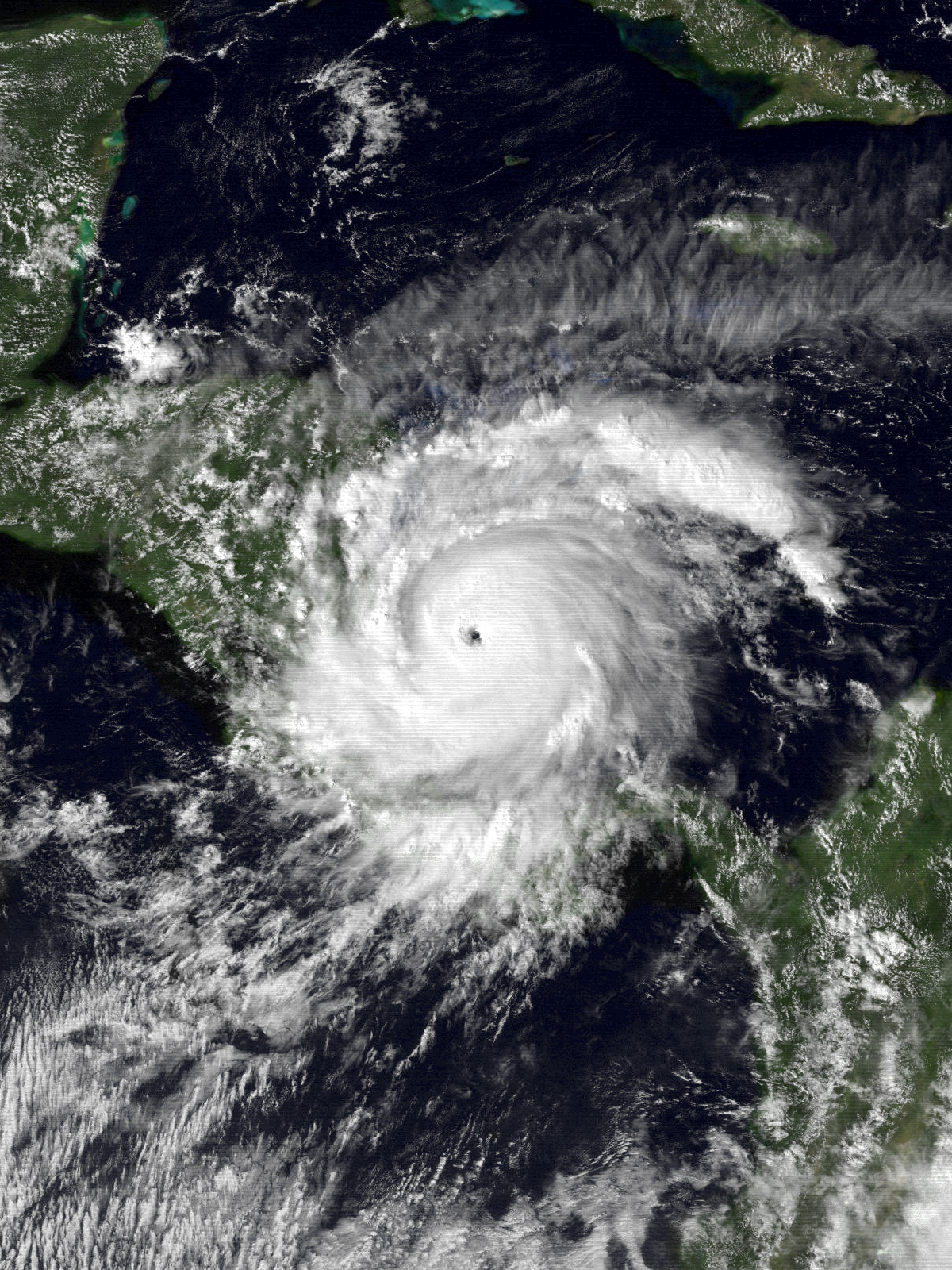
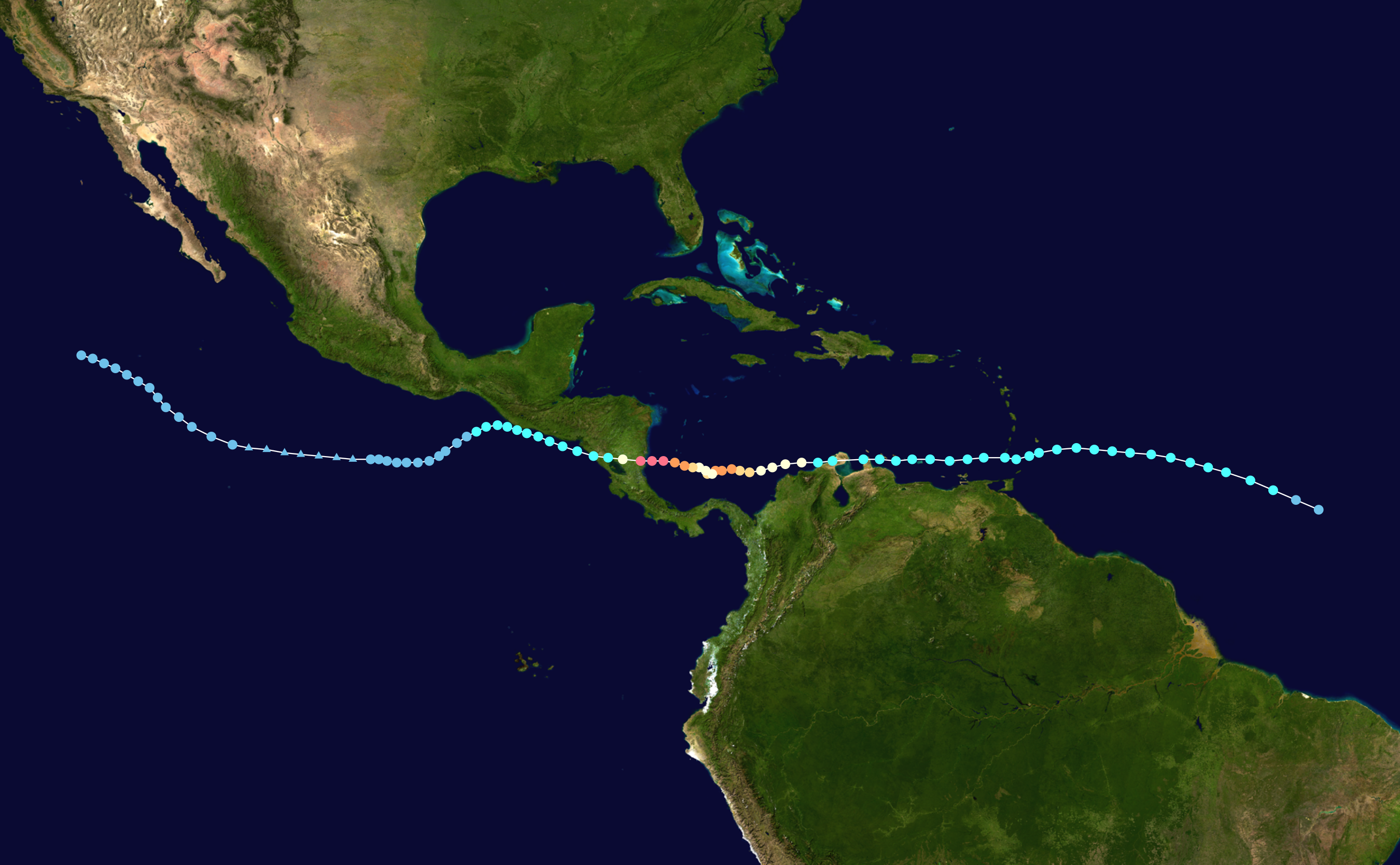
- Duration: October 10 – October 23 (Exited basin)
- Peak intensity: 145 mph (230 km/h) (1-min); 932 mbar (hPa)

On October 10, the 17th tropical depression of the season organized from a disturbance in the ITCZ. For the next two days the system traveled northwest while it strengthened into Tropical Storm Joan. After passing through the southern Lesser Antilles, Joan traveled westward along the South American coast as a minimal tropical storm. It crossed the Guajira Peninsula on October 17 and quickly attained hurricane strength just 30 mi (48 km) from the coast. Hurricane Joan strengthened into a major hurricane on October 19 while drifting westward. The hurricane executed a tight cyclonic loop in which it weakened greatly but rapidly strengthened upon resuming its westward track. Joan reached its peak intensity just before making landfall near Bluefields, Nicaragua, on October 22 as a Category 4 hurricane. Joan at the time was the southernmost Category 4 hurricane ever recorded, but this record has since been broken by Hurricane Ivan. Joan remained well organized as it crossed Nicaragua and emerged in the eastern Pacific Ocean basin as Tropical Storm Miriam. Miriam gradually weakened until dissipating on November 2.

Hurricane Joan killed 148 people in Nicaragua and 68 others in affected nations. The hurricane damage in Nicaragua amounted to half of the $1.87 billion total. Joan also brought heavy rainfall and mudslides to countries along the extreme southern Caribbean. Its track along the northern coast of South America was very rare; Joan was one of only a few Atlantic tropical cyclones to move in this way. Joan was also the first tropical cyclone to cross from the Atlantic basin since Hurricane Greta of 1978.

=== Tropical Depression Eighteen ===
- Tropical depression (SSHWS)
- Duration: October 19 – October 21
- Peak intensity: 35 mph (55 km/h) (1-min); 1006 mbar (hPa)

A westward-moving tropical wave, that left the coast of Africa in early October, tracked closely behind Hurricane Joan through the southern Caribbean. In an unusual occurrence the disturbance developed into the 18th tropical depression about 500 mi (800 km) behind the powerful hurricane. An Air Force reconnaissance check of tropical weather on October 19 spotted the depression near Colombia's Guajira Peninsula. Hurricane Joan's small size allowed the depression to remain out-of-reach as it developed. However, the outflow of the hurricane sheared the depression and sapped its energy. The system gradually dissipated on October 21 while Joan was experiencing rapid strengthening just before its arrival on the coast of Nicaragua. The depression brought heavy rain to the Netherlands Antilles. News reports blamed Tropical Depression Eighteen and other tropical systems for bringing swarms of pink locusts from Africa to Trinidad and other Caribbean nations.

=== Tropical Storm Keith ===
- Tropical storm (SSHWS)
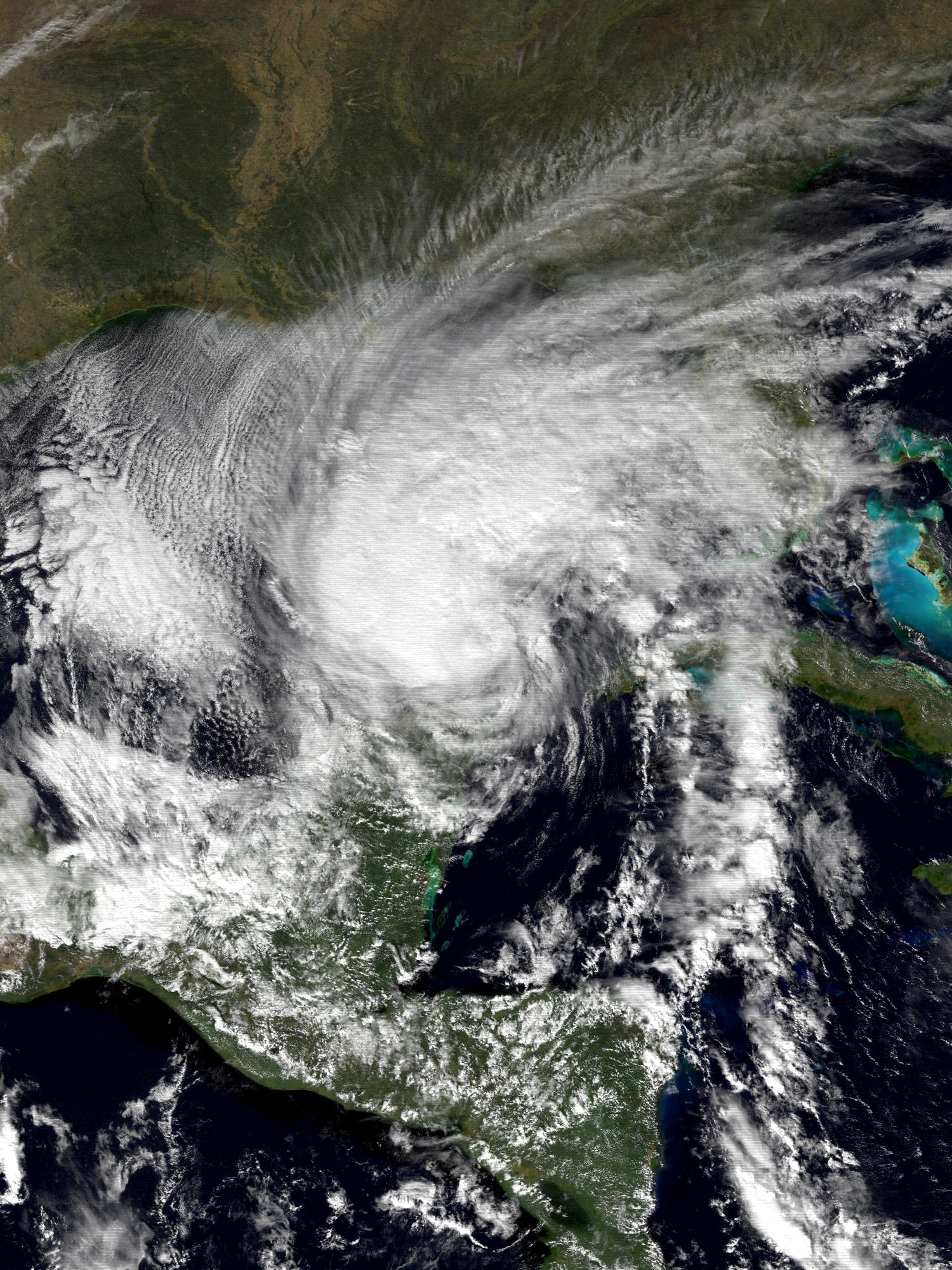
- Duration: November 17 – November 24
- Peak intensity: 70 mph (110 km/h) (1-min); 985 mbar (hPa)

The last storm of the season formed from a tropical wave on November 17 to the south of Haiti. It moved westward through the Caribbean and became organized enough to attain tropical storm status on November 20. Keith rapidly organized and peaked with winds of 70 mph (110 km/h) before making landfall on the northeastern portion of the Yucatán Peninsula on November 21. An upper-level trough forced it to the northeast, where upper-level shear and cooler drier air weakened it to minimal storm strength in a pattern typical for November. Keith restrengthened over the southeastern Gulf of Mexico and struck near Sarasota, Florida, on November 23. After crossing the state, it became extratropical on November 24 near Bermuda and became an intense extratropical system over the Atlantic with sustained winds of minimal hurricane force.

Early in its duration Keith produced moderate to heavy rainfall in Honduras, Jamaica, and Cuba. Minimal damage was reported in Mexico, still recovering from the devastating effects of Hurricane Gilbert two months earlier. Keith, the last of four named tropical cyclones to hit the United States during the season, produced moderate rainfall, a rough storm surge, and gusty winds across central Florida. Overall damage was widespread but fairly minor, totaling about $7.3 million. Damage near the coast occurred mainly from storm surge and beach erosion, while damage further inland was limited to flooding and downed trees and power lines. No fatalities were reported.

== Storm names ==
The following list of names was used for named storms that formed in the north Atlantic in 1988. This is the same list used for the 1982 season as no names were retired from that year. Storms were named Gilbert, Isaac, Joan and Keith for the first (and only in the cases of Gilbert and Joan) time in 1988. The names Florence and Helene had been previously used under the old naming convention.

- Alberto
- Beryl
- Chris
- Debby
- Ernesto
- Florence
- Gilbert
- Helene
- Isaac
- Joan
- Keith
- Leslie (unused)
- Michael (unused)
- Nadine (unused)
- Oscar (unused)
- Patty (unused)
- Rafael (unused)
- Sandy (unused)
- Tony (unused)
- Valerie (unused)
- William (unused)

=== Retirement ===
The World Meteorological Organization retired the names Gilbert and Joan from the rotating Atlantic hurricane name lists after the 1988 season on account of their severity. They were replaced with Gordon and Joyce for the 1994 season.

== Season effects ==
This is a table of all of the storms that formed in the 1988 Atlantic hurricane season. It includes their name, duration (within the basin), peak classification and intensities, areas affected, damage, and death totals. Deaths in parentheses are additional and indirect (an example of an indirect death would be a traffic accident), but were still related to that storm. Damage and deaths include totals while the storm was extratropical, a wave, or a low, and all of the damage figures are in 1988 USD.

Saffir–Simpson scale
TD	TS	C1	C2	C3	C4	C5

1988 Atlantic hurricane season season statistics
Storm name	Dates active	Storm category at peak intensity	Max 1-min wind mph (km/h)	Min. press. (mbar)	Areas affected	Damage (US$)	Deaths	Ref(s).
One	May 31 – June 2	Tropical depression	30 (45)	1002	Greater Antilles	Unknown	37	
Alberto	August 5 – 8	Tropical storm	40 (65)	1002	East Coast of the United States, Atlantic Canada	None	None	
Beryl	August 5 – 8	Tropical storm	40 (65)	1002	Gulf Coast of the United States	$3 million	1	
Four	August 13 – 14	Tropical depression	35 (55)	1012	Florida	None	None	
Five	August 20 – 31	Tropical depression	35 (55)	1006	None	None	None	
Six	August 20 – 24	Tropical depression	35 (55)	1006	Windward Islands	None	None	
Chris	August 21 – 29	Tropical storm	50 (85)	1005	Leeward Islands, Greater Antilles, East Coast of the United States, Atlantic Canada	$2.2 million	6	
Debby	August 31 – September 8	Category 1 hurricane	75 (120)	987	Yucatan Peninsula, Eastern Mexico	Unknown	20	
Ernesto	September 3 – 5	Tropical storm	65 (100)	994	None	None	None	
Ten	September 4	Tropical depression	35 (55)	1004	Gulf Coast of the United States	None	None	
Unnamed	September 7 – 10	Tropical storm	60 (95)	994	Cape Verde	None	None	
Florence	September 7 – 11	Category 1 hurricane	80 (130)	982	Yucatan Peninsula, Gulf Coast of the United States	$2.9 million	1	
Gilbert	September 8 – 19	Category 5 hurricane	185 (295)	888	Lesser Antilles, Greater Antilles, Central America, Yucatan Peninsula, South Central, Midwestern and Western Canada	$2.98 billion	318	
Helene	September 19 – 30	Category 4 hurricane	145 (230)	938	None	None	None	
Fifteen	September 27 – 29	Tropical depression	30 (45)	1009	None	None	None	
Isaac	September 28 – October 1	Tropical storm	45 (75)	1005	Trinidad and Tobago	Unknown	2	
Joan	October 10 – 23	Category 4 hurricane	145 (230)	932	Windward Islands, Aruba, Bonaire, Curaçao, Colombia, Venezuela, Central America	$2 billion	216–334	
Eighteen	October 19 – 21	Tropical depression	35 (55)	1006	Netherlands Antilles, Trinidad	None	None	
Keith	November 17 – 24	Tropical storm	70 (110)	985	Central America, Yucatán Peninsula, Greater Antilles, Southeastern United States, Southeast United States, Bermuda	$7.3 million	None	
Season aggregates
19 systems	May 31 – November 24		185 (295)	888		$4.99 billion	601–719	

== See also ==
- 1988 Pacific hurricane season
- 1988 Pacific typhoon season
- 1988 North Indian Ocean cyclone season
- South-West Indian Ocean cyclone seasons: 1987–88, 1988–89
- Australian region cyclone seasons: 1987–88, 1988–89
- South Pacific cyclone seasons: 1987–88, 1988–89
- South Atlantic tropical cyclone
- Mediterranean tropical-like cyclone
