= Timeline of the 1988 Pacific hurricane season =

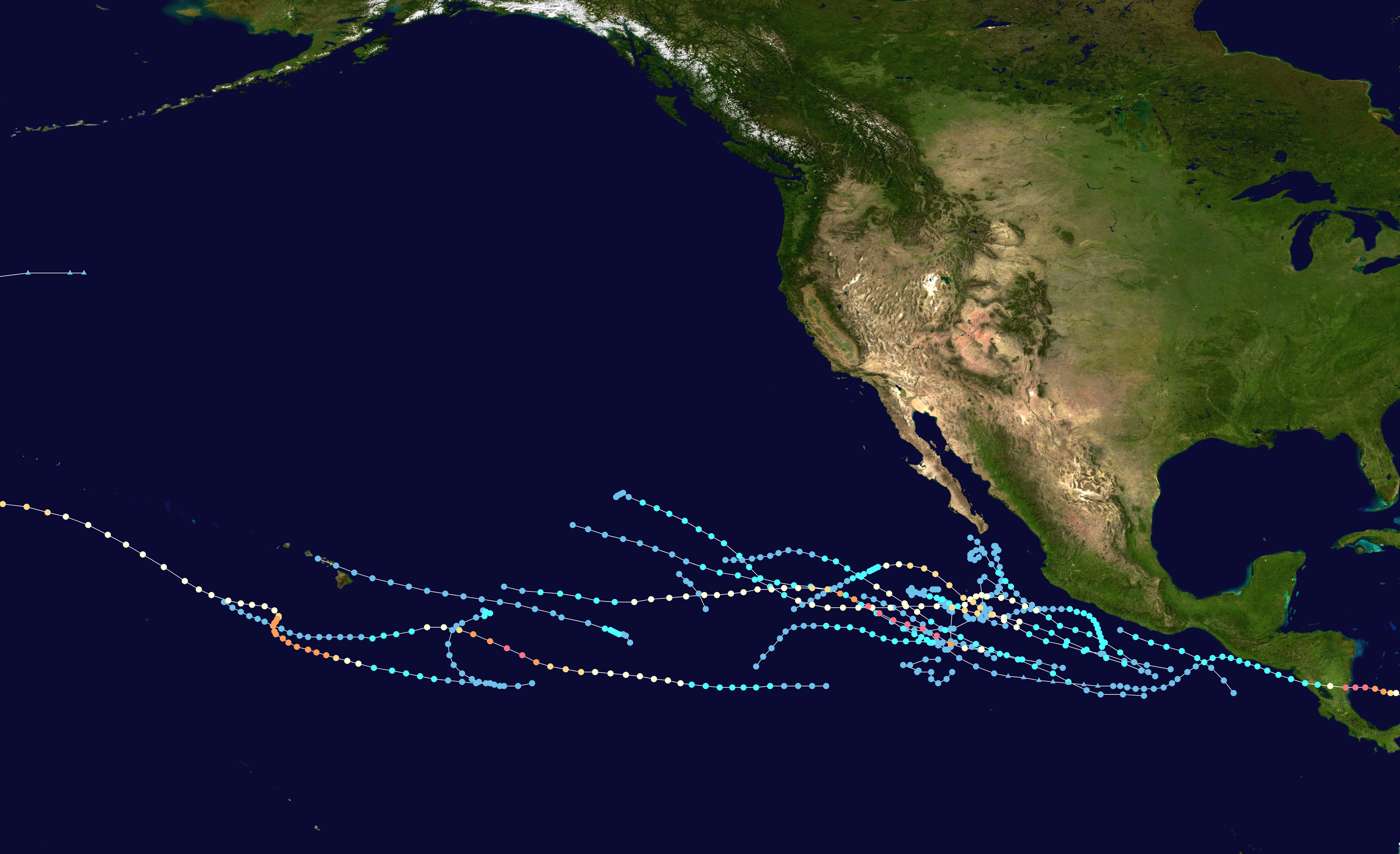
- Season summary map

Season boundaries
- First system formed: June 15, 1988
- Last system dissipated: November 2, 1988

Strongest system
- Name: Hector
- Maximum winds: 145 mph (230 km/h) (1-minute sustained)
- Lowest pressure: 935 mbar (hPa; 27.61 inHg)

Longest lasting system
- Name: Fabio
- Duration: 12.25 days
Storm articles
- Hurricane Uleki
- Hurricane Debby (1988)
- Hurricane Joan–Miriam

The 1988 Pacific hurricane season was the annual cycle of tropical cyclone formation over the Pacific Ocean north of the equator and east of the International Date Line. The season officially began on May 15 in the Eastern Pacific basin proper (east of 140°W) and June 1 in the Central Pacific basin (140°W to the International Date Line), and ended on November 30 in both areas. This is historically the period during which most tropical cyclogenesis occurs in these respective areas. The first system, Tropical Depression One-E, formed on June 15; the final system, Tropical Storm Miriam, dissipated on November 2.

The 1988 season was the first in which the Eastern Pacific proper was within the National Hurricane Center's (NHC) area of responsibility; the region was previously under the purview of the Eastern Pacific Hurricane Center, which was assimilated into the NHC following the 1987 season. Activity during the season was generally near average. (Note: During the period from 1981 to 2010, an average Pacific hurricane season generated 15.4 tropical storms, 8.4 hurricanes, and 3.9 major hurricanes.) A total of 15 named tropical storms developed, including two which formed in the Central Pacific basin and one which crossed over from the Atlantic basin while still at tropical storm strength. Seven storms strengthened into hurricanes, three of which became major hurricanes by reaching Category 3 or higher on the five-level Saffir–Simpson scale. Five systems existed in the Central Pacific basin in 1988, including Tropical Storm Gilma, which became the only system to make landfall when it struck Hawaii after weakening into a tropical depression. There were eight tropical depressions which remained below tropical storm strength, including one which crossed over from the Atlantic basin.

This timeline documents tropical cyclone formations, strengthenings, weakenings, landfalls, and dissipations during the season. It includes information that was not released during the season, meaning that data from post-storm reviews by the NHC and the Central Pacific Hurricane Center (CPHC) has been included.

The time stamp for each event is first stated using Coordinated Universal Time (UTC), the 24-hour clock where 00:00 = midnight UTC. The NHC uses both UTC and the time zone where the center of the tropical cyclone was then located. Prior to 2015, two time zones were utilized in the Eastern Pacific basin: Pacific for the Eastern Pacific proper, and Hawaii−Aleutian for the Central Pacific. In this timeline, the respective area time is included in parentheses. Additionally, figures for maximum sustained winds and position estimates are rounded to the nearest 5 units (miles, or kilometers), following NHC practice. Direct wind observations are rounded to the nearest whole number. Atmospheric pressures are listed to the nearest millibar and nearest hundredth of an inch of mercury.

== Timeline of events ==
=== May ===
There were no tropical cyclones in May.

May 15

- The 1988 Eastern Pacific hurricane season officially begins.

=== June ===
June 1

- The 1988 Central Pacific hurricane season officially begins.

June 15

- 12:00 UTC (5:00 a.m. PDT) at 13.0°N 112.0°W – Tropical Depression One-E develops from an area of unsettled weather while located about 695 mi (1,120 km) south of the southern tip of the Baja California peninsula. It is already at its peak intensity, with maximum sustained winds of 35 mph (55 km/h) and an unknown central pressure.

June 16

- 18:00 UTC (11:00 a.m. PDT) at 14.3°N 101.4°W – Tropical Depression Two-E develops from a tropical wave while located about 200 mi (325 km) south-southwest of Acapulco, Guerrero.

June 17

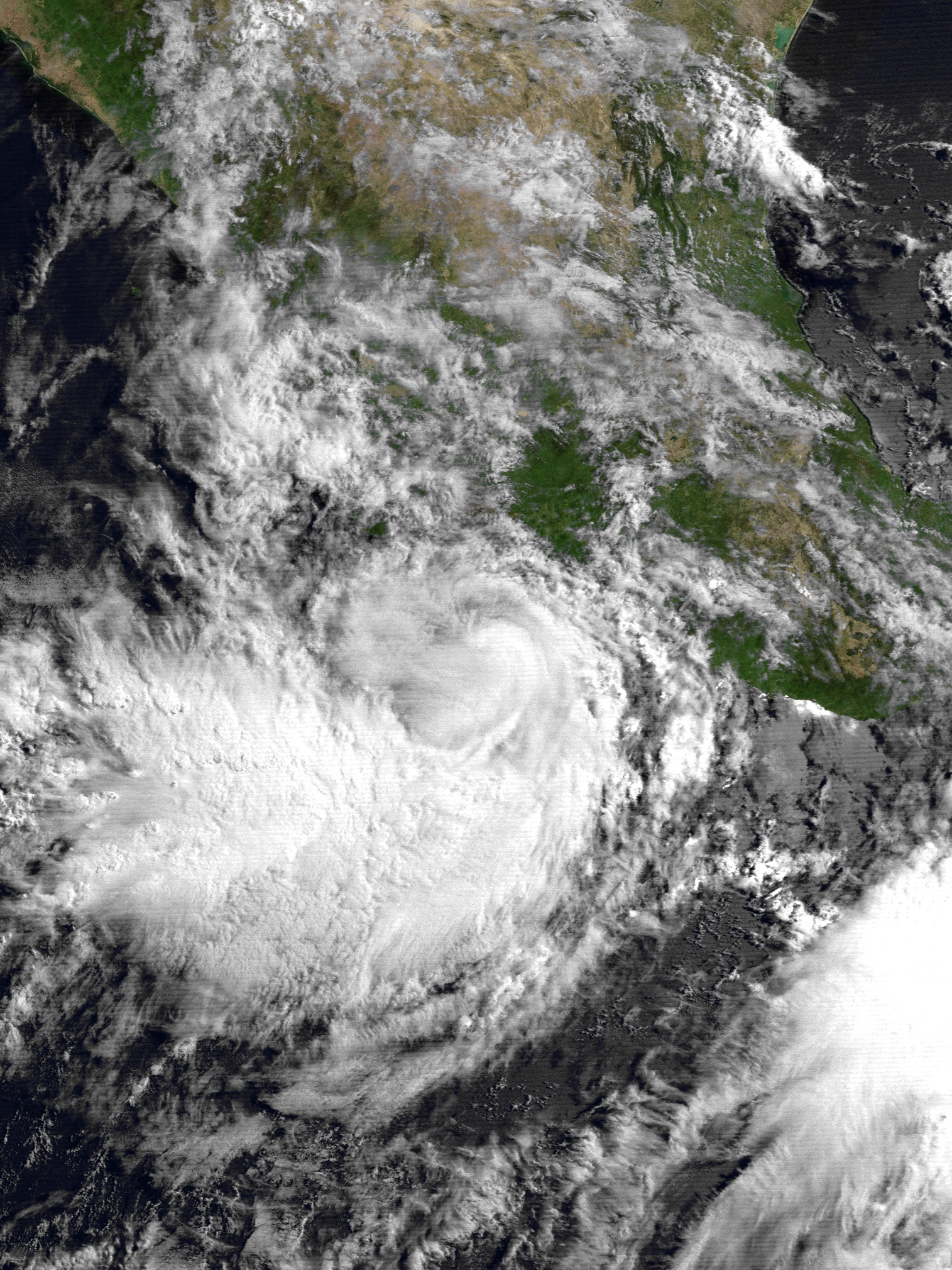
Tropical Storm Aletta near peak intensity on June 18

- 00:00 UTC (5:00 p.m. PDT, June 16) at 14.8°N 101.3°W – Tropical Depression Two-E strengthens into Tropical Storm Aletta while located about 175 mi (280 km) southwest of Acapulco.

June 18

- 06:00 UTC (11:00 p.m. PDT, June 17) at 16.4°N 101.7°W – Tropical Storm Aletta attains its peak intensity, with maximum sustained winds of 70 mph (110 km/h) and a minimum central pressure of 992 mbar (29.29 inHg), while located about 125 mi (205 km) west-southwest of Acapulco.
- 18:00 UTC (11:00 a.m. PDT) at 13.9°N 113.0°W – Tropical Depression One-E is last noted as a tropical cyclone while located about 650 mi (1,045 km) south-southwest of the southern tip of the Baja California peninsula, dissipating shortly thereafter.

June 19

- 18:00 UTC (11:00 a.m. PDT) at 17.5°N 104.2°W – Tropical Storm Aletta weakens into a tropical depression while located about 110 mi (175 km) south of Manzanillo, Colima.

June 20

- 18:00 UTC (11:00 a.m. PDT) at 11.5°N 91.9°W – Tropical Depression Three-E develops from an area of unsettled weather while located about 235 mi (380 km) southwest of San Salvador, El Salvador.

June 21

- 12:00 UTC (5:00 a.m. PDT) at 17.0°N 108.0°W – Tropical Depression Aletta is last noted as a tropical cyclone while located about 280 mi (455 km) west-southwest of Manzanillo, dissipating shortly thereafter.
- 12:00 UTC (5:00 a.m. PDT) at 14.0°N 94.5°W – Tropical Depression Three-E strengthens into Tropical Storm Bud while located about 155 mi (250 km) south-southeast of Salina Cruz, Oaxaca.

June 22

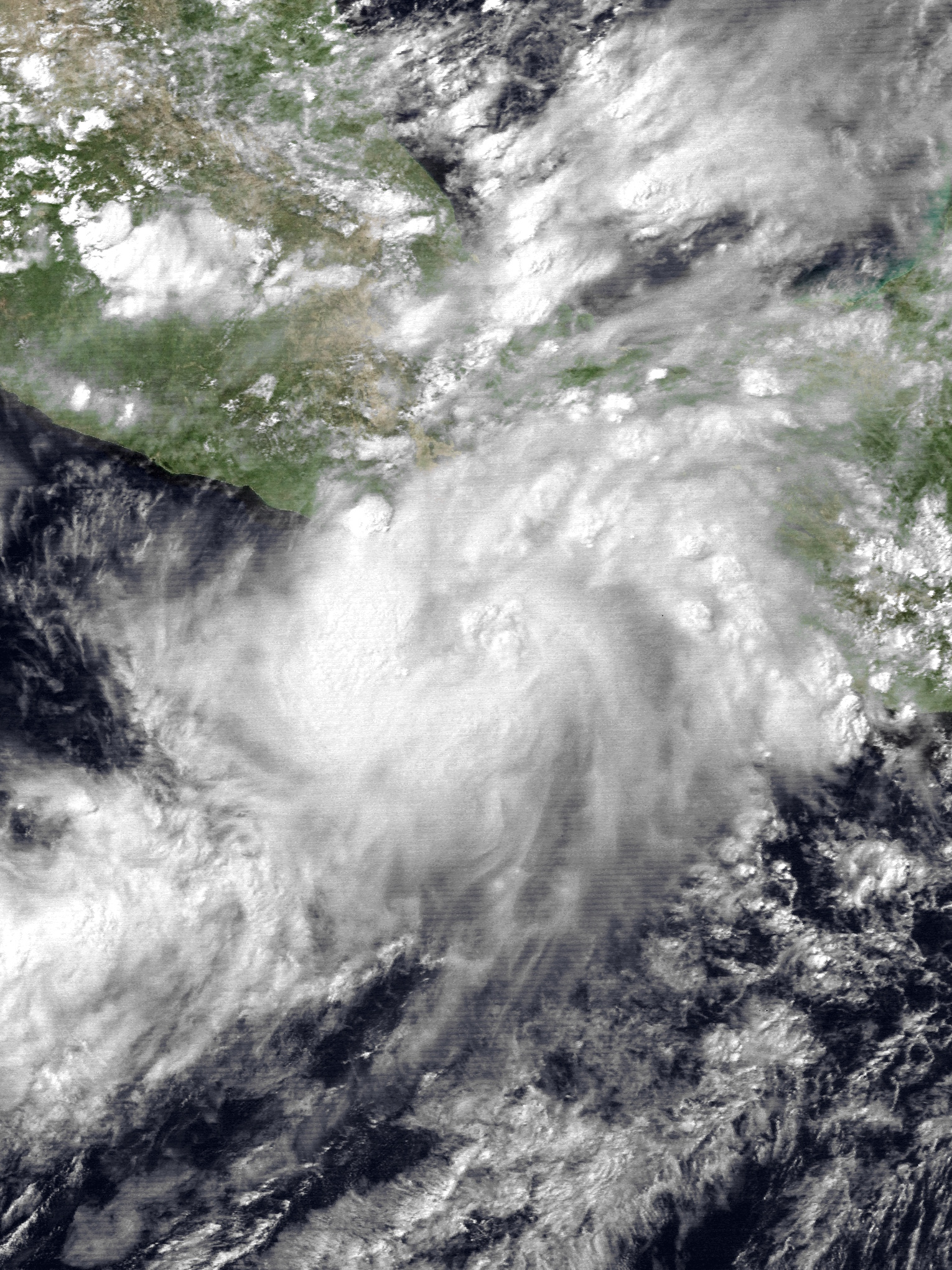
Tropical Storm Bud near peak intensity late on June 21

- 06:00 UTC (11:00 p.m. PDT, June 21) at 15.1°N 97.8°W – Tropical Storm Bud attains its peak intensity, with maximum sustained winds of 50 mph (85 km/h) and a minimum central pressure of 1000 mbar (29.53 inHg), while located about 185 mi (295 km) southeast of Acapulco.
- 18:00 UTC (11:00 a.m. PDT) at 16.0°N 100.0°W – Tropical Storm Bud weakens into a tropical depression while located about 60 mi (95 km) south of Acapulco, dissipating shortly thereafter.

=== July ===
July 2

- 00:00 UTC (5:00 p.m. PDT, July 1) at 19.0°N 108.6°W – Tropical Depression Four-E develops from an area of unsettled weather while located about 280 mi (455 km) south-southeast of the southern tip of the Baja California peninsula. It is already at its peak intensity, with maximum sustained winds of 30 mph (45 km/h) and an unknown central pressure.

July 4

- 06:00 UTC (11:00 p.m. PDT, July 3) at 22.0°N 108.9°W – Tropical Depression Four-E is last noted as a tropical cyclone while located about 90 mi (150 km) southeast of the southern tip of the Baja California peninsula, dissipating shortly thereafter.

July 8

- 21:00 UTC (2:00 p.m. PDT) at 13.3°N 104.1°W – Tropical Depression Five-E develops from a tropical wave while located about 375 mi (600 km) southwest of Acapulco. (Note: The Northeast and North Central Pacific hurricane database (HURDAT) initiates Tropical Depression Five-E—future Hurricane Carlotta—three hours earlier, at 18:00 UTC (11:00 a.m. PDT) on July 8.)

July 9

- 12:00 UTC (5:00 a.m. PDT) at 13.9°N 107.0°W – Tropical Depression Five-E strengthens into Tropical Storm Carlotta while located about 395 mi (640 km) south-southwest of Manzanillo.

July 11

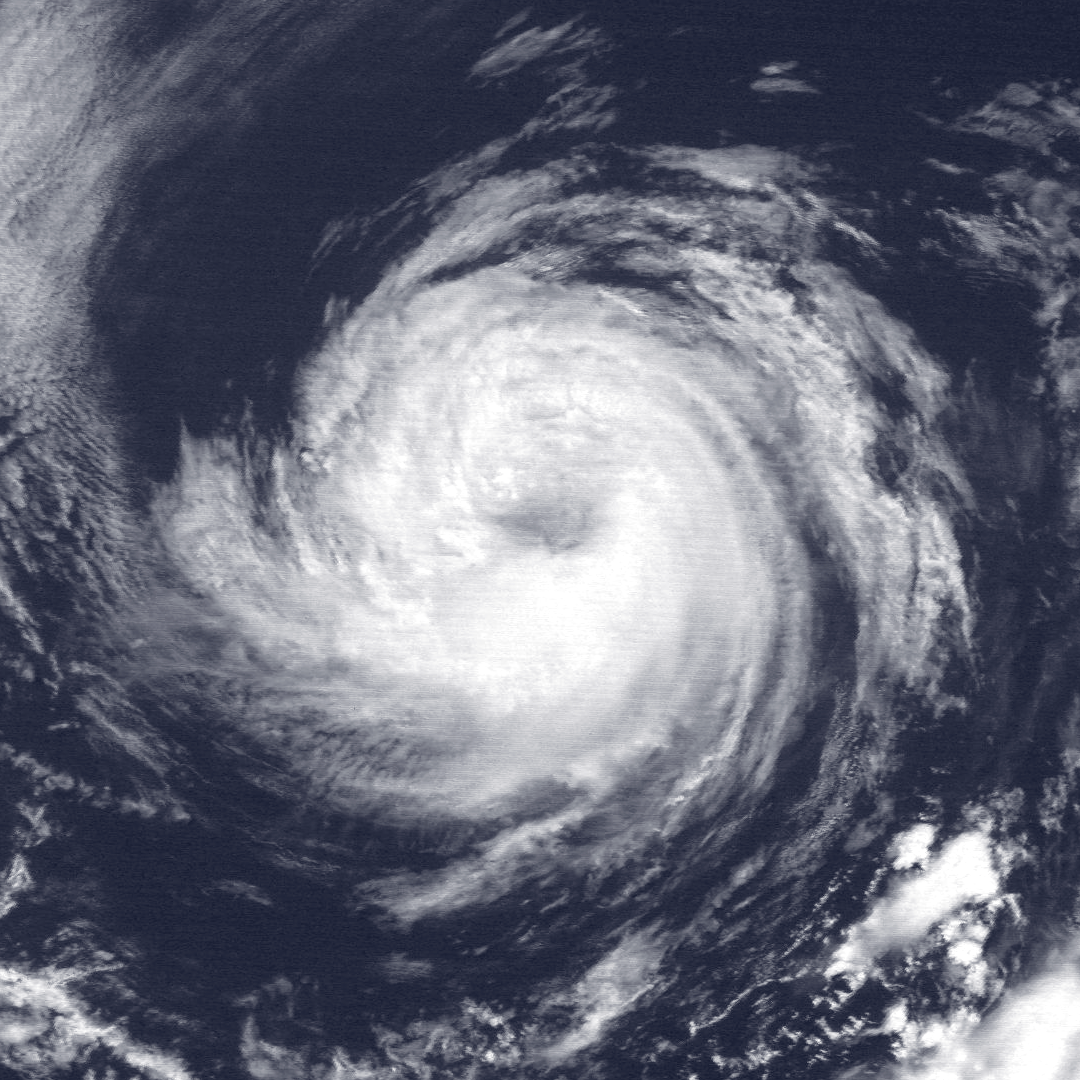
Hurricane Carlotta at peak intensity late on July 11

- 12:00 UTC (5:00 a.m. PDT) at 17.9°N 115.4°W – Tropical Storm Carlotta strengthens into a Category 1 hurricane on the Saffir–Simpson scale while located about 490 mi (790 km) southwest of the southern tip of the Baja California peninsula. (Note: HURDAT lists Carlotta as becoming a hurricane six hours earlier, at 06:00 UTC on July 11 (11:00 p.m. PDT on July 10).)
- 18:00 UTC (11:00 a.m. PDT) at 18.6°N 116.5°W – Hurricane Carlotta attains its peak intensity, with maximum sustained winds of 75 mph (120 km/h) and a minimum central pressure of 987 mbar (29.15 inHg), while located about 520 mi (835 km) southwest of the southern tip of the Baja California peninsula. (Note: HURDAT lists Carlotta as attaining peak intensity with winds of 75 mph (120 km/h) and a pressure of 994 mbar (29.35 inHg) at 06:00 UTC on July 11 (11:00 p.m. PDT on July 10).)

July 12

- 06:00 UTC (11:00 p.m. PDT, July 11) at 19.8°N 118.5°W – Hurricane Carlotta weakens into a tropical storm while located about 585 mi (945 km) west-southwest of the southern tip of the Baja California peninsula.

July 13

- 06:00 UTC (11:00 p.m. PDT, July 12) at 21.4°N 122.0°W – Tropical Storm Carlotta weakens into a tropical depression while located about 775 mi (1,250 km) west of the southern tip of the Baja California peninsula.

July 15

- 12:00 UTC (5:00 a.m. PDT) at 21.0°N 128.2°W – Tropical Depression Carlotta is last noted as a tropical cyclone while located about 1,175 mi (1,890 km) west of the southern tip of the Baja California peninsula, dissipating shortly thereafter.

July 19

- 12:00 UTC (5:00 a.m. PDT) at 14.6°N 112.5°W – Tropical Depression Six-E develops from a tropical wave while located about 595 mi (955 km) south-southwest of the southern tip of the Baja California peninsula.

July 20

- 00:00 UTC (5:00 p.m. PDT, July 19) at 15.1°N 113.4°W – Tropical Depression Six-E strengthens into Tropical Storm Daniel while located about 580 mi (935 km) south-southwest of the southern tip of the Baja California peninsula.

July 24

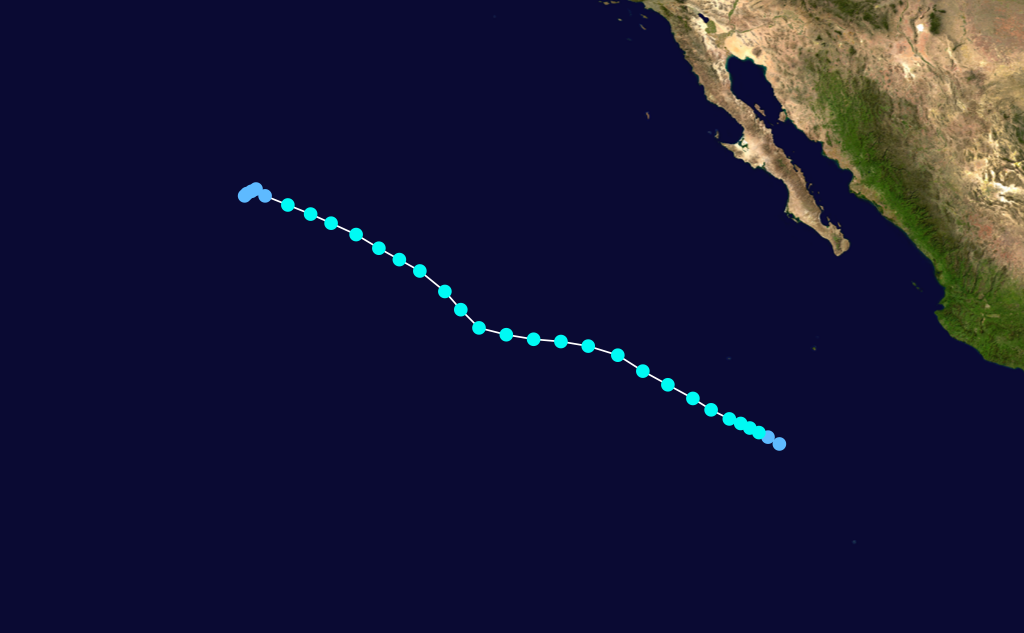
Storm track of Tropical Storm Daniel

- 00:00 UTC (5:00 p.m. PDT, July 23) at 22.2°N 128.3°W – Tropical Storm Daniel attains its peak intensity, with maximum sustained winds of 65 mph (100 km/h) and a minimum central pressure of 994 mbar (29.35 inHg), while located about 1,170 mi (1,880 km) west of the southern tip of the Baja California peninsula.

July 25

- 18:00 UTC (11:00 a.m. PDT) at 25.5°N 135.1°W – Tropical Storm Daniel weakens into a tropical depression while located about 1,595 mi (2,565 km) west of the southern tip of the Baja California peninsula.

July 26

- 18:00 UTC (11:00 a.m. PDT) at 25.5°N 136.0°W – Tropical Depression Daniel is last noted as a tropical cyclone while located about 1,645 mi (2,650 km) west of the southern tip of the Baja California peninsula, dissipating shortly thereafter.

July 27

- 18:00 UTC (11:00 a.m. PDT) at 14.0°N 109.0°W – Tropical Depression Seven-E develops from a tropical wave while located about 615 mi (990 km) south of the southern tip of the Baja California peninsula.

July 28

- 12:00 UTC (5:00 a.m. PDT) at 15.5°N 135.0°W (Note: HURDAT places Tropical Depression Ten-E—future Tropical Storm Gilma—at 15.1°N 135.0°W, or about 1,720 mi (2,770 km) west-southwest of the southern tip of the Baja California peninsula.) – Tropical Depression Ten-E develops from a tropical wave while located about 1,710 mi (2,750 km) west-southwest of the southern tip of the Baja California peninsula.
- 18:00 UTC (11:00 a.m. PDT) at 12.0°N 121.0°W – Tropical Depression Eight-E develops from an Intertropical Convergence Zone (ITCZ) disturbance while located about 1,040 mi (1,675 km) southwest of the southern tip of the Baja California peninsula.
- 18:00 UTC (11:00 a.m. PDT) at 17.5°N 129.6°W – Tropical Depression Nine-E develops from an area of unsettled weather while located about 1,325 mi (2,130 km) west-southwest of the southern tip of the Baja California peninsula. It is already at its peak intensity, with maximum sustained winds of 30 mph (45 km/h) and an unknown central pressure.

July 29

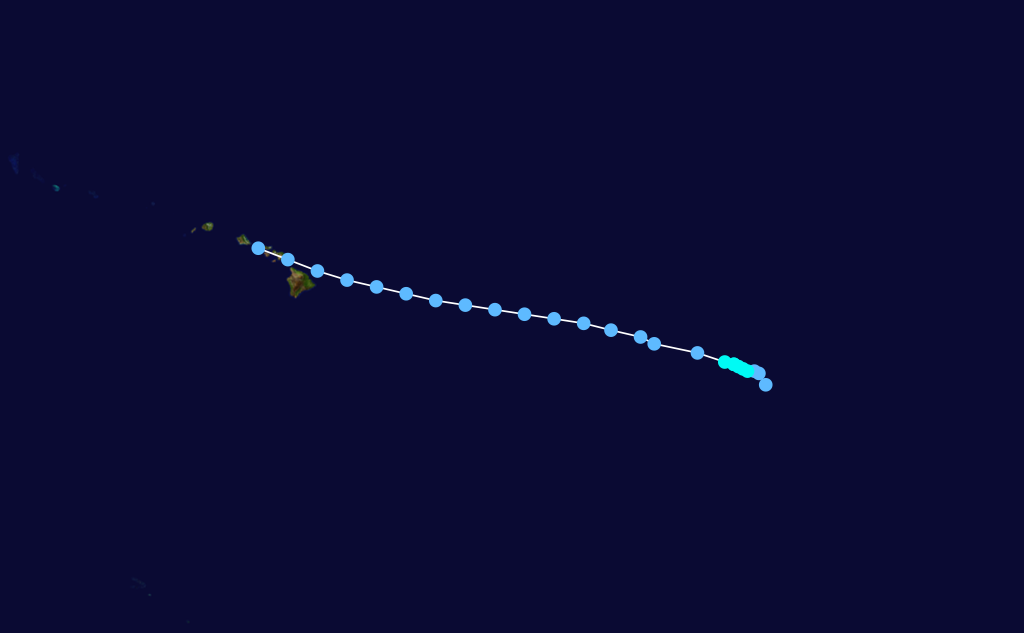
Storm track of Tropical Storm Gilma

- 06:00 UTC (11:00 p.m. PDT, July 28) at 15.7°N 135.8°W – Tropical Depression Ten-E strengthens into Tropical Storm Gilma while located about 1,755 mi (2,825 km) west-southwest of the southern tip of the Baja California peninsula.
- 12:00 UTC (5:00 a.m. PDT) at 15.1°N 113.6°W – Tropical Depression Seven-E strengthens into Tropical Storm Emilia while located about 585 mi (945 km) south-southwest of the southern tip of the Baja California peninsula.
- 18:00 UTC (11:00 a.m. PDT) at 15.9°N 136.2°W – Tropical Storm Gilma attains its peak intensity, with maximum sustained winds of 50 mph (85 km/h) and a minimum central pressure of 1000 mbar (29.53 inHg), while located about 1,775 mi (2,855 km) west-southwest of the southern tip of the Baja California peninsula.
- 18:00 UTC (11:00 a.m. PDT) at 12.0°N 125.0°W – Tropical Depression Eight-E strengthens into Tropical Storm Fabio while located about 1,245 mi (2,000 km) southwest of the southern tip of the Baja California peninsula.
- 18:00 UTC (11:00 a.m. PDT) at 20.0°N 131.5°W – Tropical Depression Nine-E is last noted as a tropical cyclone while located about 1,400 mi (2,250 km) west of the southern tip of the Baja California peninsula, dissipating shortly thereafter.

July 30

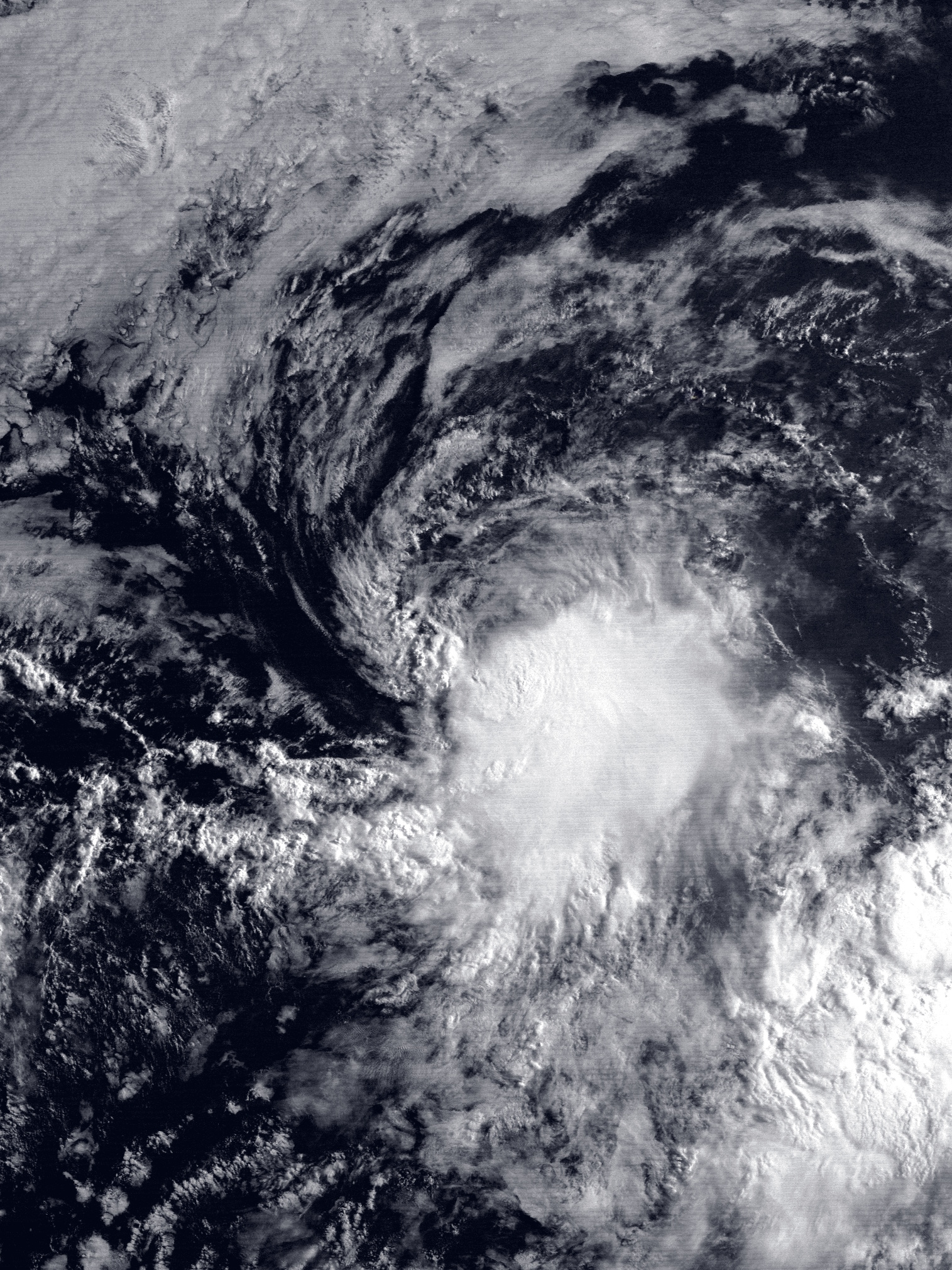
Tropical Storm Emilia at peak intensity on July 30

- 12:00 UTC (5:00 a.m. PDT) at 15.4°N 116.9°W – Tropical Storm Emilia attains its peak intensity, with maximum sustained winds of 70 mph (110 km/h) and a minimum central pressure of 992 mbar (29.29 inHg), while located about 685 mi (1,105 km) southwest of the southern tip of the Baja California peninsula.
- 18:00 UTC (11:00 a.m. PDT) at 16.5°N 138.0°W – Tropical Storm Gilma weakens into a tropical depression while located about 1,870 mi (3,010 km) west-southwest of the southern tip of the Baja California peninsula.
- 18:00 UTC (11:00 a.m. PDT) at 11.3°N 98.3°W – Tropical Depression Eleven-E develops from an area of unsettled weather while located about 395 mi (640 km) south-southeast of Acapulco.

July 31

- 06:00 UTC (8:00 p.m. HST, July 30) at 17.0°N 140.7°W (Note: HURDAT places Gilma at 17.2°N 140.5°W, or about 975 mi (1,565 km) east of Hilo, Hawaii.) – Tropical Depression Gilma crosses 140°W into the Central Pacific basin while located about 960 mi (1,545 km) east of Hilo, Hawaii.
- 12:00 UTC (5:00 a.m. PDT) at 12.2°N 131.4°W – Tropical Storm Fabio strengthens into a Category 1 hurricane while located about 1,590 mi (2,555 km) west-southwest of the southern tip of the Baja California peninsula.
- 18:00 UTC (11:00 a.m. PDT) at 12.3°N 103.7°W – Tropical Depression Eleven-E strengthens into Tropical Storm Hector while located about 405 mi (650 km) southwest of Acapulco.

=== August ===
August 1

- 00:00 UTC (5:00 p.m. PDT, July 31) at 16.3°N 121.9°W – Tropical Storm Emilia weakens into a tropical depression while located about 900 mi (1,445 km) west-southwest of the southern tip of the Baja California peninsula.

August 2

- 00:00 UTC (5:00 p.m. PDT, August 1) at 14.6°N 109.9°W – Tropical Storm Hector strengthens into a Category 1 hurricane while located about 570 mi (915 km) south of the southern tip of the Baja California peninsula.
- 06:00 UTC (11:00 p.m. PDT, August 1) at 13.0°N 138.5°W – Hurricane Fabio strengthens to Category 2 intensity while located about 1,990 mi (3,205 km) west-southwest of the southern tip of the Baja California peninsula.
- 12:00 UTC (5:00 a.m. PDT) at 15.0°N 112.1°W – Hurricane Hector rapidly strengthens to Category 3 intensity while located about 565 mi (910 km) south-southwest of the southern tip of the Baja California peninsula, making it the first major hurricane of the season.
- 18:00 UTC (11:00 a.m. PDT) at 13.4°N 126.0°W – Tropical Depression Emilia is last noted as a tropical cyclone while located about 1,235 mi (1,990 km) west-southwest of the southern tip of the Baja California peninsula, dissipating shortly thereafter.
- 18:00 UTC (8:00 a.m. HST) at 13.5°N 140.6°W (Note: HURDAT places Fabio at 13.4°N 140.7°W, or about 1,065 mi (1,715 km) east-southeast of South Point, Hawaii.) – Hurricane Fabio crosses 140°W into the Central Pacific basin while located about 1,065 mi (1,715 km) east-southeast of South Point, Hawaii.
- 18:00 UTC (11:00 a.m. PDT) at 15.6°N 113.1°W – Hurricane Hector strengthens to Category 4 intensity while located about 540 mi (870 km) south-southwest of the southern tip of the Baja California peninsula.

August 3

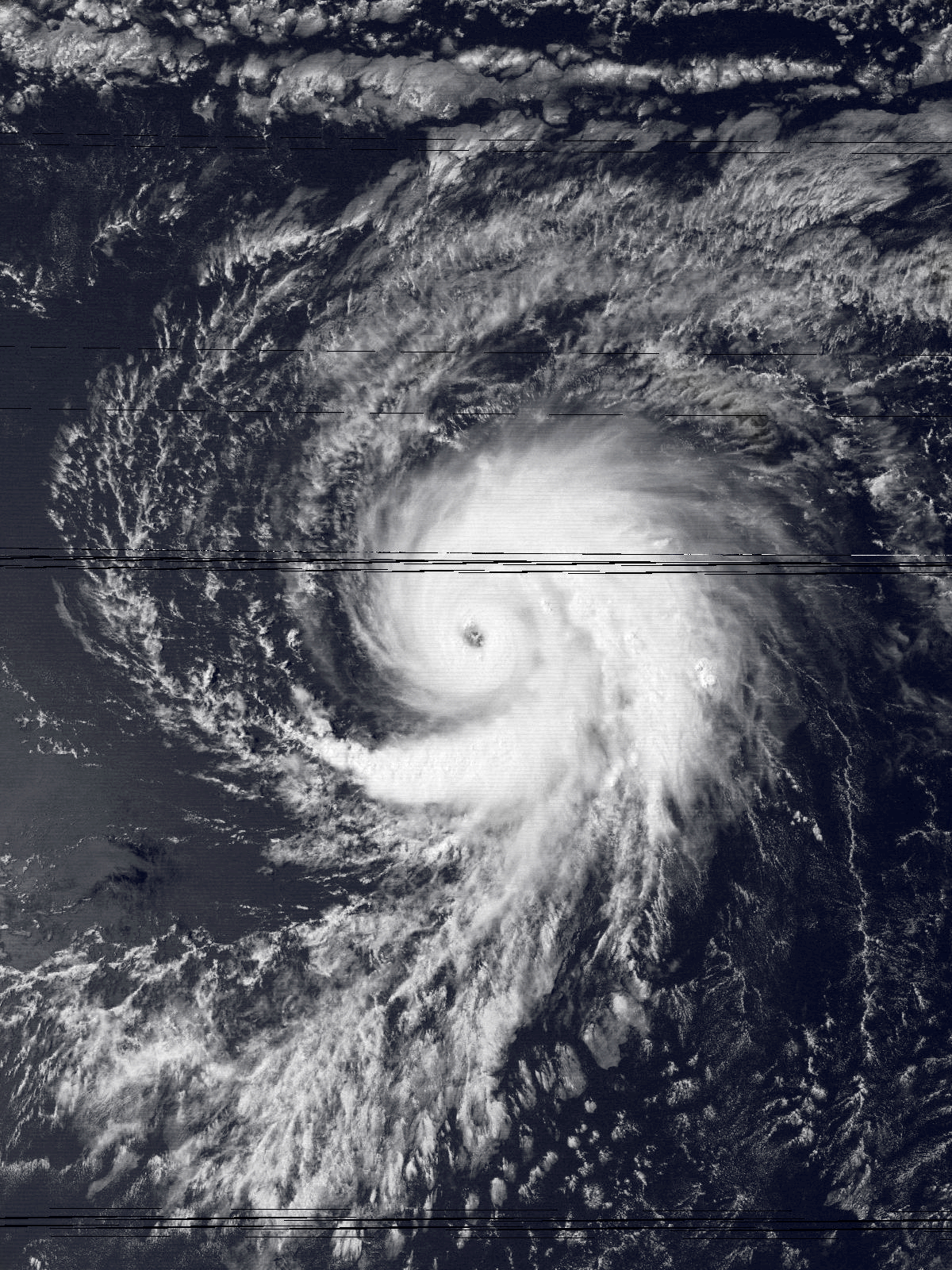
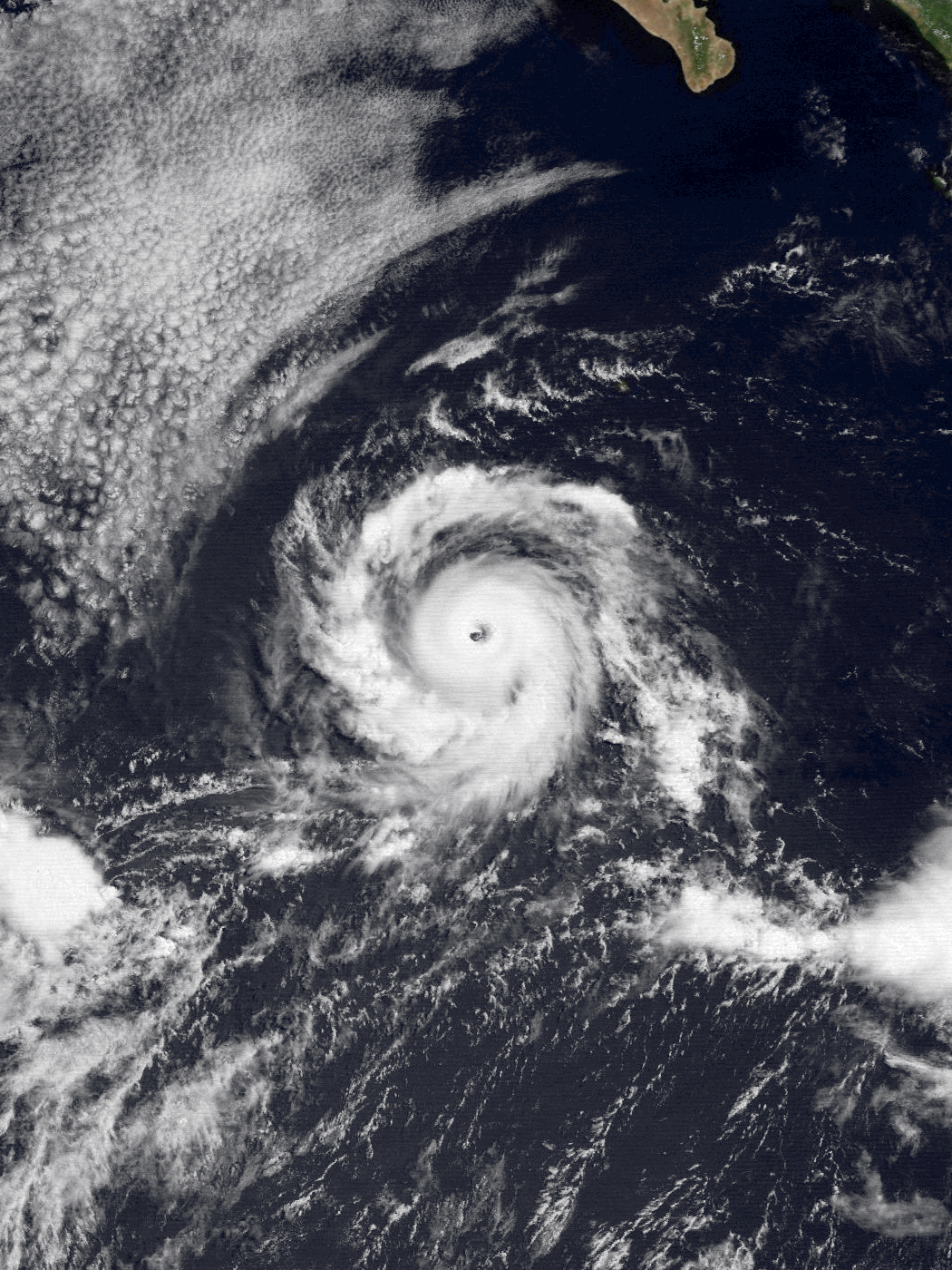
Hurricanes Fabio (left) and Hector (right), the two strongest storms of the season, reached their peak intensities on the same day: August 3. Both hurricanes are pictured as they were strengthening late the previous day.
- Exact time and location unknown – After brushing Maui and Molokaʻi, Tropical Depression Gilma makes landfall on Oahu with maximum sustained winds of 25 mph (35 km/h) and an unknown central pressure.
- 00:00 UTC (2:00 p.m. HST, August 2) at 13.8°N 141.6°W (Note: HURDAT places Fabio at 13.7°N 141.7°W, or about 995 mi (1,605 km) east-southeast of South Point.) – Hurricane Fabio strengthens to Category 3 intensity while located about 995 mi (1,605 km) east-southeast of South Point, making it the second major hurricane of the season.
- 06:00 UTC (11:00 p.m. PDT, August 2) at 16.4°N 115.2°W – Hurricane Hector attains its peak intensity, with maximum sustained winds of 145 mph (230 km/h) and a minimum central pressure of 935 mbar (27.61 inHg), while located about 565 mi (910 km) southwest of the southern tip of the Baja California peninsula, making it the strongest storm of the season.
- 12:00 UTC (2:00 a.m. HST) at 21.3°N 157.7°W (Note: HURDAT places Gilma at 21.1°N 157.3°W, or near Kauaʻi.) – Tropical Depression Gilma is last noted as a tropical cyclone while located near Kauaʻi, dissipating shortly thereafter.
- 12:00 UTC (2:00 a.m. HST) at 14.6°N 144.1°W (Note: HURDAT places Fabio at 14.7°N 143.8°W, or about 835 mi (1,345 km) east-southeast of South Point.) – Hurricane Fabio strengthens to Category 4 intensity while located about 825 mi (1,325 km) east-southeast of South Point. (Note: HURDAT upgrades Fabio to Category 4 intensity six hours earlier, at 06:00 UTC on August 3 (8:00 p.m. HST on August 2).) It simultaneously attains its peak intensity, with maximum sustained winds of 140 mph (220 km/h) and a minimum central pressure of 943 mbar (27.85 inHg).
- 18:00 UTC (8:00 a.m. HST) at 15.1°N 145.2°W (Note: HURDAT places Fabio at 15.2°N 145.0°W, or about 750 mi (1,205 km) east-southeast of South Point.) – Hurricane Fabio weakens to Category 3 intensity while located about 740 mi (1,195 km) east-southeast of South Point.

August 4

- 00:00 UTC (2:00 p.m. HST, August 3) at 15.8°N 146.3°W (Note: HURDAT places Fabio at 15.7°N 146.2°W, or about 660 mi (1,065 km) east-southeast of South Point.) – Hurricane Fabio weakens to Category 2 intensity while located about 655 mi (1,055 km) east-southeast of South Point. (Note: HURDAT maintains Fabio at Category 3 intensity at 00:00 UTC on August 4 (2:00 p.m. HST on August 3), downgrading it to Category 2 intensity six hours later.)
- 06:00 UTC (11:00 p.m. PDT, August 3) at 18.2°N 119.0°W – Hurricane Hector weakens to Category 3 intensity while located about 670 mi (1,075 km) west-southwest of the southern tip of the Baja California peninsula.
- 18:00 UTC (8:00 a.m. HST) at 16.1°N 149.2°W (Note: HURDAT places Fabio at 16.2°N 149.5°W, or about 450 mi (725 km) east-southeast of South Point.) – Hurricane Fabio weakens to Category 1 intensity while located about 465 mi (750 km) east-southeast of South Point. (Note: HURDAT downgrades Fabio to Category 1 intensity six hours earlier, at 12:00 UTC (2:00 a.m. HST) on August 4.)
- 18:00 UTC (11:00 a.m. PDT) at 18.9°N 120.9°W – Hurricane Hector weakens to Category 2 intensity while located about 760 mi (1,225 km) west-southwest of the southern tip of the Baja California peninsula.

August 5

- 00:00 UTC (2:00 p.m. HST, August 4) at 15.9°N 150.6°W – Hurricane Fabio weakens into a tropical storm while located about 390 mi (630 km) east-southeast of South Point.
- 00:00 UTC (5:00 p.m. PDT, August 4) at 13.2°N 96.4°W – Tropical Depression Twelve-E develops from a tropical wave while located about 220 mi (350 km) south-southwest of Salina Cruz.
- 06:00 UTC (11:00 p.m. PDT, August 4) at 19.0°N 123.0°W – Hurricane Hector weakens to Category 1 intensity while located about 880 mi (1,420 km) west-southwest of the southern tip of the Baja California peninsula.

August 6

- 00:00 UTC (2:00 p.m. HST, August 5) at 15.5°N 154.2°W – Tropical Storm Fabio weakens into a tropical depression while located about 255 mi (410 km) south-southeast of South Point.
- 00:00 UTC (5:00 p.m. PDT, August 5) at 14.5°N 102.6°W – Tropical Depression Twelve-E strengthens into Tropical Storm Iva while located about 240 mi (390 km) southwest of Acapulco.

August 7

- 00:00 UTC (5:00 p.m. PDT, August 6) at 16.2°N 107.4°W – Tropical Storm Iva strengthens into a Category 1 hurricane while located about 295 mi (475 km) southeast of Socorro Island.
- 18:00 UTC (11:00 a.m. PDT) at 17.6°N 110.0°W – Hurricane Iva strengthens to Category 2 intensity while located about 105 mi (165 km) southeast of Socorro Island.

August 8

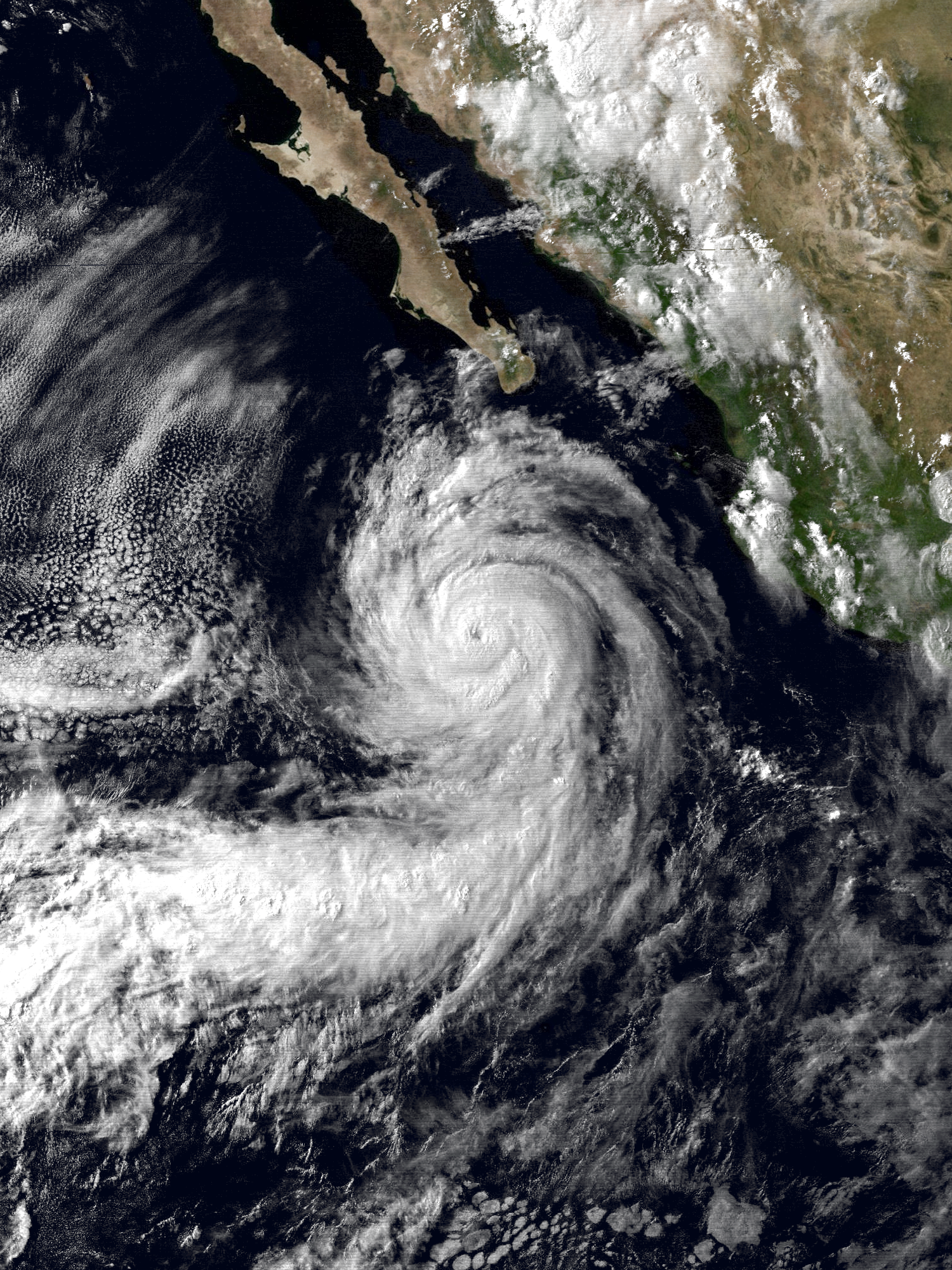
Hurricane Iva near peak intensity early on August 8

- 06:00 UTC (11:00 p.m. PDT, August 7) at 18.0°N 136.1°W – Hurricane Hector weakens into a tropical storm while located about 1,720 mi (2,770 km) west of the southern tip of the Baja California peninsula.
- 12:00 UTC (5:00 a.m. PDT) at 19.2°N 112.2°W – Hurricane Iva attains its peak intensity, with maximum sustained winds of 105 mph (165 km/h) and a minimum central pressure of 968 mbar (28.59 inHg), while located about 85 mi (140 km) west-northwest of Socorro Island.

August 9

- 06:00 UTC (8:00 p.m. HST, August 8) at 18.7°N 141.2°W (Note: HURDAT places Hector at 18.7°N 141.4°W, or about 900 mi (1,445 km) east of Hilo.) – Tropical Storm Hector weakens into a tropical depression as it crosses 140°W into the Central Pacific basin while located about 910 mi (1,465 km) east of Hilo. (Note: HURDAT lists Hector as entering the Central Pacific basin at 00:00 UTC on August 9 (2:00 p.m. HST on August 8). At that time, HURDAT places Hector at 18.6°N 140.0°W, or about 985 mi (1,585 km) east of Hilo. Additionally, HURDAT maintains Hector as a tropical storm through 06:00 UTC on August 9 (8:00 p.m. HST on August 8), downgrading it to a tropical depression six hours later.)
- 12:00 UTC (2:00 a.m. HST) at 17.8°N 163.6°W (Note: HURDAT places Fabio at 17.6°N 163.4°W, or about 395 mi (640 km) southwest of Kauaʻi.) – Tropical Depression Fabio is last noted as a tropical cyclone while located about 395 mi (640 km) southwest of Kauaʻi, dissipating shortly thereafter. (Note: HURDAT maintains Fabio as a tropical cyclone for six more hours, terminating it after 18:00 UTC (8:00 a.m. HST) on August 9.)
- 12:00 UTC (5:00 a.m. PDT) at 20.7°N 115.8°W – Hurricane Iva weakens to Category 1 intensity while located about 340 mi (545 km) west-northwest of Socorro Island.
- 18:00 UTC (8:00 a.m. HST) at 19.3°N 145.0°W (Note: HURDAT places Hector at 19.1°N 144.0°W, or about 725 mi (1,165 km) east of Hilo.) – Tropical Depression Hector is last noted as a tropical cyclone while located about 655 mi (1,055 km) east of Hilo, dissipating shortly thereafter.

August 10

- 00:00 UTC (5:00 p.m. PDT, August 9) at 20.5°N 117.3°W – Hurricane Iva weakens into a tropical storm while located about 425 mi (685 km) west-northwest of Socorro Island.

August 11

- 18:00 UTC (11:00 a.m. PDT) at 19.5°N 119.5°W – Tropical Storm Iva weakens into a tropical depression while located about 560 mi (900 km) west of Socorro Island.

August 13

- 18:00 UTC (11:00 a.m. PDT) at 17.5°N 123.3°W – Tropical Depression Iva is last noted as a tropical cyclone while located about 810 mi (1,305 km) west of Socorro Island, dissipating shortly thereafter.

August 14

- 00:00 UTC (5:00 p.m. PDT, August 13) at 18.4°N 109.6°W – Tropical Depression Thirteen-E develops from an area of unsettled weather while located about 310 mi (500 km) south of the southern tip of the Baja California peninsula.
- 12:00 UTC (5:00 a.m. PDT) at 18.7°N 108.8°W – Tropical Depression Thirteen-E attains its peak intensity, with maximum sustained winds of 35 mph (55 km/h) and an unknown central pressure, while located about 300 mi (480 km) south-southeast of the southern tip of the Baja California peninsula.

August 15

- 00:00 UTC (5:00 p.m. PDT, August 14) at 19.1°N 108.7°W – After weakening slightly, Tropical Depression Thirteen-E reattains its peak intensity while located about 270 mi (435 km) south-southeast of the southern tip of the Baja California peninsula.

August 16

- 18:00 UTC (11:00 a.m. PDT) at 17.0°N 109.5°W – Tropical Depression Thirteen-E is last noted as a tropical cyclone while located about 410 mi (660 km) south of the southern tip of the Baja California peninsula, dissipating shortly thereafter.
- 18:00 UTC (11:00 a.m. PDT) at 17.5°N 105.8°W – Tropical Depression Fourteen-E develops from a tropical wave while located about 145 mi (230 km) southwest of Manzanillo.

August 17

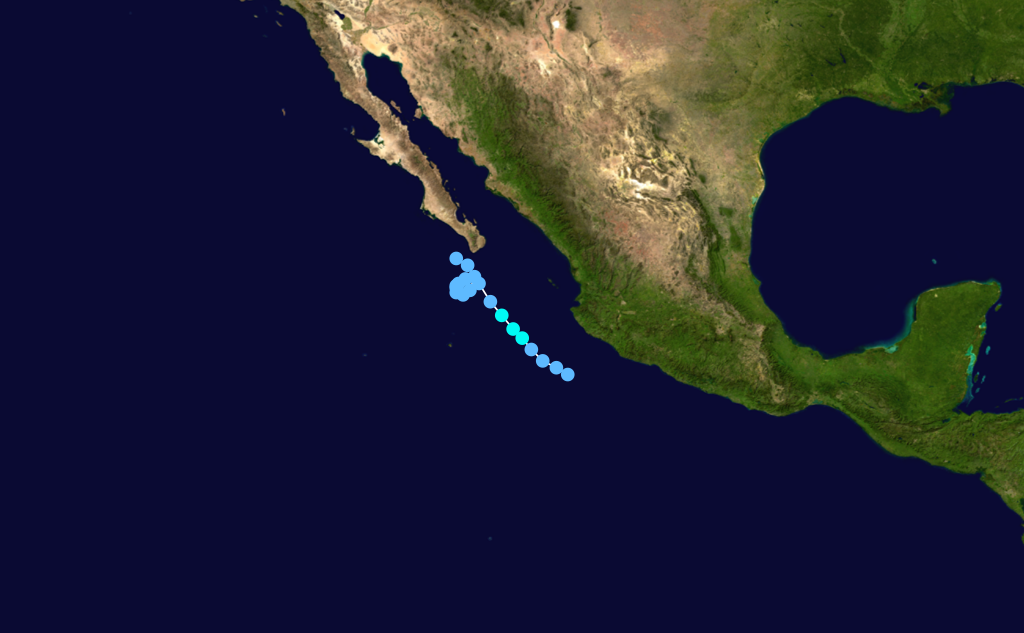
Storm track of Tropical Storm John

- 18:00 UTC (11:00 a.m. PDT) at 19.1°N 107.8°W – Tropical Depression Fourteen-E strengthens into Tropical Storm John while located about 230 mi (370 km) west of Manzanillo.

August 18

- 06:00 UTC (11:00 p.m. PDT, August 17) at 20.1°N 108.7°W – Tropical Storm John attains its peak intensity, with maximum sustained winds of 40 mph (65 km/h) and a minimum central pressure of 1004 mbar (29.65 inHg), while located about 205 mi (335 km) south-southeast of the southern tip of the Baja California peninsula.
- 12:00 UTC (5:00 a.m. PDT) at 20.7°N 109.2°W – Tropical Storm John weakens into a tropical depression while located about 155 mi (250 km) south-southeast of the southern tip of the Baja California peninsula.

August 21

- 06:00 UTC (11:00 p.m. PDT, August 20) at 22.6°N 110.7°W – Tropical Depression John is last noted as a tropical cyclone while located about 50 mi (85 km) west-southwest of the southern tip of the Baja California peninsula, dissipating shortly thereafter.

August 27

- 00:00 UTC (5:00 p.m. PDT, August 26) at 14.8°N 112.1°W – Tropical Depression Fifteen-E develops from an area of unsettled weather while located about 575 mi (925 km) south-southwest of the southern tip of the Baja California peninsula. It is already at its peak intensity, with maximum sustained winds of 35 mph (55 km/h) and an unknown central pressure.

August 28

- 18:00 UTC (8:00 a.m. HST) at 12.2°N 145.0°W – Tropical Depression One-C develops from an ITCZ disturbance while located about 845 mi (1,360 km) southeast of South Point.

August 29

- 00:00 UTC (5:00 p.m. PDT, August 28) at 17.4°N 112.2°W – Tropical Depression Fifteen-E is last noted as a tropical cyclone while located about 405 mi (650 km) south-southwest of the southern tip of the Baja California peninsula, dissipating shortly thereafter.
- 00:00 UTC (5:00 p.m. PDT, August 28) at 13.0°N 98.0°W – Tropical Depression Sixteen-E develops from the remnants of Atlantic Tropical Depression Six while located about 295 mi (475 km) south-southeast of Acapulco.
- 12:00 UTC (5:00 a.m. PDT) at 14.4°N 100.0°W – Tropical Depression Sixteen-E strengthens into Tropical Storm Kristy while located about 175 mi (280 km) south of Acapulco.
- 18:00 UTC (8:00 a.m. HST) at 12.5°N 149.0°W – Tropical Depression One-C strengthens into Tropical Storm Uleki while located about 625 mi (1,010 km) southeast of South Point.

August 31

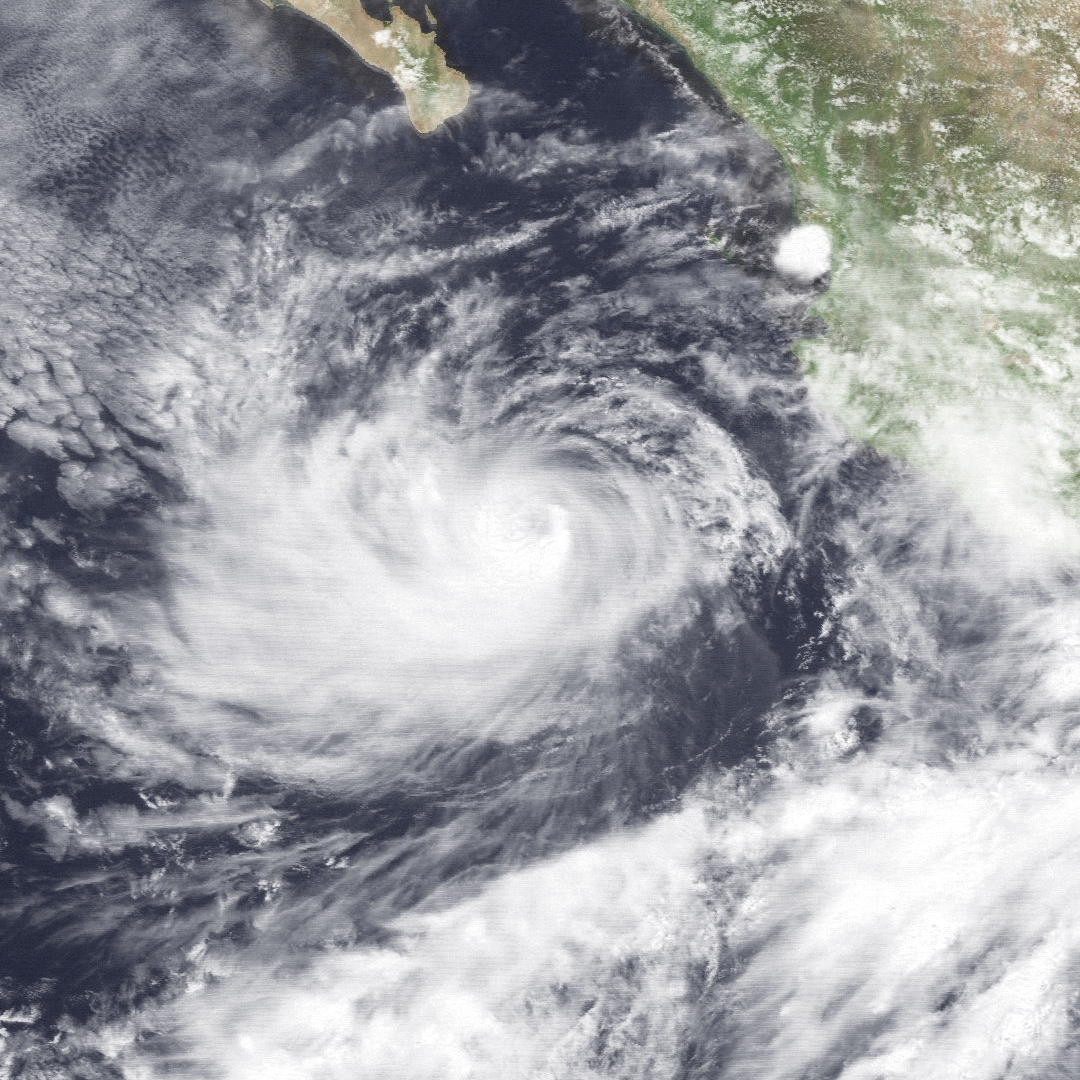
Hurricane Kristy shortly before peak intensity late on August 31

- 00:00 UTC (2:00 p.m. HST, August 30) at 13.6°N 154.4°W – Tropical Storm Uleki strengthens into a Category 1 hurricane while located about 375 mi (600 km) south-southeast of South Point.
- 00:00 UTC (5:00 p.m. PDT, August 30) at 17.4°N 106.0°W – Tropical Storm Kristy strengthens into a Category 1 hurricane while located about 340 mi (545 km) east-southeast of Socorro Island.
- 18:00 UTC (8:00 a.m. HST) at 14.2°N 156.7°W – Hurricane Uleki rapidly strengthens to Category 3 intensity while located about 335 mi (535 km) south of South Point, making it the third and final major hurricane of the season.

=== September ===
September 1

- 00:00 UTC (5:00 p.m. PDT, September 1) at 18.4°N 109.5°W – Hurricane Kristy attains its peak intensity, with maximum sustained winds of 90 mph (150 km/h) and a minimum central pressure of 976 mbar (28.82 inHg), while located about 100 mi (155 km) east-southeast of Socorro Island.
- 20:26 UTC (10:26 a.m. HST), exact location unknown – Hurricane Uleki attains peak maximum sustained winds of 125 mph (205 km/h) while located south of Hawaii.

September 2

- 06:00 UTC (11:00 p.m. PDT, September 1) at 17.7°N 111.6°W – Hurricane Kristy weakens into a tropical storm while located about 85 mi (140 km) south-southwest of Socorro Island.
- 15:28 UTC (5:28 a.m. HST), exact location unknown – Hurricane Uleki attains a minimum central pressure of 957 mbar (28.26 inHg) while located south of Hawaii.

September 3

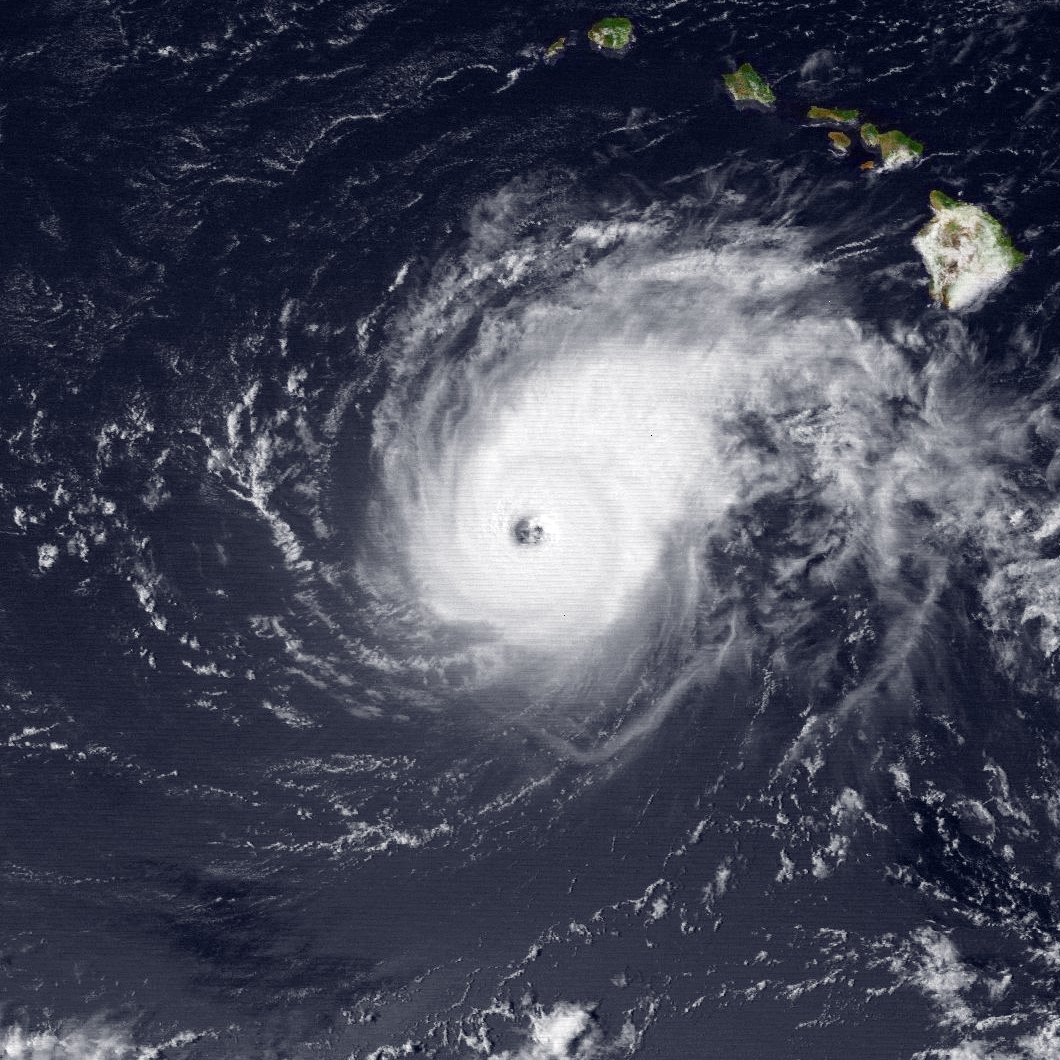
Hurricane Uleki early on September 3

- 12:00 UTC (5:00 a.m. PDT) at 18.5°N 114.0°W – Tropical Storm Kristy weakens into a tropical depression while located about 200 mi (325 km) west of Socorro Island.
- 18:00 UTC (8:00 a.m. HST) at 16.9°N 160.1°W – Hurricane Uleki weakens to Category 2 intensity while located about 345 mi (555 km) south of Niʻihau.

September 4

- 06:00 UTC (8:00 p.m. HST, September 3) at 17.4°N 160.4°W – Hurricane Uleki weakens to Category 1 intensity while located about 310 mi (500 km) south of Niʻihau.

September 5

- 06:00 UTC (11:00 p.m. PDT, September 4) at 19.6°N 105.1°W – Atlantic Tropical Depression Debby crosses over Mexico and emerges off the Pacific coast while located about 65 mi (100 km) northwest of Manzanillo, whereupon it is redesignated as Tropical Depression Seventeen-E. It is already at what constitutes its Eastern Pacific peak intensity, with maximum sustained winds of 35 mph (55 km/h) and a minimum central pressure of 1002 mbar (29.59 inHg).

September 6

- 12:00 UTC (5:00 a.m. PDT) at 18.9°N 113.0°W – Tropical Depression Kristy is last noted as a tropical cyclone while located about 130 mi (215 km) west of Socorro Island, dissipating shortly thereafter.

September 7

- 12:00 UTC (2:00 a.m. HST) at 24.1°N 175.3°W – Hurricane Uleki restrengthens to Category 2 intensity while located about 310 mi (500 km) south-southeast of Midway Atoll.

September 8

- 12:00 UTC (2:00 a.m. HST) at 25.6°N 178.7°E – Hurricane Uleki crosses the International Date Line into the Western Pacific basin while located about 305 mi (490 km) southwest of Midway Atoll, thereby becoming part of the annual typhoon season.
- 18:00 UTC (11:00 a.m. PDT) at 24.0°N 109.0°W – Tropical Depression Seventeen-E is last noted as a tropical cyclone while located about 80 mi (130 km) east of La Paz, Baja California Sur, dissipating shortly thereafter.

September 12

- 18:00 UTC (11:00 a.m. PDT) at 16.3°N 108.2°W – Tropical Depression Eighteen-E develops from an area of unsettled weather while located about 465 mi (750 km) south-southeast of the southern tip of the Baja California peninsula. It is already at its peak intensity, with maximum sustained winds of 35 mph (55 km/h) and an unknown central pressure.

September 15

- 18:00 UTC (11:00 a.m. PDT) at 17.0°N 111.0°W – Tropical Depression Eighteen-E is last noted as a tropical cyclone while located 410 mi (660 km) south of the southern tip of the Baja California peninsula, dissipating shortly thereafter.

September 21

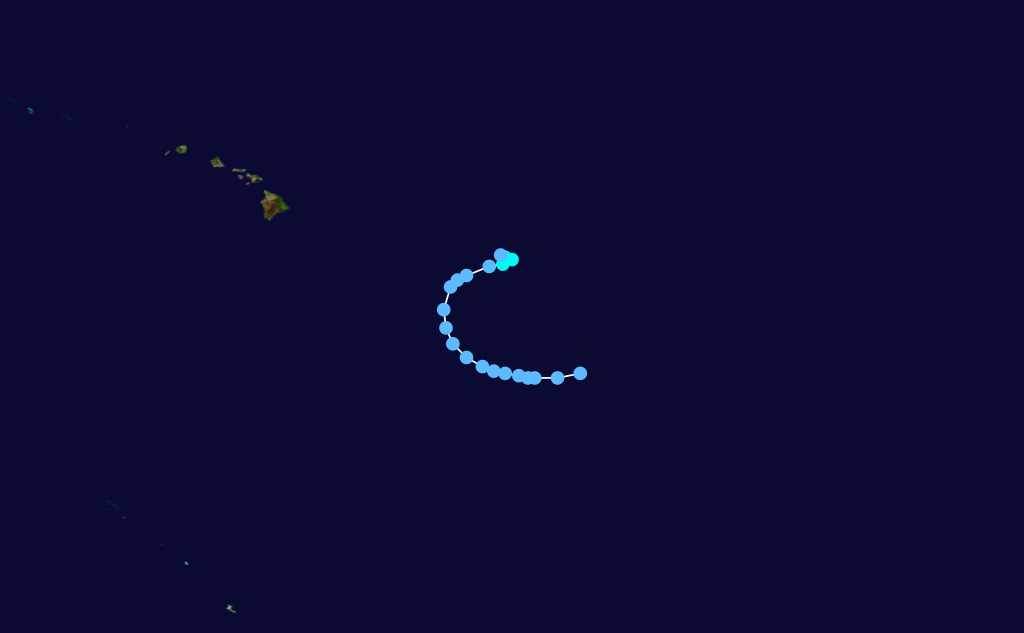
Storm track of Tropical Storm Wila

- 00:00 UTC (2:00 p.m. HST, September 20) at 12.2°N 142.0°W – Tropical Depression Two-C develops from an area of unsettled weather while located about 1,015 mi (1,630 km) east-southeast of Hilo.
- 06:00 UTC (11:00 p.m. PDT, September 20) at 12.7°N 97.5°W – Tropical Depression Nineteen-E develops from a tropical wave while located about 330 mi (530 km) south-southeast of Acapulco.
- 18:00 UTC (11:00 a.m. PDT) at 13.6°N 99.7°W – Tropical Depression Nineteen-E strengthens into Tropical Storm Lane while located about 225 mi (360 km) south of Acapulco.

September 23

- 06:00 UTC (11:00 p.m. PDT, September 22) at 16.6°N 107.2°W – Tropical Storm Lane strengthens into a Category 1 hurricane while located about 280 mi (455 km) south-southwest of Cabo Corrientes.
- 18:00 UTC (11:00 a.m. PDT) at 17.1°N 109.2°W – Hurricane Lane strengthens to Category 2 intensity while located about 320 mi (520 km) southwest of Cabo Corrientes.

September 24

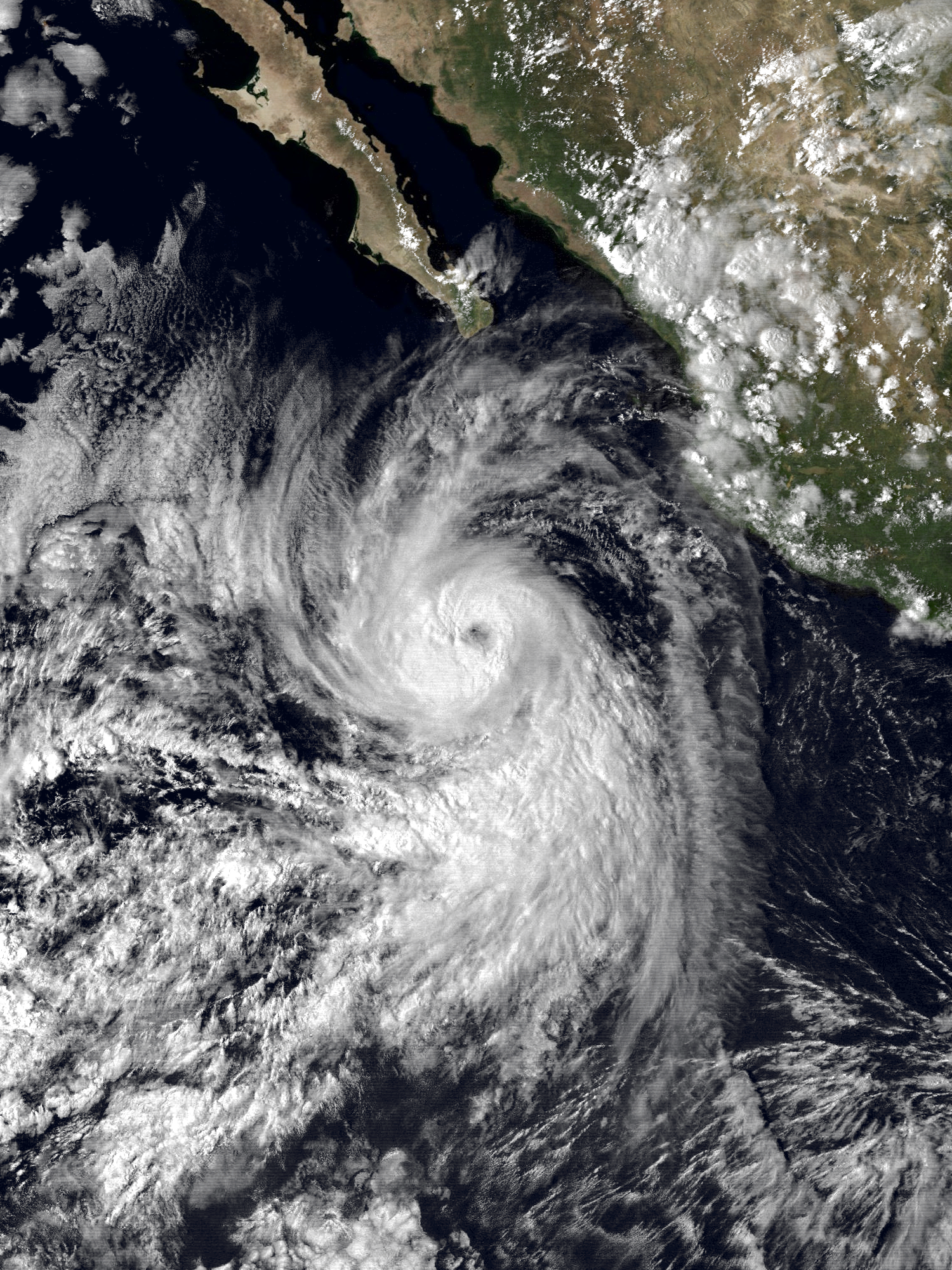
Hurricane Lane shortly before peak intensity late on September 23

- 00:00 UTC (5:00 p.m. PDT, September 23) at 17.2°N 110.2°W – Hurricane Lane attains its peak intensity, with maximum sustained winds of 105 mph (165 km/h) and a minimum central pressure of 970 mbar (28.64 inHg), while located about 370 mi (595 km) southwest of Cabo Corrientes.
- 18:00 UTC (11:00 a.m. PDT) at 17.7°N 113.1°W – Hurricane Lane weakens to Category 1 intensity while located about 410 mi (660 km) south-southwest of the southern tip of the Baja California peninsula.

September 25

- 00:00 UTC (2:00 p.m. HST, September 24) at 17.0°N 145.4°W – Tropical Depression Two-C strengthens into Tropical Storm Wila while located about 660 mi (1,065 km) east-southeast of Hilo. It simultaneously attains its peak intensity, with maximum sustained winds of 40 mph (65 km/h) and an unknown central pressure.
- 18:00 UTC (8:00 a.m. HST) at 17.4°N 145.5°W – Tropical Storm Wila weakens into a tropical depression while located about 645 mi (1,040 km) east-southeast of Hilo, dissipating shortly thereafter.

September 27

- 06:00 UTC (11:00 p.m. PDT, September 26) at 18.5°N 124.0°W – Hurricane Lane weakens into a tropical storm while located about 955 mi (1,540 km) west-southwest of the southern tip of the Baja California peninsula.

September 28

- 18:00 UTC (11:00 a.m. PDT) at 20.9°N 131.0°W – Tropical Storm Lane weakens into a tropical depression while located about 1,350 mi (2,175 km) west of the southern tip of the Baja California peninsula.

September 30

- 12:00 UTC (5:00 a.m. PDT) at 23.5°N 139.1°W – Tropical Depression Lane is last noted as a tropical cyclone while located about 1,845 mi (2,975 km) west of the southern tip of the Baja California peninsula, dissipating shortly thereafter.

=== October ===
October 11

- 06:00 UTC (11:00 p.m. PDT, October 10) at 17.5°N 109.3°W – Tropical Depression Twenty-E develops from the remnants of Atlantic Tropical Storm Isaac while located about 375 mi (600 km) south of the southern tip of the Baja California peninsula. It is already at its peak intensity, with maximum sustained winds of 35 mph (55 km/h) and an unknown central pressure.

October 12

- 18:00 UTC (11:00 a.m. PDT) at 16.1°N 115.3°W – Tropical Depression Twenty-E is last noted as a tropical cyclone while located about 580 mi (935 km) southwest of the southern tip of the Baja California peninsula, dissipating shortly thereafter.

October 23

- 06:00 UTC (11:00 p.m. PDT, October 22) at 12.2°N 86.8°W – Atlantic Tropical Storm Joan crosses over Nicaragua into the Eastern Pacific basin while located just south of León, whereupon it is redesignated as Tropical Storm Miriam.

October 24

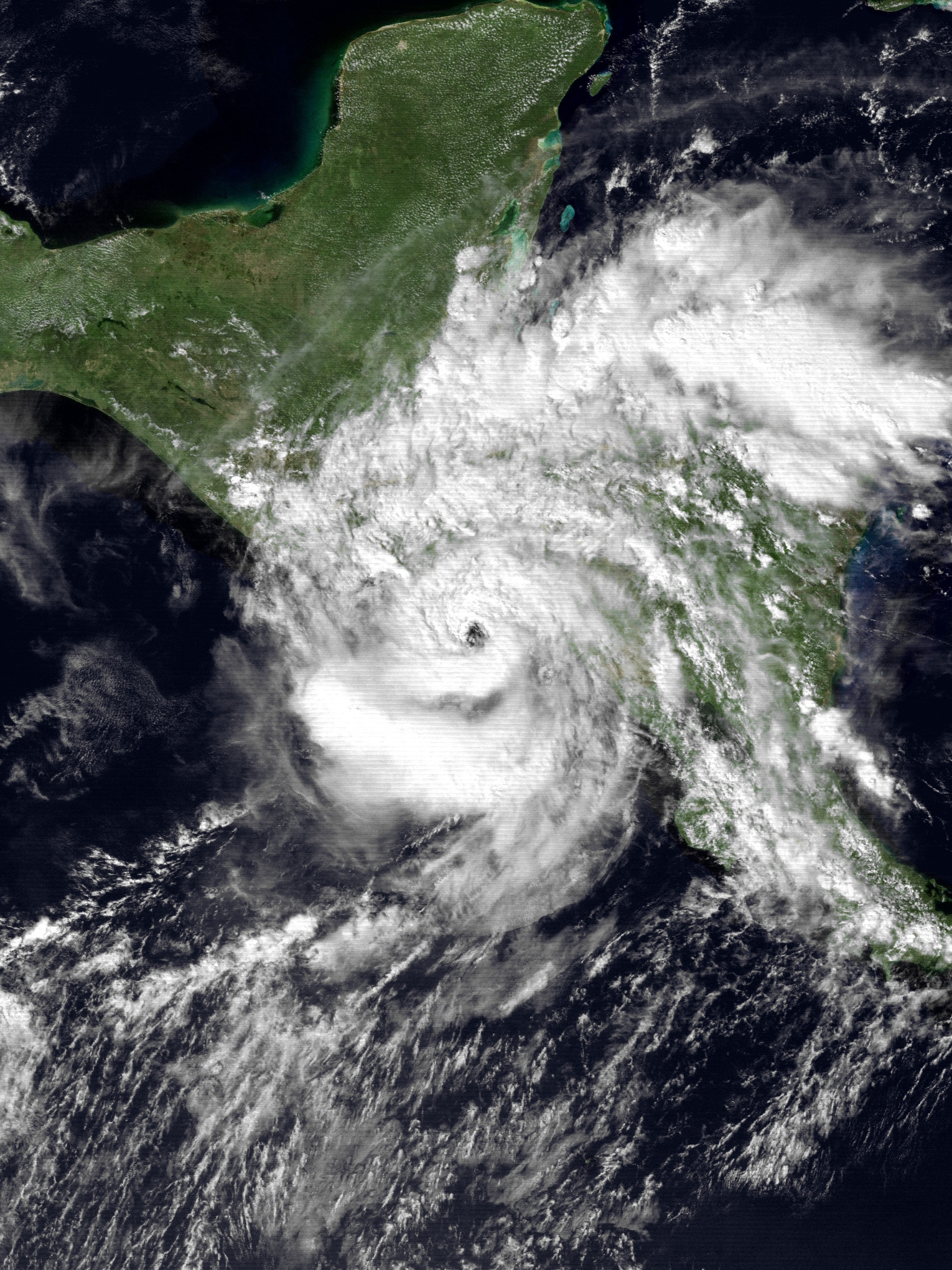
Tropical Storm Miriam shortly before peak intensity late on October 23

- 00:00 UTC (5:00 p.m. PDT, October 23) at 13.1°N 89.5°W – Tropical Storm Miriam attains its peak intensity, with maximum sustained winds of 70 mph (110 km/h) and a minimum central pressure of 986 mbar (29.12 inHg), while located about 185 mi (295 km) west-northwest of León.

October 26

- 00:00 UTC (5:00 p.m. PDT, October 25) at 13.4°N 94.6°W – Tropical Storm Miriam weakens into a tropical depression while located about 425 mi (685 km) southeast of Acapulco.

October 28

- 18:00 UTC (11:00 a.m. PDT) at 12.0°N 101.6°W – Tropical Depression Miriam dissipates for the first time while located about 355 mi (575 km) south-southwest of Acapulco.

October 30

- 12:00 UTC (4:00 a.m. PST) (Note: Daylight saving time ended on October 30, 1988. At 2:00 a.m. PDT, clocks were moved back to 1:00 a.m. PST.) at 12.9°N 109.0°W – Tropical Depression Miriam regenerates while located about 565 mi (910 km) south-southwest of Cabo Corrientes.

=== November ===
November 2

- 12:00 UTC (4:00 a.m. PST) at 18.4°N 118.3°W – Tropical Depression Miriam is last noted as a tropical cyclone while located about 620 mi (1,000 km) west-southwest of the southern tip of the Baja California peninsula, dissipating for the second and final time shortly thereafter.

November 30

- The 1988 Pacific hurricane season officially ends.

== See also ==
- Timeline of the 1988 Atlantic hurricane season
