= Timeline of the 1988 Atlantic hurricane season =

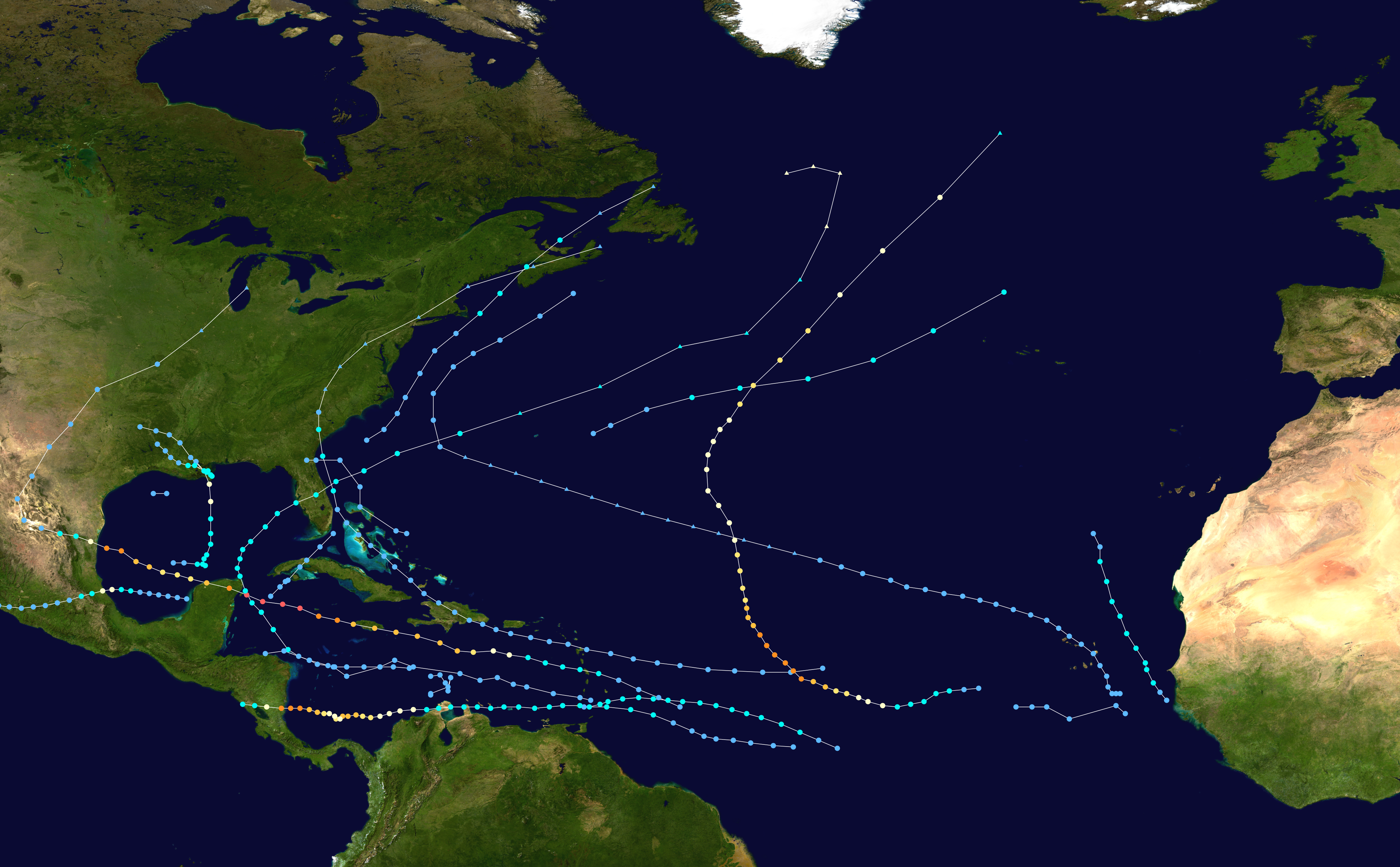
- Season summary map

Season boundaries
- First system formed: May 31, 1988
- Last system dissipated: November 24, 1988

Strongest system
- Name: Gilbert
- Maximum winds: 185 mph (295 km/h) (1-minute sustained)
- Lowest pressure: 888 mbar (hPa; 26.22 inHg)

Longest lasting system
- Name: Joan
- Duration: 12.5 (Note: Denotes number of days Hurricane Joan existed in the Atlantic basin, before crossing over into the Eastern Pacific.) days
Storm articles
- Tropical Depression One (1988)
- Tropical Storm Beryl (1988)
- Tropical Storm Chris (1988)
- Hurricane Debby (1988)
- Hurricane Florence (1988)
- Hurricane Gilbert
- Hurricane Joan–Miriam
- Tropical Storm Keith (1988)

The 1988 Atlantic hurricane season was a cycle of the annual tropical cyclone season in the Atlantic Ocean in the Northern Hemisphere. There was average activity during the season, (Note: An average Atlantic hurricane season, as defined by the National Oceanic and Atmospheric Administration, has 12 tropical storms, six hurricanes and two major hurricanes.) which officially began on June 1, 1988 and ended on November 30, 1988. These dates, adopted by convention, historically describe the period in each year when most tropical systems form.

Altogether, 12 named storms formed during the season; 5 of them attained hurricane status, of which 3 became major hurricanes. (Note: Hurricanes reaching Category 3 and higher on the Saffir–Simpson scale are considered major hurricanes.) At Category 5 on the Saffir–Simpson scale, Hurricane Gilbert was the most intense tropical cyclone of the season, with sustained winds of 185 mph (295 km/h) and an atmospheric pressure of 888 mbar (26.22 inHg). It made landfall in Jamaica, the Yucatán Peninsula and then in Tamaulipas. This season, two systems, Debby and Joan, crossed into the Pacific Ocean. There, Debby was redesignated as Tropical Depression Seventeen-E, and Joan was renamed Tropical Storm Miriam.

This timeline documents tropical cyclone formations, strengthening, weakening, landfalls, extratropical transitions, and dissipations during the season. It includes information that was not released throughout the season, meaning that data from post-storm reviews by the National Hurricane Center, such as a storm that was not initially warned upon, has been included.

The time stamp for each event is first stated using Coordinated Universal Time (UTC), the 24-hour clock where 00:00 = midnight UTC. The NHC uses both UTC and the time zone where the center of the tropical cyclone is currently located. The time zones utilized (east to west) prior to 2020 were: Atlantic, Eastern, and Central. In this timeline, the respective area time is included in parentheses. Additionally, figures for maximum sustained winds and position estimates are rounded to the nearest 5 units (miles, or kilometers), following National Hurricane Center practice. Direct wind observations are rounded to the nearest whole number. Atmospheric pressures are listed to the nearest millibar and nearest hundredth of an inch of mercury.

== Timeline ==
=== May ===
T.D. One on May 30

May 30

- 18:00 UTC (2:00 p.m. EDT) – Tropical Depression One forms about 150 mi (240 km) south of Isla de la Juventud, Cuba.

=== June ===
June 1 The 1988 Atlantic hurricane season officially begins.

- 18:00 UTC (2:00 p.m. EDT) – Tropical Depression One makes landfall along the south coast of Mayabeque Province in Cuba.

June 2

- 00:00 UTC (8:00 p.m. EDT June 1) – Tropical Depression One dissipates over the Cay Sal Bank in the Bahamas.

=== July ===
- No storms in the month of July.

=== August ===
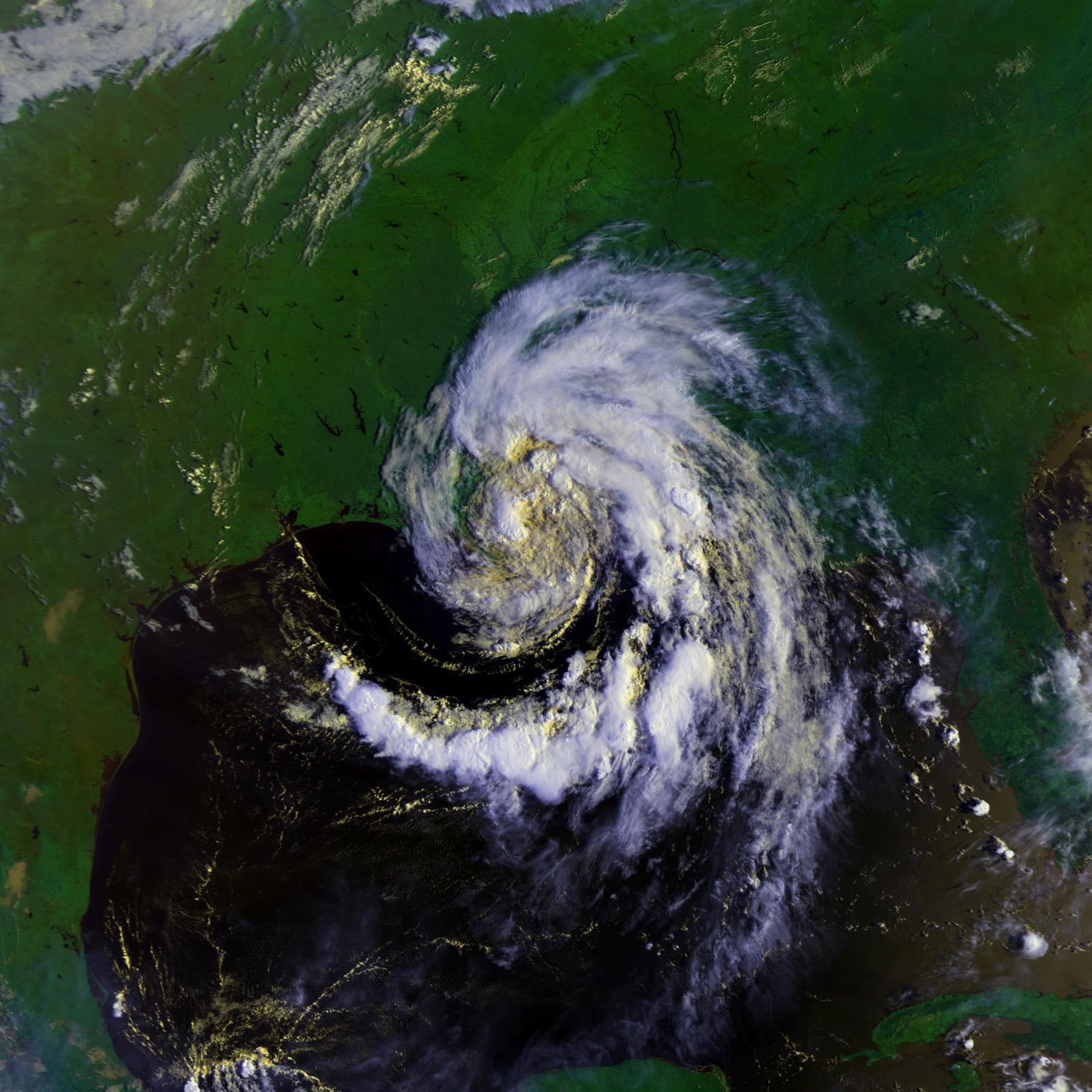
Tropical Storm Beryl on August 9

August 5

- Tropical Depression Two forms offshore South Carolina.

August 7

- 1200 UTC (8 a.m. EDT) – Tropical Depression Two strengthens into Tropical Storm Alberto.
- 0000 UTC (8 p.m. EDT) – Tropical Storm Alberto makes landfall in Nova Scotia.

August 8

- 0600 UTC (2 a.m. EDT) – Tropical Depression Three forms.
- 1200 UTC (8 a.m. EDT) – Tropical Depression Three strengthens into Tropical Storm Beryl.
- 1200 UTC (8 a.m. EDT) – Tropical storm Alberto becomes extratropical.

August 9

- 0000 UTC (8 p.m. EDT August 8) – Tropical Storm Beryl makes landfall in Southeastern Louisiana.

August 10

- 0000 UTC (8 p.m. EDT August 9) – Tropical Storm Beryl weakens into a tropical depression.
- 1800 UTC (2 p.m. EDT) – Tropical Depression Beryl dissipates.

August 12

- Unknown time: Tropical Depression Four forms near the Bahamas.

August 13

- Unknown time: Tropical Depression Four makes landfall near the Florida/Georgia.

August 16

- Unknown time: Tropical Depression Four dissipates near Mississippi.

August 20

- Unknown time: Tropical Depression Five forms.
- Unknown time: Tropical Depression Six forms.

August 21

- 1200 UTC (8 a.m. EDT) – Tropical Depression Seven forms.

August 23

- Unknown time: Tropical Depression Six dissipates as it headed towards Central America.

August 25

- 1200 UTC (8 a.m. EDT) – Tropical Depression Seven makes landfall near Santo Domingo, Dominican Republic with winds of 35 mph.

August 26

- Unknown time: Tropical Depression Five degenerates into a tropical wave.

August 27

- Around 0900 UTC (5 a.m. EDT) Tropical Depression Seven makes landfall in Andros Island with winds of 35 mph.

August 28

- 0600 UTC (2 a.m. EDT) – Tropical Depression Seven strengthens into Tropical Storm Chris.
- Unknown time: Tropical Storm Chris makes landfall near Savannah, Georgia with winds near 50 mph.

August 29

- 0000 UTC (8 p.m. EDT August 28) – Tropical Storm Chris weakens into a tropical depression near Columbia, South Carolina.

August 30

- Unknown time: Tropical Depression Chris makes landfall in Nova Scotia with winds of 35 mph.
- Unknown time: The tropical wave from Tropical Depression Five regenerates about 180 mi (290 km) offshore North Carolina.
- 1800 UTC (2 p.m. EDT) – Tropical Depression Chris dissipates after emerging from Nova Scotia.

August 31

- Unknown time – Tropical Depression Five dissipates again.
- 1800 UTC – Tropical Depression Eight formed in the Bay of Campeche.

=== September ===
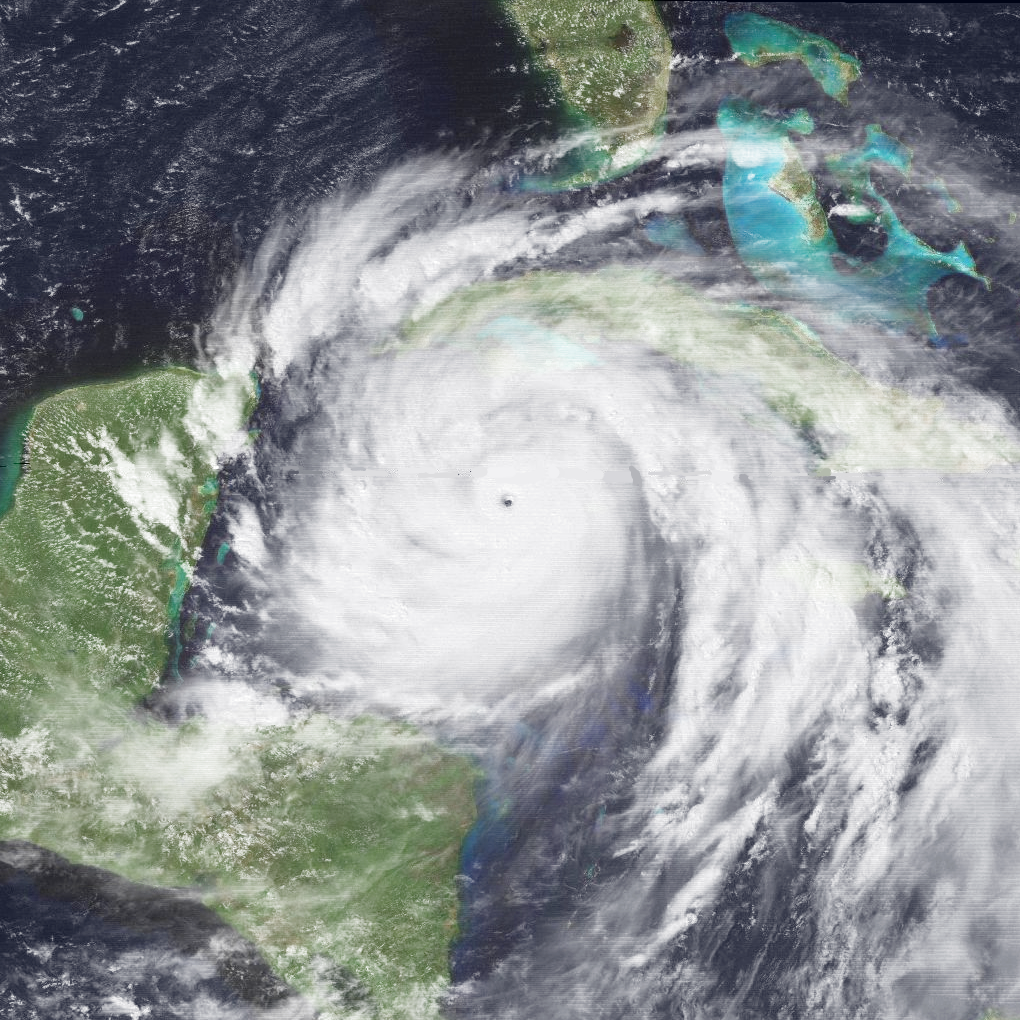
Hurricane Gilbert near peak intensity

September 2

- 0600 UTC – Tropical Depression Eight is upgraded to Tropical Storm Debby.
- 1800 UTC – Tropical Storm Debby is reclassified to Hurricane Debby.

September 3

- 0000 UTC – Tropical Depression Nine formed in the central Atlantic.
- 0000 UTC – Hurricane Debby makes landfall in Tuxpan, Mexico.
- 0600 UTC – Hurricane Debby weakens back to a tropical storm.
- 1800 UTC – Tropical Storm Debby weakens to a tropical depression.
- 1800 UTC – Tropical Depression Nine is upgraded to Tropical Storm Ernesto.
- Unknown time – Tropical Depression Ten formed in the northern Gulf of Mexico.

September 4

- Unknown time – Tropical Depression Ten makes landfall in Morgan City, Louisiana.
- Unknown time – Tropical Depression Ten dissipates over the southern United States.

September 5

- 0600 UTC – Tropical Storm Ernesto is absorbed by a larger extratropical storm.
- 0600 UTC – Tropical Depression Debby emerges into the Pacific Ocean and is reclassified as Tropical Depression Seventeen-E.

September 7

- 0000 UTC – Tropical Depression Thirteen formed in the extreme eastern Atlantic.
- 0600 UTC – Tropical Depression Eleven formed in the central Gulf of Mexico.
- 1200 UTC – Tropical Depression Thirteen became a tropical storm but went unnamed.
- 1800 UTC – Tropical Depression Eleven is upgraded to Tropical Storm Florence.

September 8

- 1800 UTC – Tropical Depression Twelve formed to the east of the Lesser Antilles.

September 9

- 0000 UTC – The "Unnamed Tropical Storm" attained peak intensity, sustain winds were at 60 mph (95 km/h) and the minimum central pressure was at 994.
- 1800 UTC – The "Unnamed Tropical Storm" weakened to a tropical depression.
- 1800 UTC – Tropical Depression Twelve is upgraded to Tropical Storm Gilbert.
- 1800 UTC – Tropical Storm Florence is upgraded to a hurricane.

September 10

- 0000 UTC – The Unnamed Tropical Storm" dissipated.
- 0000 UTC – Hurricane Florence makes landfall on the Mississippi River Delta with winds 80 mph (130 km/h).
- 0600 UTC – Hurricane Florence weakened to a tropical storm.
- 1200 UTC – Tropical Storm Florence weakened to a tropical depression.

September 11

- 0000 UTC – Tropical Storm Gilbert became strengthened into a hurricane.
- 1200 UTC – Hurricane Gilbert became a category 2 hurricane.
- 1200 UTC – Tropical Depression Florence dissipated over northeastern Texas.
- 1800 UTC – Hurricane Gilbert became a category 3 hurricane.

September 12

- 1700 UTC – Hurricane Gilbert made landfall in Jamaica with sustained winds at 125 mph (200 km/h).

September 13

- 1200 UTC – Hurricane Gilbert became a category 4 hurricane.
- 1800 UTC – Hurricane Gilbert became a category 5 hurricane.

September 14

- 0000 UTC – Hurricane Gilbert attained its peak intensity as a category 5 with sustained winds at 185 mph (300 km/h) and a minimum pressure of 888.
- 1500 UTC – Hurricane Gilbert makes landfall in the Yucatán Peninsula, winds were at 165 mph (265 km/h).
- 1800 UTC – Hurricane Gilbert weakened to a category 4 hurricane.

September 15

- 0000 UTC – Hurricane Gilbert weakened to a category 3 hurricane.
- 0600 UTC – Hurricane Gilbert weakened to a category 2 hurricane.

September 16

- 0000 UTC – Hurricane Gilbert strengthened into a category 3 hurricane.
- 2200 UTC – Hurricane Gilbert made landfall in La Pesca, Tamaulipas with winds at 130 mph (210 km/h).

September 17

- 0000 UTC – Hurricane Gilbert rapidly weakened into a category 1 hurricane.
- 0600 UTC – Hurricane Gilbert weakened to a tropical storm.
- 1800 UTC – Tropical Storm Gilbert weakened to a tropical depression.

September 19

- 1200 UTC – Tropical Depression Gilbert dissipated over Texas.
- 1800 UTC – Tropical Depression Fourteen formed.

September 20

- 0600 UTC – Tropical Depression Fourteen is upgraded to Tropical Storm Helene.

September 21

- 1200 UTC – Tropical Storm Helene strengthened into Hurricane Helene.

September 22

- 0600 UTC – Hurricane Helene becomes a category 2 hurricane.
- 1800 UTC – Hurricane Helene strengthened into a category 3 hurricane.

September 23

- 1200 UTC – Hurricane Helene becomes a category 4 hurricane.
- 1800 UTC – Hurricane Helene attained peak intensity, maximum sustained winds were at 145 mph (235 km/h) and the minimum pressure was at 938 mbar.

September 24

- 1200 UTC – Hurricane Helene weakened back to a category 3 hurricane.

September 25

- 1200 UTC – Hurricane Helene weakened back to a category 2 hurricane.

September 26

- 1200 UTC – Hurricane Helene weakened back to a category 1 hurricane.

September 28

- 1800 UTC – Hurricane Helene re-strengthened into a category 2 hurricane.
- 1800 UTC – Tropical Depression Sixteen formed in the southern portion of the North Atlantic.

September 29

- 1800 UTC – Hurricane Helene weakened back to a category 1 hurricane.

September 30

- 1200 UTC – Hurricane Helene became extratropical.
- 1800 UTC – Tropical Depression Sixteen is upgraded to Tropical Storm Isaac.

=== October ===
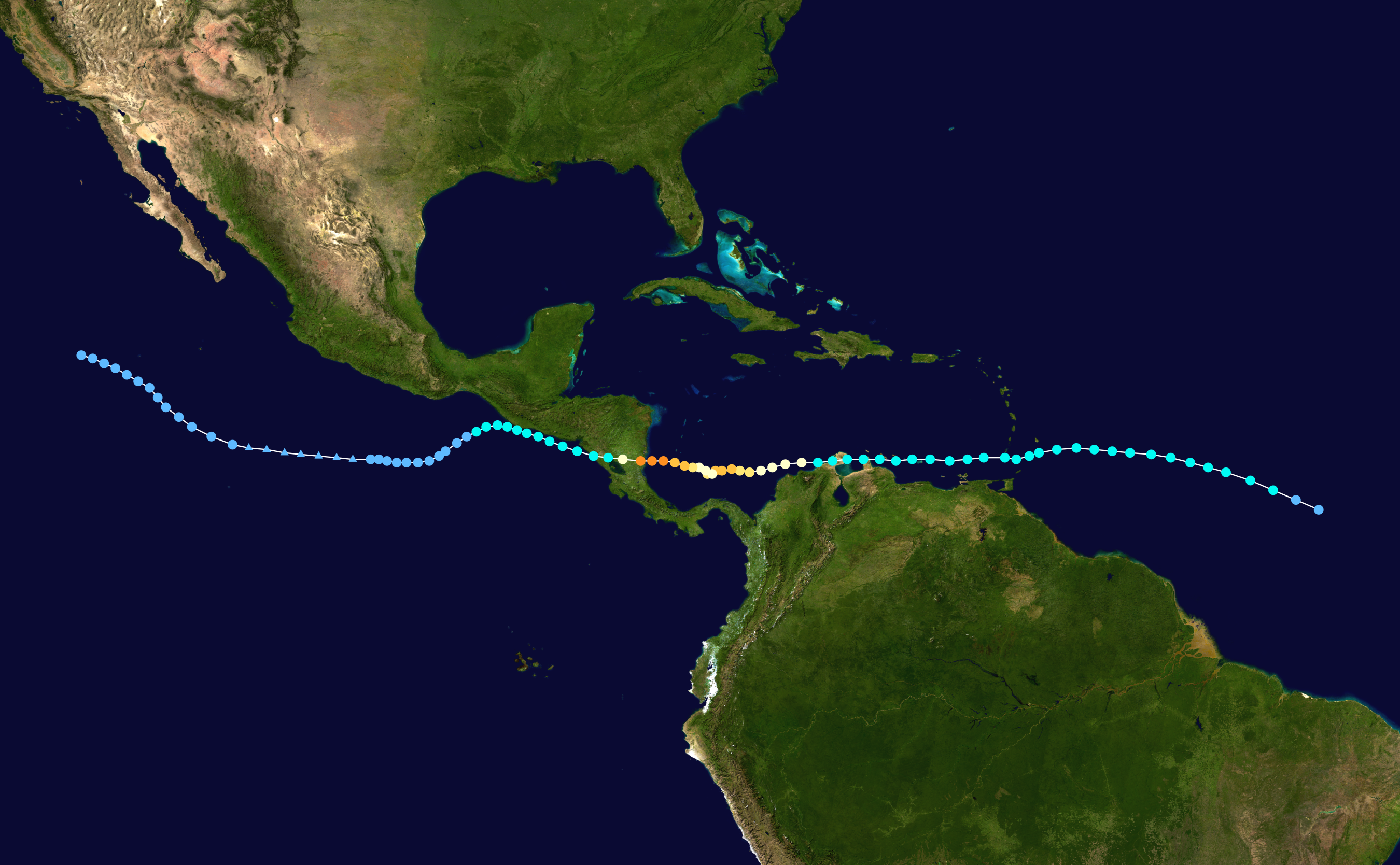
Storm track of Hurricane Joan, the track continuing into the Pacific Ocean is the track of Tropical Storm Miriam.

October 1

- 0000 UTC – Tropical Storm Isaac reached peak intensity; maximum sustained winds were at 45 mph and the minimum central pressure was at 1005 mbar.
- 1200 UTC (8 p.m. EDT) – Tropical Depression Isaac dissipates near Grenada.

October 10

- 1800 UTC (2 p.m. EDT) – Tropical Depression Seventeen forms.

October 11

- 0600 UTC (2 a.m. EDT) – Tropical Depression Seventeen strengthens into Tropical Storm Joan.

October 17

- 0000 UTC (8 p.m. EDT October 16) – Tropical Storm Joan makes landfall in Venezuela with winds of 60 mph.
- 0600 UTC (2 a.m. EDT) – Tropical Storm Joan makes landfall in the Guajira Peninsula in Venezuela with winds of 65 mph.

October 18

- 0000 UTC (8 p.m. EDT October 17) – Tropical Storm Joan strengthens into Hurricane Joan.

October 19

- 0000 UTC (8 p.m. EDT October 18) – Hurricane Joan strengthens into a category 2 hurricane.

October 20

- Unknown time: Tropical Depression Eighteen forms north of Colombia.
- 0000 UTC (8 p.m. EDT October 19) – Hurricane Joan strengthens into a category 3 hurricane.
- 0600 UTC (2 a.m. EDT) – Hurricane Joan weakens to a category 2 hurricane.

October 21

- Unknown time: Tropical Depression Eighteen dissipates.
- 0000 UTC (8 p.m. EDT October 20) – Hurricane Joan weakens into a category 1 hurricane.
- 0600 UTC (2 a.m. EDT) – Hurricane Joan strengthens back to a category 2 hurricane.

October 22

- 0000 UTC (8 p.m. EDT October 21) – Hurricane Joan strengthens to a category 4 hurricane.
- 1100 UTC (7 a.m. EDT) – Hurricane Joan makes landfall south of Bluefields, Nicaragua with winds at 145 mph.
- 1800 UTC (2 p.m. EDT) – Hurricane Joan rapidly weakened to a category 1 hurricane.

October 23

- 0600 UTC (2 a.m. EDT) – Hurricane Joan weakens to a tropical storm and exits into the Pacific Ocean, Tropical Storm Joan is renamed Tropical Storm Miriam.

=== November ===
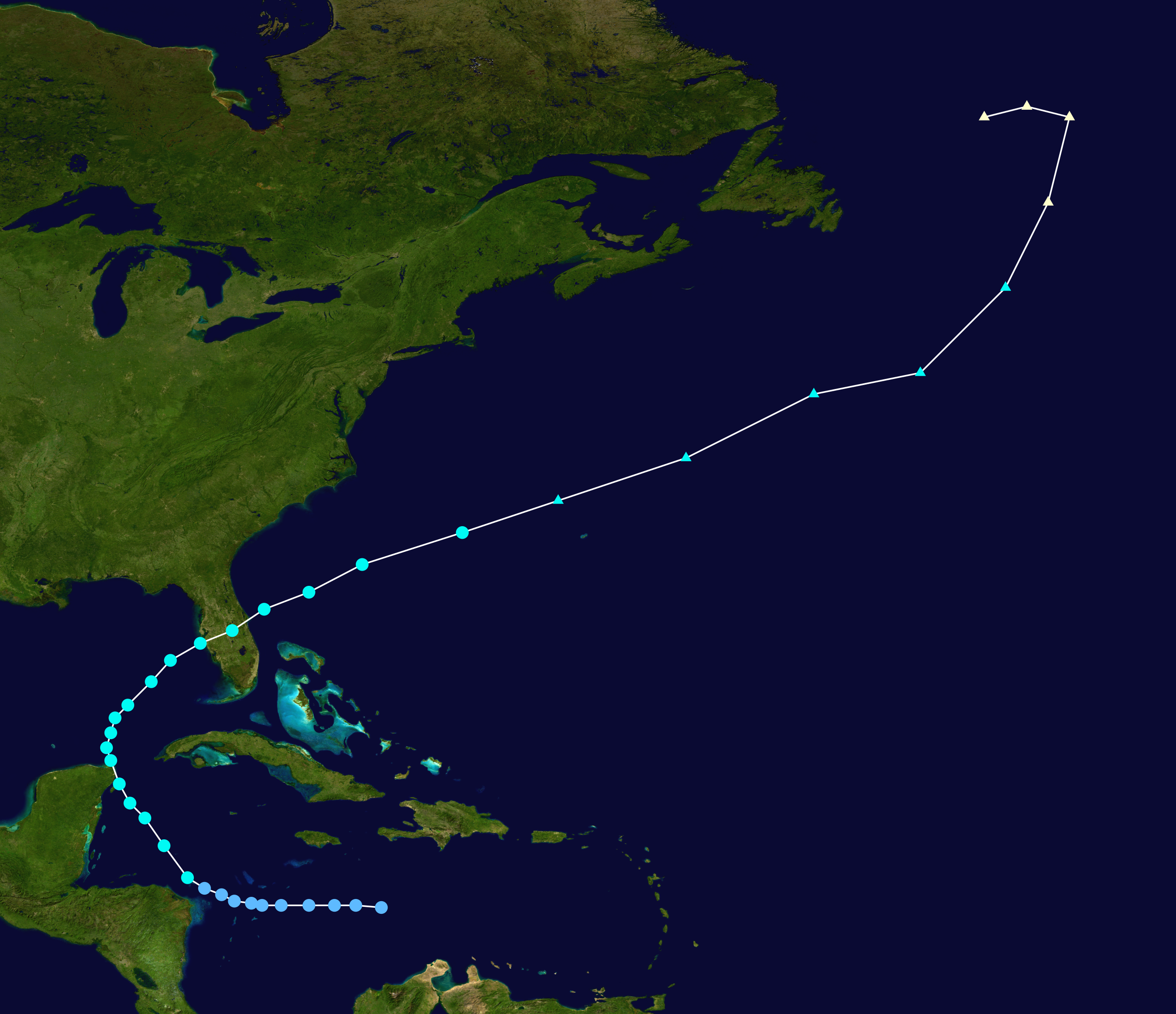
Storm path of Tropical Storm Keith

November 17

- 1700 UTC (1 p.m. EDT) – Tropical Depression Twelve forms in the central Caribbean Sea.

November 20

- 0500 UTC (1 a.m. EDT) – Tropical Depression Twelve strengthens into Tropical Storm Keith.

November 21

- 0800 UTC (4 a.m. EDT) – Tropical Storm Keith makes landfall in the Yucatán Peninsula with winds of 70 mph.
- 0500 UTC (1 a.m. EDT) – Tropical Storm Keith makes landfall in Sarasota, Florida with winds of 65 mph.

November 24

- 1700 UTC (1 p.m. EDT) – Tropical Storm Keith becomes extratropical while about 145 miles northwest of Bermuda.

November 30

- The 1988 Atlantic hurricane season officially ends.

== See also ==
- Lists of Atlantic hurricanes
- Timeline of the 1988 Pacific hurricane season
