= Hurricane Debby (1988) =

Category 1 Atlantic and Pacific hurricane in 1988

Hurricane Debby Tropical Depression Seventeen-E
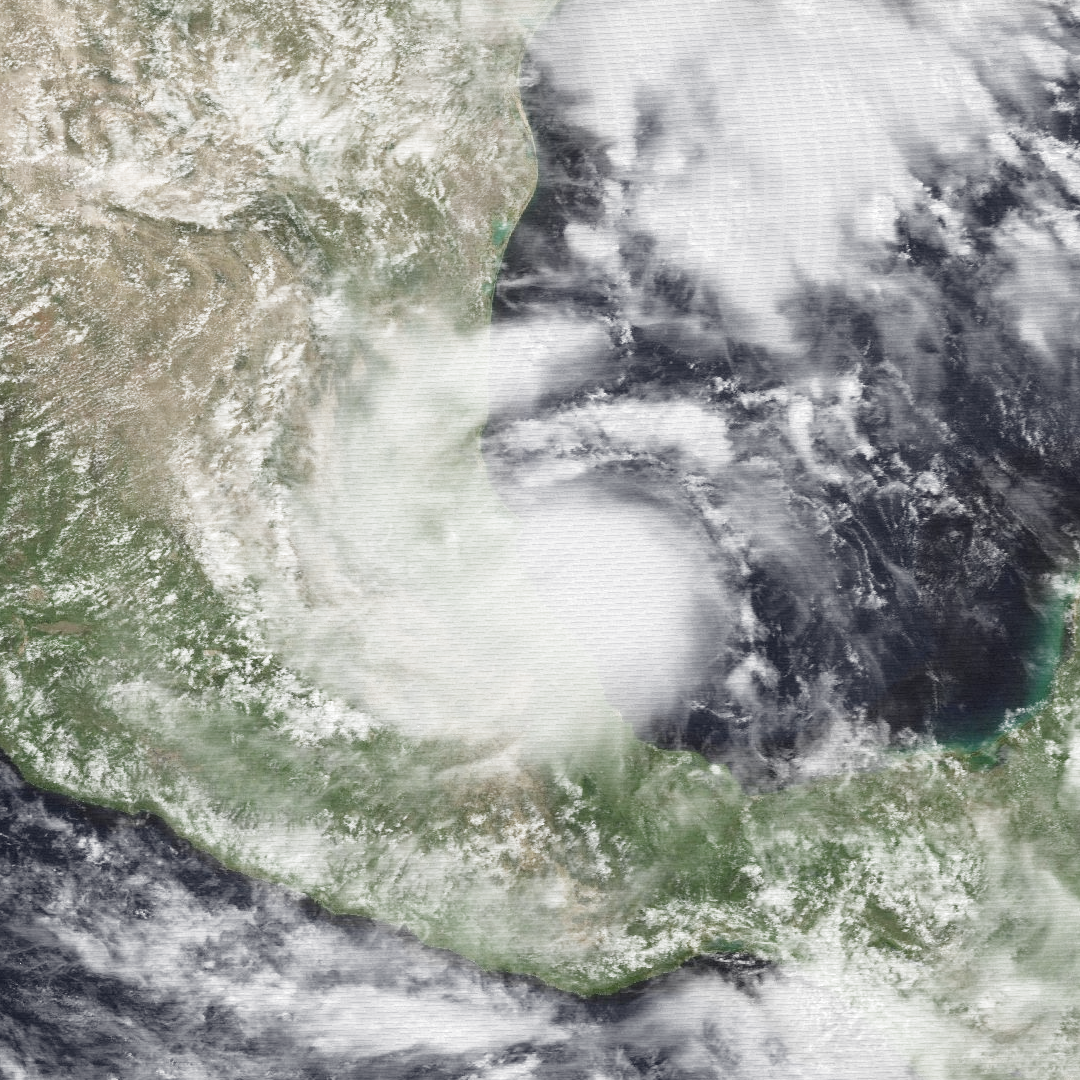
- Debby at peak intensity shortly before landfall in Veracruz on September 2

Meteorological history
- Formed: August 31, 1988
- Dissipated: September 8, 1988

Category 1 hurricane
- 1-minute sustained (SSHWS/NWS)
- Highest winds: 80 mph (130 km/h)
- Lowest pressure: 987 mbar (hPa); 29.15 inHg

Overall effects
- Fatalities: 20 direct
- Areas affected: Mexico
- IBTrACS
- Part of the 1988 Atlantic and Pacific hurricane seasons

Hurricane Debby was the first hurricane to strike the Mexican state of Veracruz since Hurricane Anna in 1956. The eighth tropical cyclone, fourth named storm, and the first hurricane of the 1988 Atlantic hurricane season, Debby developed from a tropical wave off the west coast of the Yucatan Peninsula on August 31. The system slowly intensified as it tracked west-northwestward toward Mexico, eventually reaching tropical storm status on September 2. Thereafter, Debby began to rapidly strengthen, and the storm was upgraded to a hurricane later that day. After attaining peak winds of 75 mph (120 km/h), Debby made landfall near Tuxpan, Veracruz early on September 3. The hurricane quickly weakened inland, but managed to reach the eastern Pacific on September 5. Debby became Tropical Depression Seventeen-E, which moved northwest but remained poorly organized due to wind shear and dissipated on September 8.

Heavy rainfall caused flooding in the state of Veracruz. Thousands of people were forced from their homes as rivers rose, including upwards of 30,000 fleeing for shelter after the Tuxpan River exceeded its bank. About 8,000 residents of the city of Álamo were rendered homeless. Flooding in Poza Rica forced the rescue of dozens of people from their cars and homes. Several homes in the city were swept away, while debris such as tree branches and trash blocked water runoff. Water, mudslides, and rocks blocked numerous roads in the area. In combination with Hurricane Kristy in the Pacific Ocean, approximately 50,000 people were left homeless in Mexico. At least 20 fatalities were attributed to Debby.

== Meteorological history ==
Map plotting the storm's track and intensity, according to the Saffir–Simpson scale Map key Saffir–Simpson scale Tropical depression (≤38 mph, ≤62 km/h) Tropical storm (39–73 mph, 63–118 km/h) Category 1 (74–95 mph, 119–153 km/h) Category 2 (96–110 mph, 154–177 km/h) Category 3 (111–129 mph, 178–208 km/h) Category 4 (130–156 mph, 209–251 km/h) Category 5 (≥157 mph, ≥252 km/h) Unknown Storm type Tropical cyclone Subtropical cyclone Extratropical cyclone, remnant low, tropical disturbance, or monsoon depression

A relatively strong tropical wave emerged into the Atlantic Ocean from the northwest coast of Africa on August 15. Moving westward, the wave split while well east of the Lesser Antilles, with a portion developing into Tropical Depression Seven on August 21, which eventually strengthened into Tropical Storm Chris. The remaining portion of the wave continued westward and reached the Caribbean Sea as a disorganized center of showers. During the night of August 29, some cloud banding developed, followed by the formation of a low-level center over the Yucatán Peninsula on August 30. Shortly after entering the Bay of Campeche on August 31, the system was given a T1.5 rating on the Dvorak scale, based on appearance on satellite imagery. As a result, the wave developed into Tropical Depression Eight at 18:00 UTC on August 31. Cloud banding and outflow patterns became further organized on September 1. The depression moved generally west-northwestward, steered by a high pressure area situated over the Eastern United States.

On September 2, the depression organized significantly. Based on a reconnaissance aircraft flight and satellite imagery, it is estimated that the cyclone intensified into Tropical Storm Debby around 06:00 UTC. Later that day, another reconnaissance flight observed sustained winds of 90 mph (140 km/h) at 1,500 ft (460 m) and 80 mph (130 km/h) at the surface of the storm. At 18:00 UTC on September 2, Debby became a Category 1 hurricane while centered only about 35 mi (56 km) offshore Mexico. Six hours later, Debby made landfall about 23 mi (37 km) south of Tuxpan, Veracruz, with winds of 75 mph (120 km/h) – the highest sustained wind speed associated with the storm. Debby was the first hurricane to strike the state of Veracruz since Hurricane Anna in 1956. Additionally, Debby simultaneously attained its minimum barometric pressure of 991 mbar (29.3 inHg). The hurricane rapidly weakened over the Sierra Madre Oriental mountains of Mexico, weakening to a tropical storm by 06:00 UTC on September 3 and falling to tropical depression intensity about 12 hours later. However, the circulation managed to remain intact and reached the Pacific Ocean between Manzanillo and Puerto Vallarta on September 5.

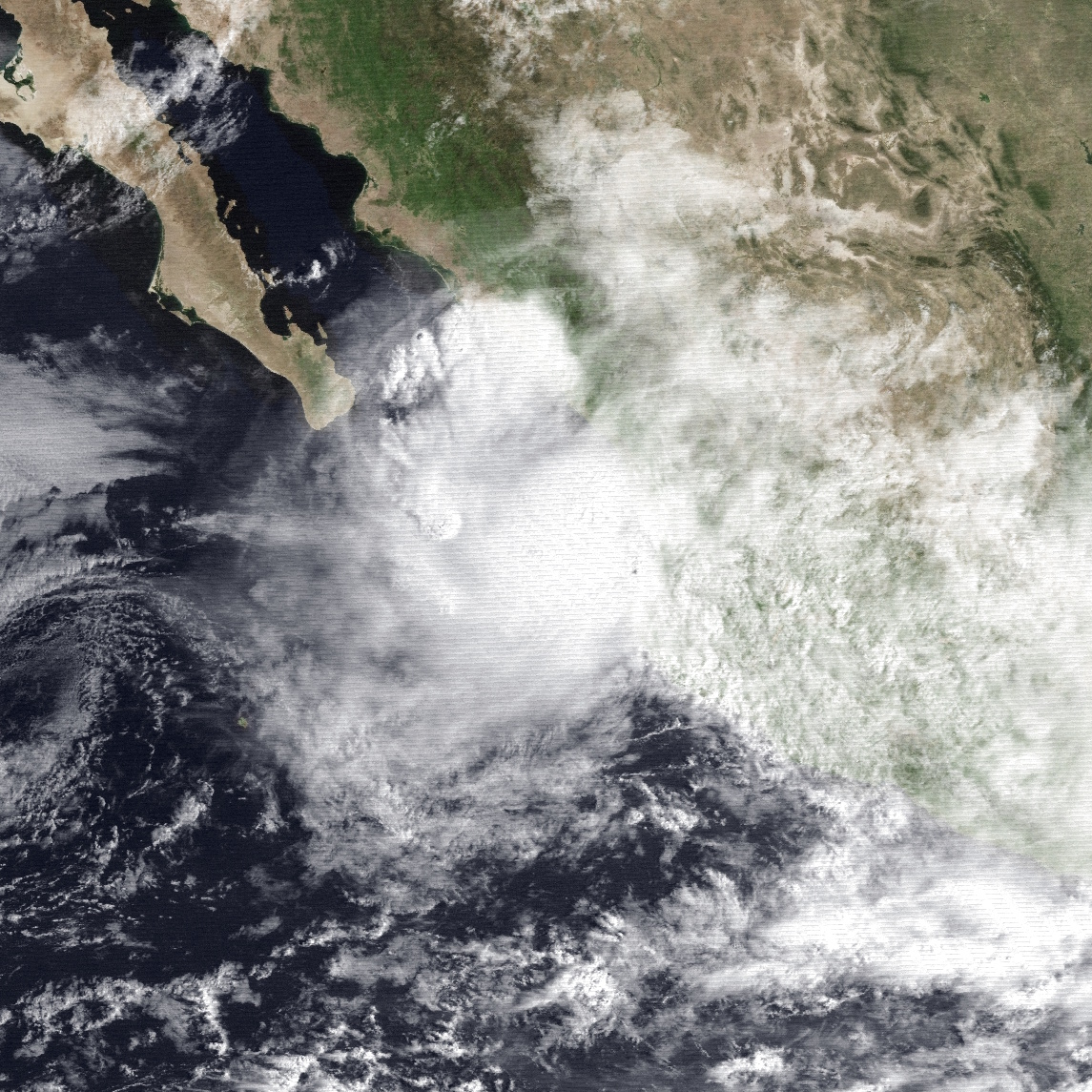
Tropical Depression Seventeen-E on September 5

Operationally, the National Hurricane Center treated the storm as a new tropical cyclone, rather than a continuation of Debby. As a result, the system became Tropical Depression Seventeen-E, with advisories beginning at 21:00 UTC after the remnants of Debby became organized enough to be classified as such. Little movement occurred, with the depression remaining stationary off the coast of Manazillo. Although the depression was a poorly-organized cyclone, the possibility that it could re-intensify into a tropical storm in the small and narrow Gulf of California existed. However, due to the depression's proximity to land and increasing wind shear, the chances of the system strengthening into a tropical storm again became doubtful. By September 7, the depression was under the influence of a low-level trough and weak steering currents. The depression soon became difficult to track via satellite imagery. Most of the deep convection and outflow diminished by September 8, reducing the system to a low-level swirl. The depression dissipated around 18:00 UTC, while situated in the Gulf of California between La Paz, Baja California Sur, and Culiacán, Sinaloa.

== Preparations and impact ==
Multiple tropical cyclone warnings and watches were issued in accordance with Hurricane Debby. The first was a tropical storm warning for Santa Cruz to the city of Veracruz at 12:00 UTC on September 2. About four hours later, the portion of the tropical storm warning from Santa Cruz to Punta Jerez. The remaining portion of the tropical storm warnings – from Punta Jerez to Veracruz – was upgraded to a hurricane warning at 18:30 UTC on September 2. The portions of the hurricane warning between Cabo Rojo and Punta Jerez as well as from Poza Rica to Veracruz were downgraded to a tropical storm warning at 22:00 UTC. All watches and warnings were discontinued at 02:30 UTC on September 3. In the city of Tuxpan, the police, Mexican Army, and Red Cross were placed on standby.

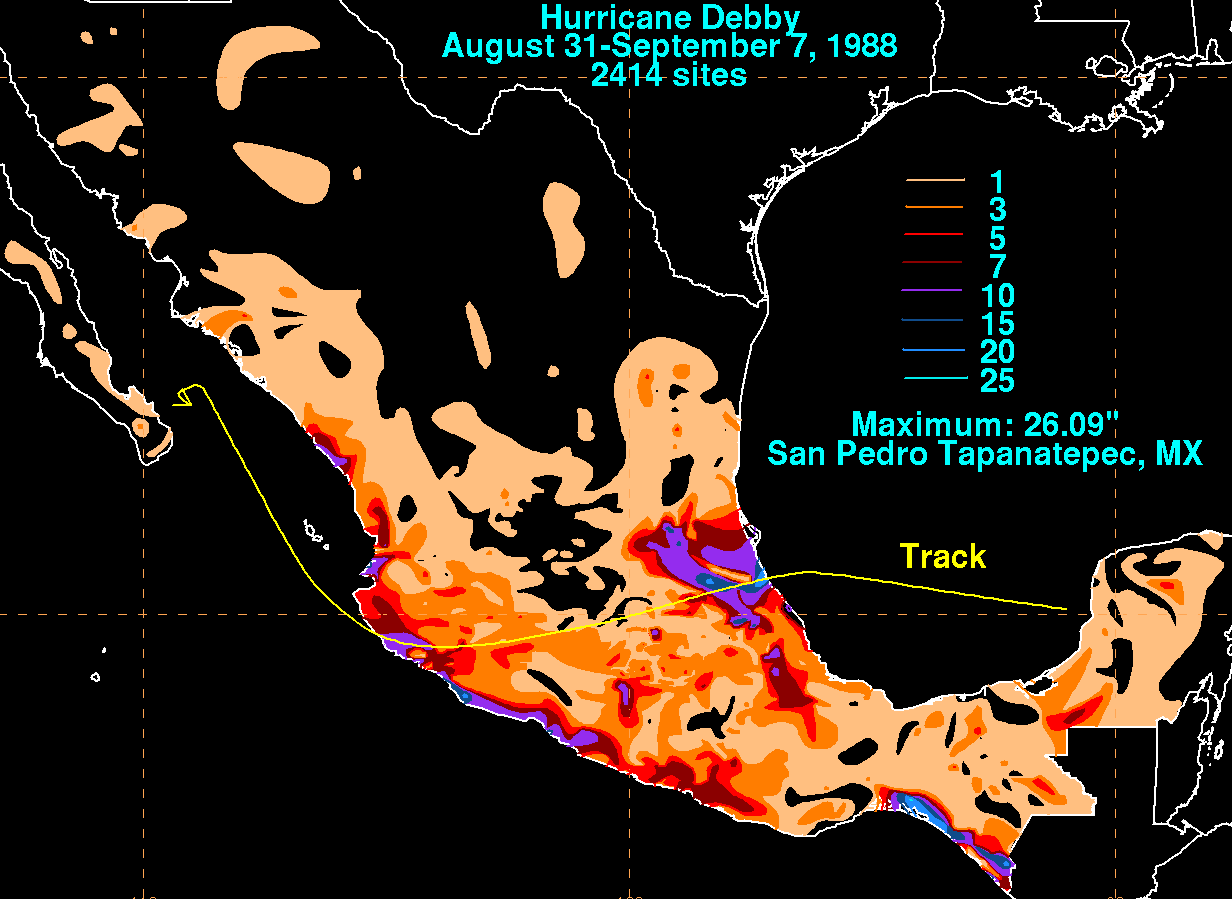
Rainfall totals from Hurricane Debby in Mexico

Locally heavy flooding was reported in Tuxpan. Streets were inundated and power outages occurred, while more than 500 people lost their homes. The Tuxpan River overflowed its banks at Álamo. A local Red Cross official stated that most of the town was submerged in only a few minutes. About 5,000 homes were flooded by September 3, forcing approximately 30,000 people to flee. Additional flooding in the town resulted in about 8,000 people being left homeless. In Poza Rica, downed tree trunks and trash caused water runoffs to be blocked. Mud and rocks blocked roads and dozens were rescued from house and car flooding. A number of homes built along the gullies were washed away. The Cazones River overflowed, rendering a highway connecting Tampico to Veracruz impassable. The Cotaxtla River exceeded its bank in Cotaxtla, rupturing nine oil and natural gas lines. Pemex works quickly closed the pipelines. In Mexico City, about 600 people fled for shelter as rivers in the area began to swell. Ramón Aguirre Velázquez, the Head of Government of Mexico City, described the rainfall as the heaviest in 20 years.

A total of 20 deaths were attributed to Hurricane Debby, with 10 fatalities in the state of Veracruz alone. Three were caused by a landslide in Papalanta that crushed two homes. Three other storm-related deaths were reported with house-crushing landslides in Poza Rica. Four people died and sixteen were injured in Ixtlahuaco – a town in Hidalgo about 100 mi (160 km) northeast of Mexico City – when a mudslide crushed three homes.

The combined effects of Debby and Hurricane Kristy, which impacted Mexico's Pacific coast around the same time, rendered about 50,000 people homeless. Emergency crews worked to provide shelter for those left homeless. Relief supplies were delivered by boat to towns isolated by floodwaters. Local health officials in Mexico City warned of the possibility of outbreaks of hepatitis, typhoid, and other waterborne diseases. In response to the threat, homes located in the northern portions of the city near the Río de los Remedios were fumigated.

== See also ==
- Other storms of the same name
- List of Category 1 Atlantic hurricanes
- List of Atlantic–Pacific crossover hurricanes
- Hurricane Diana (1990) – A Category 2 hurricane that devastated the region just 2 years later
- Hurricane Gert (1993) – A very deadly Category 2 hurricane that took a similar track and likewise crossed into the Pacific
