= Stephen Vasciannie =

Jamaican law professor

Stephen Vasciannie CD
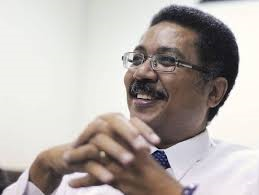

Jamaican Ambassador to the United States
- In office 17 July 2012 – 17 July 2015
- Prime Minister: Portia Simpson-Miller
- Preceded by: Audrey Marks
- Succeeded by: Ralph Thomas

Personal details
- Born: Stephen Charles Vasciannie; 17 January 1960 (age 66) Kingston, Saint Andrew, Jamaica
- Spouse: Lisa
- Children: 2
- Education: University of the West Indies (BSc); Balliol College, Oxford (BA); University of Cambridge (LLM); University of Oxford (DPhil)
- Occupation: Lawyer, diplomat, academic

Stephen Charles Vasciannie CD (born 17 January 1960) is a Jamaican legal scholar, academic administrator, and politician. He is a professor of international law at the University of the West Indies, Mona.

Vasciannie served as the principal of the Norman Manley Law School from 2008 to 2010, as Jamaica's ambassador to the United States from 2012 to 2015, and as the principal of the University of Technology, Jamaica, from 2017 to 2020.

== Early life and education ==
Vasciannie attended St Richard's primary school and attended Kingston College from 1971 to 1978.

== In politics and government ==
Vasciannie was one of the founding members of the National Democratic Movement (NDM) along with former Prime Minister of Jamaica Bruce Golding. He served as Deputy Solicitor-General until 2007. The Public Services Commission recommended that year that he be appointed Solicitor-General, however, Golding, whose relationship with Vasciannie had deteriorated since Golding's departure from the NDM, did not accept Vasciannie's nomination; instead, Golding fired all the members of the commission, and the new commission members appointed chose Douglas Leys to assume the office of Solicitor-General instead. Preceding the People's National Party victory in the 2012 general election Vasciannie was named Jamaica's ambassador to the United States in June 2012, and succeeded Jamaican businesswoman Audrey Marks, who was appointed under the Golding administration.

== Other activities ==
In 2006, when Dehring Bunting and Golding (DB&G) was purchased by the Bank of Nova Scotia, the new owners appointed him DB&G's new chairman of the board. That year he was also elected to his first term as a member of the United Nations International Law Commission (UNILC). He was appointed principal of the Norman Manley Law School in July 2008 after the death of Keith Sobion. In 2010, Anglican Diocese of Jamaica Bishop Alfred Reid wrote to him to ask him to serve as chairman of the board of governors of Kingston College, which he accepted, succeeding Crafton Miller. He was elected to a second term on the UNILC in November 2011. He is also a professor of law at the University of the West Indies.

== Personal life ==
Vasciannie did his secondary education at Kingston College (Jamaica), where he was head boy. He went on to the University of the West Indies, where he earned a B.Sc. in economics with first class honours, and was the recipient of the UWI Open Scholarship in 1978. He received a Rhodes Scholarship to study at the University of Oxford in 1981; he would later earn a B.A. in jurisprudence from Oxford, an LL.M. in international law from Gonville and Caius College, Cambridge, and a Ph.D. in international law from Oxford.
