= Passion Island =

Passion Island may refer to:

- An alternative name for Clipperton Island
- Passion Island (film), a 1927 British drama film
- Isla de Pasion, a tourist attraction in Cozumel, Mexico
