= Howard Gregory (bishop) =

Anglican bishop in Jamaica

The Most Reverend Howard Gregory OJ
- Archbishop of the Church of the Province of the West Indies; Bishop of Jamaica and the Cayman Islands
- Church: Church in the Province of the West Indies
- Diocese: Jamaica and the Cayman Islands
- In office: 2012–2024
- Predecessor: Alfred Reid
- Other post: Bishop of Montego Bay (2002–2012)

Orders
- Ordination: 1973 (diaconate); 1974 (priesthood)
- Consecration: 2002

Personal details
- Born: 1950 or 1951 (age 75–76)
- Education: University of the West Indies

Howard Kingsley Ainsworth Gregory OJ is a Jamaican Anglican bishop. He was bishop of the Anglican Diocese of Jamaica as its bishop starting in 2012, and he became Archbishop of the West Indies in 2019 before retiring from both posts on December 31, 2024.

Gregory was educated at the University of the West Indies. He was ordained a deacon in 1973, priest in 1974.

Gregory was the chaplain of his old university. He was then a lecturer at the Church Teachers’ College in Mandeville then warden at the United Theological College of the West Indies. He became Bishop of Montego Bay in 2002; he was consecrated on 17 May at the Cathedral of St. Jago de la Vega, Spanish Town.

Gregory was elected as the thirteenth Archbishop of the Church in the Province of the West Indies (CPWI) in May 2019. In October 2023, he was awarded the Order of Jamaica.

Gregory is married and has one daughter.

== Notes ==
Anglican Communion titles
Preceded by Alfred Reid	Bishop of Jamaica and the Cayman Islands; 2012–2024	Vacant
Preceded by John Holder	Archbishop of the Church in the Province of the West Indies; 2019–2024	Succeeded by Philip S. Wright
