= Cecil de Carteret =

Anglican cleric (1886–1932)

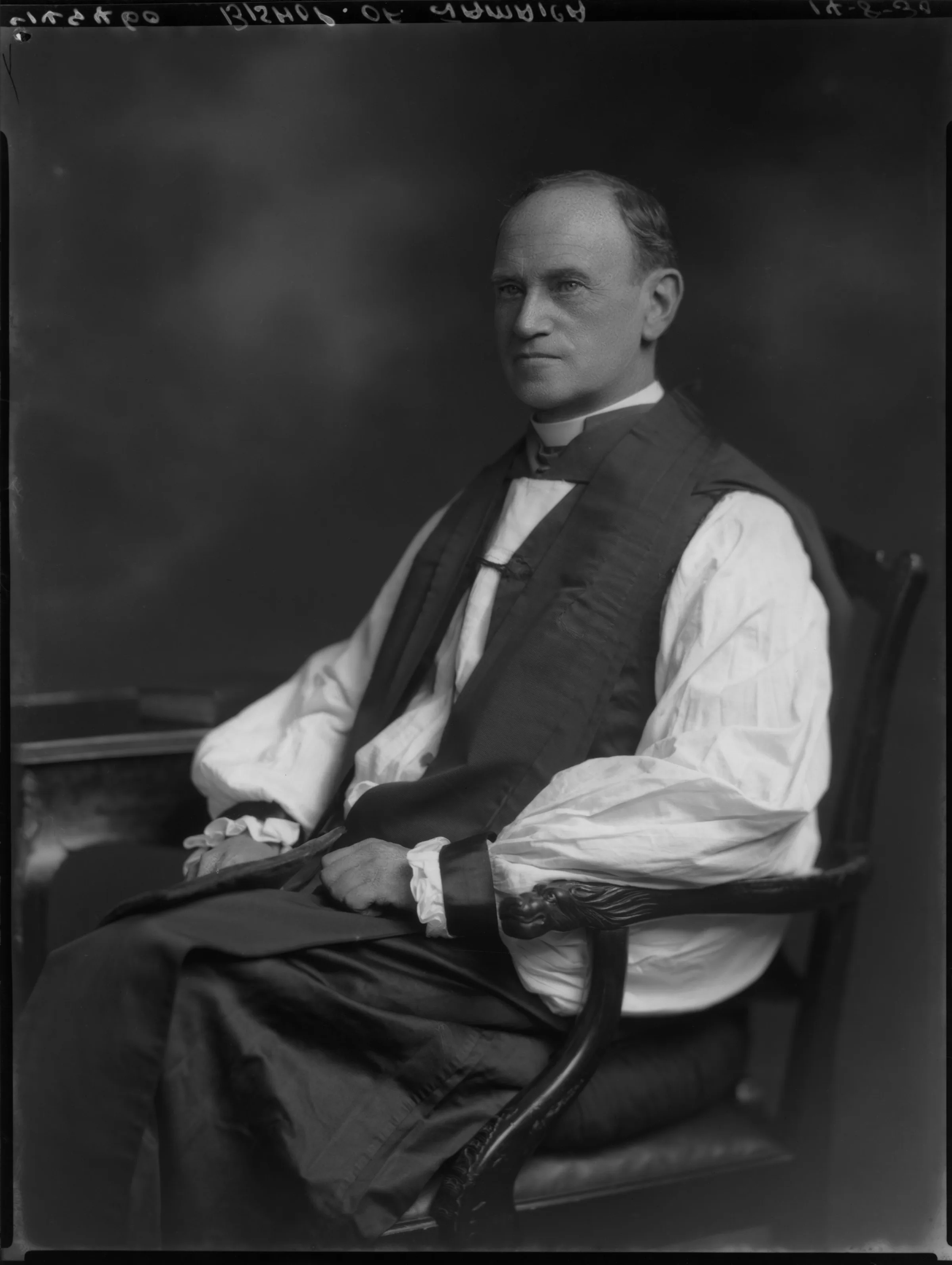
De Carteret in 1930

George Frederick Cecil de Carteret (1886 – 3 January 1932) was an Anglican cleric, and the long-serving Bishop of Jamaica from 1916 until 1931.

He was educated at Wadham College, Oxford and ordained in 1889. His first posts were curacies at Canterbury, Tulse Hill, and Cheltenham. Later he held incumbencies at St Paul's, Southwark and Christ Church, East Greenwich.

In 1913 he was appointed Assistant Bishop of Jamaica before unanimous election to be its diocesan bishop three years later. He was consecrated a bishop on 18 October 1913 by Randall Davidson, Archbishop of Canterbury, at Southwark Cathedral.

He resigned the See of Jamaica effective 21 March 1931 and returned to England, where his appointment as an Assistant Bishop of Leicester was announced for 1 January 1932; but he was very ill, and (having become a Doctor of Divinity (DD)) he died in convalescence in Canterbury on 3 January, not having been able to take up the Leicester appointment.

Church of England titles
Preceded by Enos Nuttall	Bishop of Jamaica; 1916–1931	Succeeded by William Hardie
