= Hurricane Gilbert =

Category 5 Atlantic hurricane in 1988

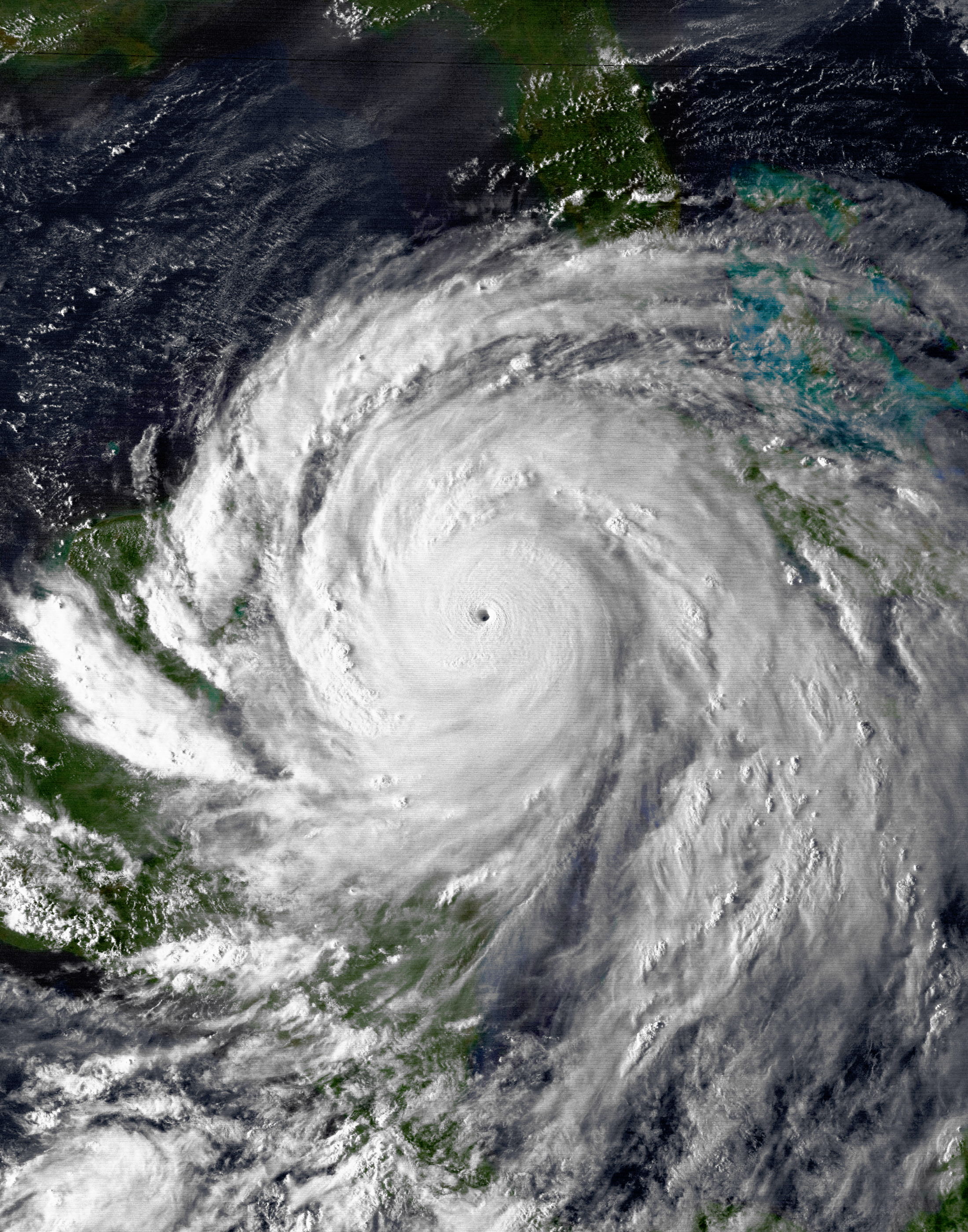
- Gilbert near peak intensity while off the coast of the Yucatan Peninsula on September 13

Meteorological history
- Formed: September 8, 1988
- Extratropical: September 19, 1988
- Dissipated: September 19, 1988

Category 5 major hurricane
- 1-minute sustained (SSHWS/NWS)
- Highest winds: 185 mph (295 km/h)
- Lowest pressure: 888 mbar (hPa); 26.22 inHg (Second-lowest in the Atlantic basin)

Overall effects
- Fatalities: 318
- Damage: $2.98 billion (1988 USD)
- Areas affected: Lesser Antilles, Puerto Rico, Venezuela, Haiti, Dominican Republic, Jamaica, Central America, Yucatan Peninsula, Mexico, Texas, South Central United States, Midwestern United States, Western Canada
- IBTrACS /
- Part of the 1988 Atlantic hurricane season

Hurricane Gilbert was a large and extremely powerful tropical cyclone that formed during the 1988 Atlantic hurricane season, which peaked as a Category 5 hurricane. The storm brought widespread destruction to the Caribbean and the Gulf of Mexico, and is tied with 1969's Hurricane Camille as the third-most intense tropical cyclone at landfall in the Atlantic Ocean. It was also the most intense tropical cyclone on record in the Atlantic basin in terms of barometric pressure, until it was surpassed by Hurricane Wilma in 2005. Gilbert was also one of the largest tropical cyclones ever observed in the Atlantic basin. At one point, its tropical storm-force winds measured 575 mi (925 km) in diameter. In addition, Gilbert was the most intense tropical cyclone in recorded history to strike Mexico.

The seventh named storm, third hurricane and first major hurricane of the 1988 Atlantic hurricane season, Gilbert developed from a tropical wave on September 8 while located 400 mi (640 km) east of Barbados. Following intensification into a tropical storm the next day, Gilbert steadily strengthened as it tracked west-northwestward into the Caribbean Sea. On September 10, Gilbert attained hurricane intensity, and rapidly intensified into a Category 3 hurricane on September 11. After striking Jamaica the following day, rapid intensification occurred once again, and the storm became a Category 5 hurricane on the Saffir-Simpson scale with peak 1-minute sustained winds of 185 mph (298 km/h), late on September 13. Gilbert then weakened slightly, and made landfall on the Yucatán Peninsula later that day while maintaining Category 5 intensity. After landfall, Gilbert weakened rapidly over the Yucatán Peninsula, and emerged into the Gulf of Mexico as a Category 2 storm on September 15. Gradual intensification occurred as Gilbert tracked across the Gulf of Mexico, and the storm made landfall as a Category 3 hurricane in mainland Mexico on September 16. The hurricane gradually weakened after landfall, and eventually dissipated on September 19 over the Midwestern United States.

Gilbert wrought havoc in the Caribbean and the Gulf of Mexico for nearly nine days. In total, it killed 318 people and caused about $2.98 billion (1988 USD) in damages along its path. As a result of the extensive damage caused by Gilbert, the World Meteorological Organization retired the name in the spring of 1989; it was replaced with Gordon for the 1994 hurricane season.

== Meteorological history ==
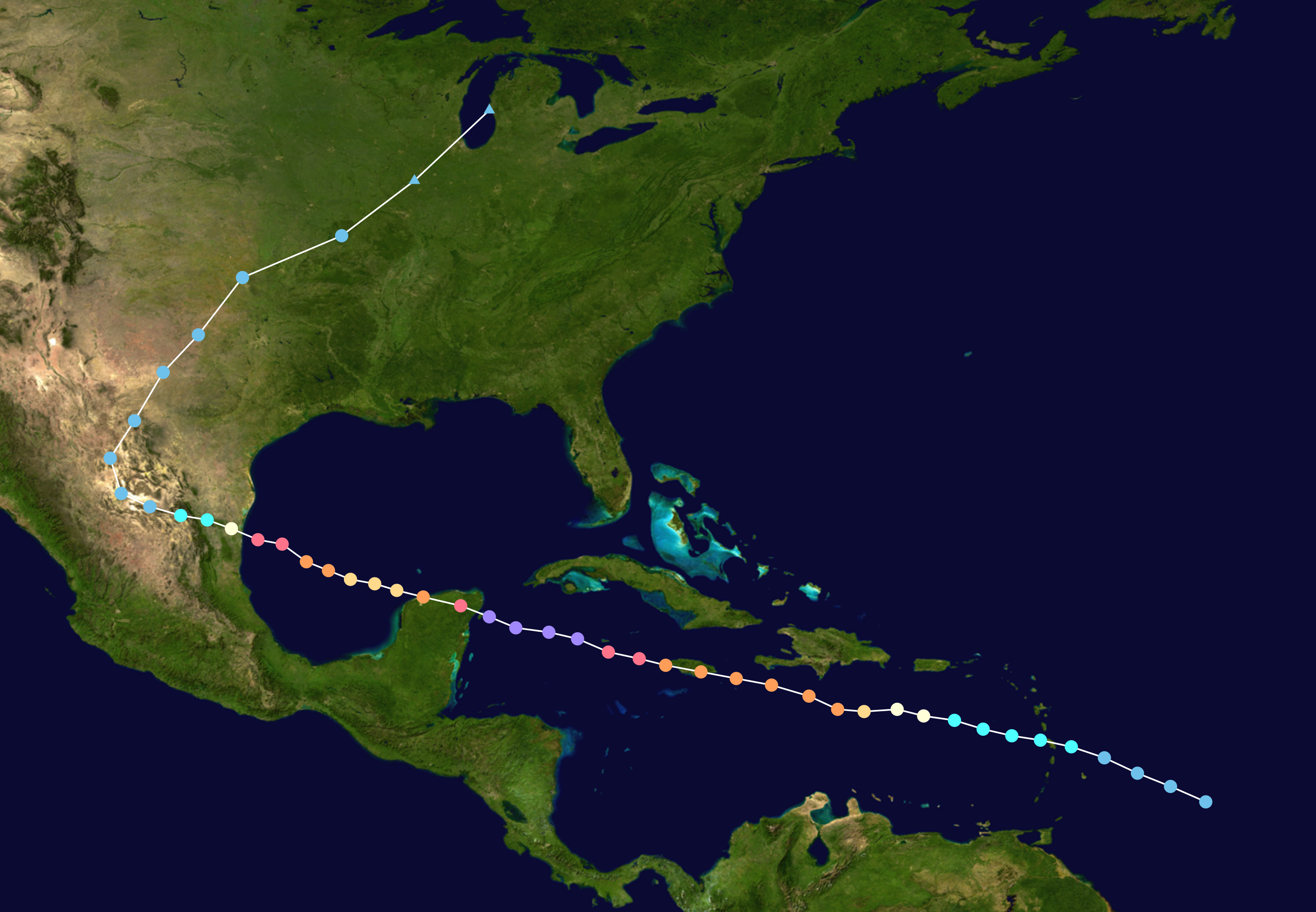
Map plotting the storm's track and intensity, according to the Saffir–Simpson scale Map key Saffir–Simpson scale Tropical depression (≤38 mph, ≤62 km/h) Tropical storm (39–73 mph, 63–118 km/h) Category 1 (74–95 mph, 119–153 km/h) Category 2 (96–110 mph, 154–177 km/h) Category 3 (111–129 mph, 178–208 km/h) Category 4 (130–156 mph, 209–251 km/h) Category 5 (≥157 mph, ≥252 km/h) Unknown Storm type Tropical cyclone Subtropical cyclone Extratropical cyclone, remnant low, tropical disturbance, or monsoon depression

The origins of Hurricane Gilbert trace back to an easterly tropical wave—an elongated low-pressure area moving from east to west—that crossed the northwestern coast of Africa on September 3, 1988. Over the subsequent days, the wave traversed the tropical Atlantic and developed a broad wind circulation extending just north of the equator. The system remained disorganized until September 8, when satellite images showed a defined circulation center approaching the Windward Islands. The following day, the National Hurricane Center (NHC) classified it as the twelfth tropical depression of the annual hurricane season using the Dvorak technique, when it was located about 400 mi (640 km) east of Barbados. The depression proceeded toward the west-northwest, and while moving through the Lesser Antilles near Martinique, it gained enough strength to be designated as Tropical Storm Gilbert.

After becoming a tropical storm, Gilbert underwent a period of significant strengthening. Passing to the south of Dominican Republic and Haiti, it became a hurricane late on September 10 and further strengthened to Category 3 intensity on the Saffir–Simpson scale the next day. At that time, Gilbert was classified as a major hurricane with sustained winds of 130 mph (210 km/h) and a minimum barometric pressure of 960 mbar (960 hPa; 28 inHg). On September 12, the hurricane made landfall on the eastern coast of Jamaica at this intensity; its 15 mi (24 km)-wide eye moved from east to west across the entire length of the island.

Most intense Atlantic hurricanes
Rank	Hurricane	Season	Pressure	
Rank	Hurricane	Season	hPa	inHg
1	Wilma	2005	882	26.05
2	Gilbert	1988	888	26.23
3	"Labor Day"	1935	892	26.34
3	Melissa	2025	892	26.34
5	Rita	2005	895	26.43
5	Milton	2024	895	26.43
7	Allen	1980	899	26.55
8	Camille	1969	900	26.58
9	Katrina	2005	902	26.64
10	Mitch	1998	905	26.73
10	Dean	2007	905	26.73
Source: HURDAT

Gilbert strengthened rapidly after emerging from the coast of Jamaica. As the hurricane brushed the Cayman Islands, a reporting station on Grand Cayman recorded a wind gust of 156 mph (251 km/h) as the storm passed just to the southeast on September 13. Explosive intensification continued until Gilbert reached a minimum pressure of 888 mbar (888 hPa; 26.2 inHg) with maximum sustained flight-level winds of 185 mph (298 km/h), having intensified by 72 mbar in a space of 24 hours. (Note: While the storm was active, the National Hurricane Center estimated the minimum pressure to be 885 mbar (885 hPa; 26.1 inHg) based on reports from weather reconnaissance aircraft. However, this estimate was revised to 888 mbar (888 hPa; 26.2 inHg) during post-storm analysis, as it was discovered that the pressure transducer used to calculate the aircraft's static pressure had a bias towards low pressures.) This pressure was the lowest ever observed in the Western Hemisphere and made Gilbert the most intense Atlantic hurricane on record until it was surpassed by Hurricane Wilma in 2005.

Gilbert then weakened somewhat, but remained a Category 5 hurricane as it made landfall for a second time on the island of Cozumel, and then a third time on Mexico's Yucatán Peninsula on September 14. This made it the first Category 5 hurricane to make landfall in the Atlantic basin since Hurricane David hit Hispaniola in 1979. The minimum pressure at landfall in Cozumel was estimated to be 900 millibars (27 inHg), along with maximum sustained winds of 160 mph (260 km/h). The storm weakened quickly while crossing land before it emerged into the Gulf of Mexico as a Category 2 hurricane. Gilbert re-strengthened rapidly, however, and made landfall for a final time as a Category 3 hurricane near La Pesca, Tamaulipas on September 16, with winds of about 125 mph (201 km/h).

On September 17, Gilbert brushed the inland city of Monterrey, Nuevo León before taking a sharp turn to the north. The storm spawned 29 tornadoes in Texas on September 18, and then moved across Oklahoma. It was absorbed by a low-pressure system over Missouri on September 19, and finally became extratropical over Lake Michigan.

== Preparations ==
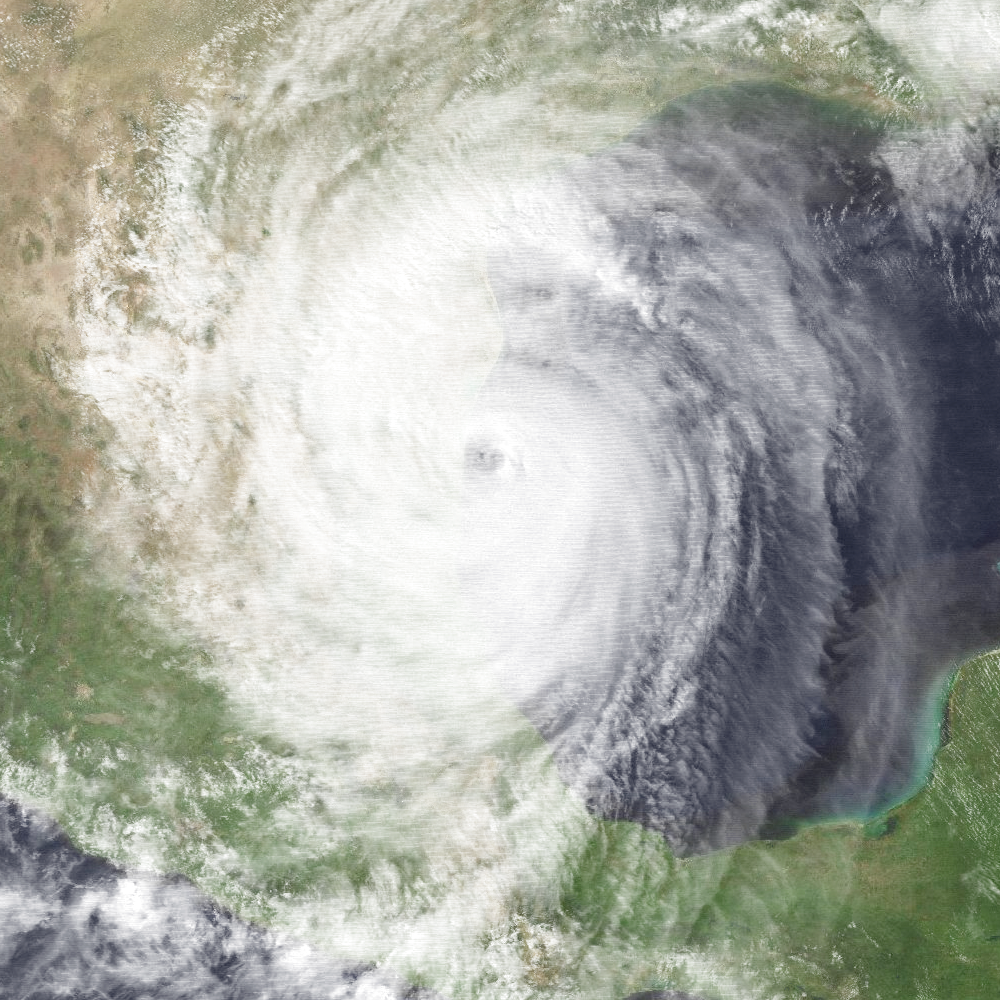
Hurricane Gilbert making landfall in Mexico on September 16.

Late on September 10, a tropical storm warning was issued by the National Hurricane Center (NHC) for the southern coast of the Dominican Republic alongside a hurricane watch for the Barahona Peninsula. The hurricane watch for Barahona was upgraded to a hurricane warning early on September 11. Later that day, hurricane watches were posted for the Dominican Republic's southern coast, Jamaica, and the southern coast of Cuba east of Cabo Cruz; the hurricane watch in Jamaica was upgraded to a hurricane warning by the end of the day. Hurricane warnings for the southern coast of Haiti were also posted on September 11.

On September 12, a hurricane watch was issued for the Cayman Islands, and the hurricane watch for the southern coast of Cuba was extended to Cienfuegos, with the portion of the watch east of Camagüey upgraded to a hurricane warning. That evening, the Yucatán Peninsula was placed under a hurricane watch between Felipe Carrillo Puerto and Progreso. This area included the resort cities of Cancún and Cozumel. The following day, hurricane watches were posted for Pinar del Río Province and Isla de la Juventud, and the Cayman Islands were placed under a hurricane warning. The watches in western Cuba and the Yucatán Peninsula were replaced with warnings at about mid-day September 13. As Gilbert approached the Yucatán Peninsula on September 14, the hurricane warning in the region was extended to cover the entire coast between Chetumal and Champotón, while a hurricane watch was posted for the northern district of Belize. Once Gilbert entered the Gulf of Mexico on September 15, hurricane watches were posted for the portion of the shore between Port Arthur and Tampico. Around noon that day, the hurricane watch was upgraded to a hurricane warning between Tampico and Port O'Connor.

The NHC advised small craft to remain in port in Puerto Rico and the United States Virgin Islands until weather conditions improved. Civil defense authorities in the Dominican Republic urged residents along the country's south coast to be prepared for strong winds, torrential rainfall, and rough seas. Gilberto Gutierrez, the civil defense planning director, estimated that 100 to 200 people fled their homes in the Barahona Peninsula. In Cuba, a state of emergency was declared for Granma, Guantánamo, and Santiago de Cuba provinces. Approximately 90,000 people in eastern Cuba evacuated from low-lying areas. Another 60,000 individuals fled their homes from low-lying areas of Pinar del Río Province and Isla de la Juventud. Some 4,000 Red Cross volunteers assisted with evacuations and medical needs in Cuba. Jamaican Prime Minister Edward Seaga alerted other government officials about the approaching storm, including police and armed forces, and ordered that the National Arena be used as a shelter, which thousands of people stayed at. Around 100,000 people evacuated from the Portmore area alone. The threat from Gilbert led airports to cancel inbound commercial flights, while ferry services were suspended across Kingston Harbour.

Cayman Airways evacuated residents from the Cayman Islands ahead of Gilbert. Authorities in Mexico estimated that approximately 75,000 people evacuated from parts of the Yucatán Peninsula, including tourists leaving resorts at places such as Cancún and Cozumel. As Gilbert approached northeastern Mexico, 16 shelters were opened in Matamoros, which sheltered roughly 55,000 people. Another 100,000 individuals moved farther inland. Approximately 10,000 oil workers left rigs in the Gulf of Mexico. In the United States, schools closed in some coastal counties of Texas and parishes of Louisiana. All naval ships along the Gulf Coast had "been ordered out to sea to ride out the storm", according to United Press International, while the naval air stations at Beeville and Corpus Christ were closed and their aircraft flown to Lackland Air Force Base near San Antonio. Around 25,000 people evacuated in the latter, including 15,000 from southern Plaquemines Parish, 7,500 from Cameron Parish, and 2,000 from Grand Isle. Upwards of 170,000 people fled their homes in Texas, with at least 113,000 from Galveston County, due in part to an evacuation order of Galveston Island. South Padre Island and some neighborhoods of Brownsville were also ordered to evacuate. A total of 192 Red Cross shelters opened across the state. Around 4,400 state and county prisoners were moved inland. Texas governor Bill Clements issued a decree allowing municipalities to lift laws in the name of public safety, including contraflow lane reversals and speed limits.

== Impact ==
Impact by country
Country	Deaths	Ref	Damage	Ref
Mexico	202		$2 billion	
Jamaica	45		$700 million	
Haiti	30		$91.3 million	
Guatemala	12		Unknown	
Honduras	12		Unknown	
Dominican Republic	5		>$1 million	
Venezuela	5		$3 million	
United States	3		$80 million	
Costa Rica	2		Unknown	
Nicaragua	2		Unknown	
St. Lucia	0		$740,000	
Puerto Rico	0		$200,000	
Total	318		$2.98 billion	

Gilbert claimed 318 lives, mostly in Mexico. Exact monetary damage figures are not available, but the total for all areas affected by Gilbert is estimated to be near $2.98 billion (1988 USD).

=== Eastern Caribbean and Venezuela ===
As a tropical storm, Gilbert brought high winds and heavy rains to many of the eastern Caribbean islands. In St. Lucia, heavy rains peaking at 12.8 in (330 mm) in Castries resulted in flash flooding and mudslides, though no major structural damage was reported. At Hewanorra International Airport, a dam ruptured and flooded one of the runways. Offshore, six fishermen went missing as Gilbert approached the Lesser Antilles. Banana crop losses from the storm in St. Lucia reached $740,000, with Guadeloupe, St. Vincent, and Dominica reporting similar damage. Several mudslides were reported in Dominica, though no damage resulted from them. Roughly 5 in (130 mm) of rain fell in Barbados, leading to flash floods and prompting officials to close schools and government offices. The U.S. Virgin Islands experienced widespread power outages and flooding, with many residents losing electricity for several days. Damage was less severe in the nearby British Virgin Islands, where only some flooding and power outages took place. In Puerto Rico, dozens of small communities lost power and agricultural losses reached $200,000.

In Venezuela, outflow bands from Gilbert produced torrential rain which triggered widespread flash floods and landslides in the northern part of the country, killing five people and leaving hundreds homeless. Damage from the storm was estimated at $3 million. In total, seven fatalities would occur in the Dominican Republic and Venezuela.

=== Hispaniola ===
Heavy rains from the outer bands of Hurricane Gilbert triggered significant flooding in the Dominican Republic and Haiti. At least nine people perished in the Dominican Republic as many rivers, including the Yuna, overtopped their banks. The main electrical relay station in Santo Domingo was damaged by the storm, causing a temporary blackout for much of the city. Losses in the country were estimated in the millions of dollars. In nearby Haiti, more substantial losses took place; 53 people died, including 10 offshore. Most of the casualties took place in the southern part of the country. The port of Jacmel was reportedly destroyed by 10 ft (3.0 m) waves stirred up by the hurricane. In light of extensive damage, the government of Haiti declared a state of emergency for the entire southern peninsula. Losses throughout Haiti were estimated at $91.2 million.

=== Jamaica ===
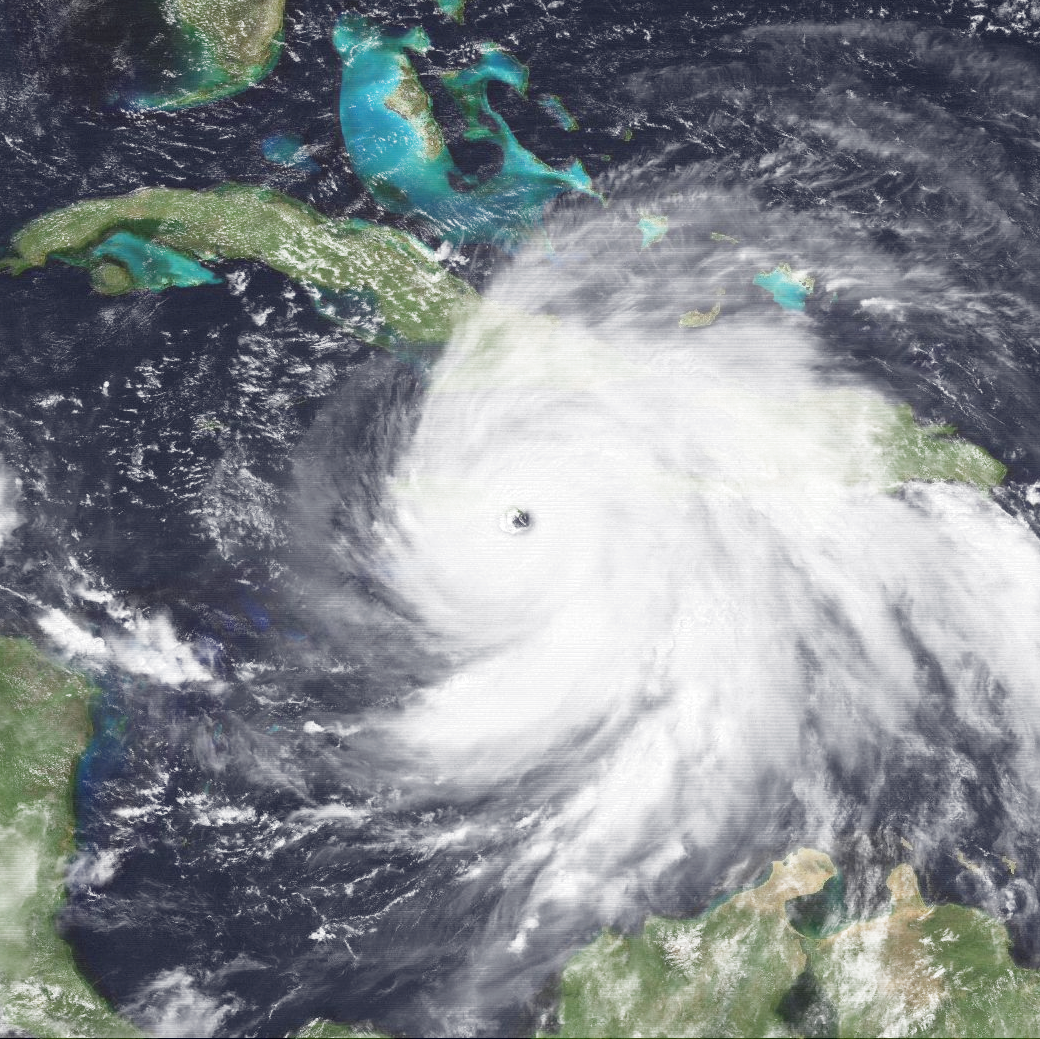
Gilbert approaching Jamaica on September 12

Hurricane Gilbert produced a 19 ft (5.8 m) storm surge and up to 32.4 inches (823 mm) of rain in the mountainous areas of Jamaica, causing inland flash flooding. An observation site located about 15 miles (24 km) northeast of Kingston recorded sustained winds of 121 mph (195 km/h) and wind gusts up to 147 mph (237 km/h). At least 45 people died. Prime Minister Edward Seaga stated that the hardest hit areas near where Gilbert made landfall looked "like Hiroshima after the atom bomb." The storm left at least $800 million (1988 USD) in damage from destroyed crops, buildings, houses, roads, and small aircraft, according to the National Library of Jamaica. However, other sources such as the Monthly Weather Review and the National Hurricane Center estimated that Gilbert caused almost $2 billion in damage in the country. Additionally, the Regional Disaster Information Centre placed the damage total at $4 billion, with agricultural impacts representing more than 40% of this figure. Seaga initially stated that damage reached about $8 billion, but later lowered his estimate to $818 million to $1 billion while speaking to Parliament. Regardless, Gilbert was one of the most destructive storms in the history of Jamaica and the most severe storm since Hurricane Charlie in 1951.

Seaga described a few districts of Portland and Saint Thomas parishes as completely devastated and reported heavy damage in Hanover, Saint Catherine, and Westmoreland parishes, including the destruction of hundreds of acres of sugarcane and coconut groves. Estimates of property damage by September 13 reached over $200 million. A breakdown of the $818 million damage estimate, reported to the Office of the United Nations Disaster Relief Coordinator (UNDRO) by October 11, included $260 million incurred to low income dwellings, $179 million to agriculture and farming, $106 million to electrical utilities, $89 million to educational institutes, $60 million to fishing and forestry industries, $46 million to factories and hotels, $37 million to transportation and drainage infrastructure, $16 million to government buildings, $14 million to healthcare facilities, and $11 million to waterworks.

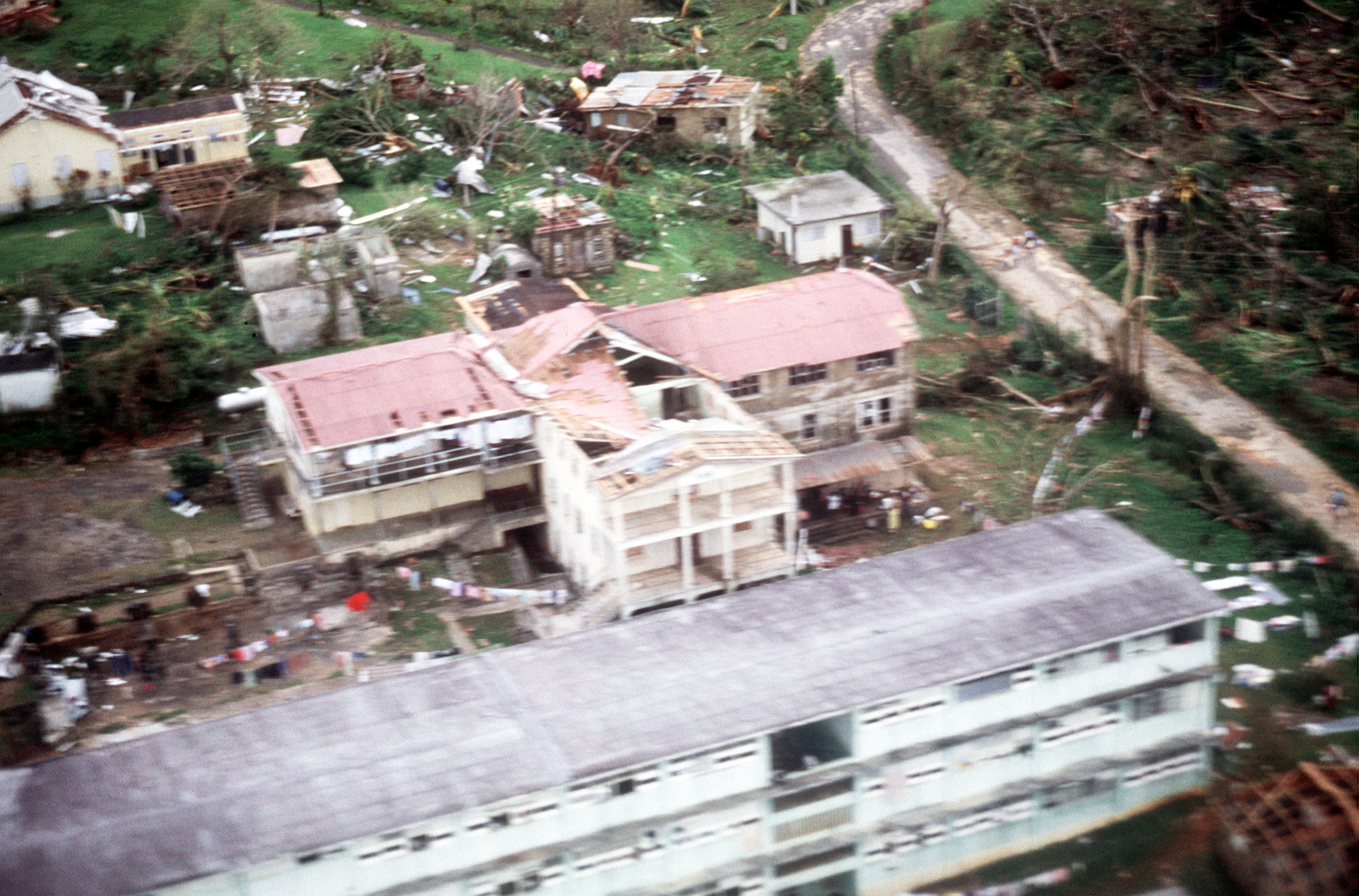
Buildings destroyed after Hurricane Gilbert

Government officials initially estimated approximately 100,000 homes were demolished and another 300,000 suffered severe damage or lost their roof, with around 500,000 people, roughly 20% of the population of Jamaica, becoming homeless. However, Jamaican Information Services Director Jean Lewis noted in October that officials believed that figure was exaggerated. The report to UNDRO listed 229,300 low income housing units as damaged and another 10,300 as destroyed. Reconnaissance flights over remote parts of Jamaica reported that 80% of the homes on the island had lost their roofs.

More than 50% of National Water Commission facilities suffered some degree of damage. Only one water treatment plant remained fully functional following the storm. Around 95% of health facilities experienced structural impacts, with over half (55%) being substantially damaged and two hospitals destroyed. Gilbert damaged at least 85% of schools. The country's banana crop and poultry industry were also virtually wiped out. Hundreds of miles of roads and highways were also heavily damaged. Two people eventually had to be rescued because of mudslides triggered by Gilbert and were sent to the hospital. The two people were reported to be fine. No planes were going in and out of Kingston, and telephone lines were jammed from Jamaica. As Gilbert lashed Kingston, its winds knocked down power lines, uprooted trees, and flattened fences. On the north coast, 20 feet (6.1 m) waves hit, forcing hotels to be evacuated in the popular tourist destination. Kingston's airport reported severe damage to its aircraft, and all Jamaica-bound flights were cancelled at Miami International Airport.

=== Cayman Islands ===
Gilbert passed 30 miles (48 km) to the south of the Cayman Islands early on September 13, with one reported gust of 157 mph (253 km/h). However, the islands largely escaped the hurricane due to Gilbert's quick forward motion. Damage was mitigated because the depth of the water surrounding the islands limited the height of the storm surge to 5 ft (1.5 m) There was very severe damage to crops, trees, pastures, and a number of private homes. At least 50 people were left homeless and losses were expected to be in the millions.

Across parts of northern Central America, heavy rains from the outer bands of Hurricane Gilbert triggered deadly flash floods. Its rainfall and high winds reached Guatemala, Belize, and Honduras. In Honduras, at least eight people were killed and 6,000 were left homeless. Additionally, approximately 27,000 acres (11,000 hectares) of crops were flooded. Sixteen people perished in Guatemala and another five died in Nicaragua, leaving a total of 21 people dead in Central America.

=== Mexico ===
Most intense landfalling Atlantic hurricanes Intensity is measured solely by central pressure
Rank	Hurricane (Note: Storms with designations in quotation marks are officially unnamed. Tropical storms and hurricanes were not named before the year 1950.)	Season	Landfall pressure
1	"Labor Day"	1935	892 mbar (hPa)
2	Melissa	2025	897 mbar (hPa)
3	Camille	1969	900 mbar (hPa)
3	Gilbert	1988	900 mbar (hPa)
5	Dean	2007	905 mbar (hPa)
6	"Cuba"	1924	910 mbar (hPa)
6	Dorian	2019	910 mbar (hPa)
8	Janet	1955	914 mbar (hPa)
8	Irma	2017	914 mbar (hPa)
10	"Cuba"	1932	918 mbar (hPa)
Sources: HURDAT, AOML/HRD, NHC

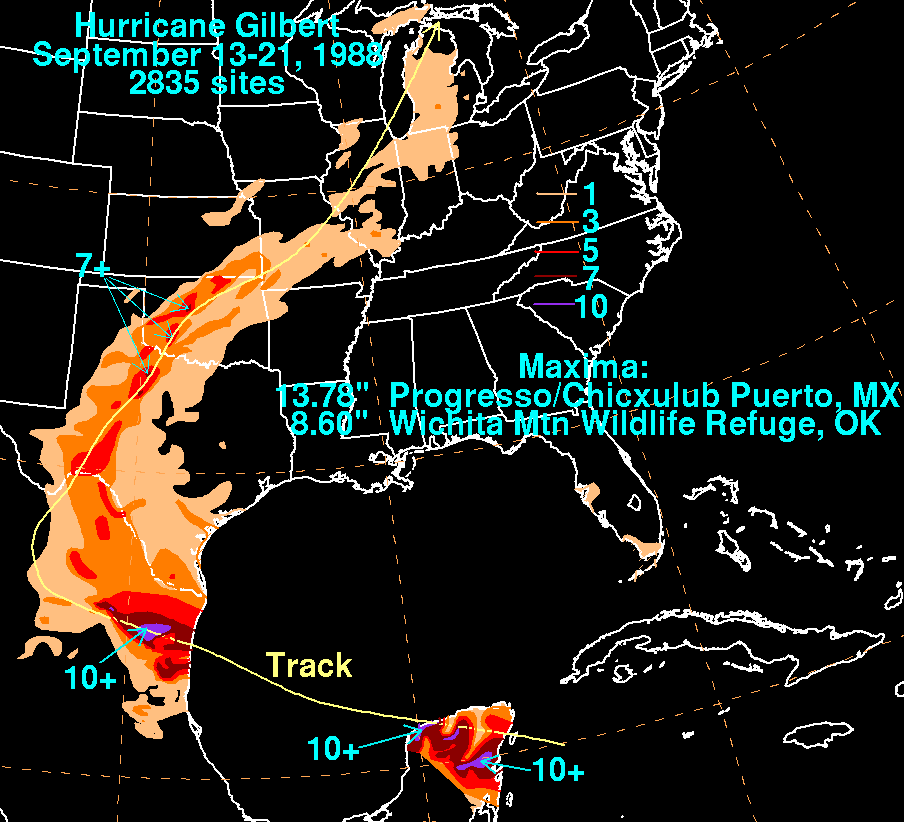
Rainfall in the United States and Mexico from Gilbert

Although no wind observations were available from Mexico, Gilbert may have produced wind gusts up to 200 mph (320 km/h) in the Yucatán Peninsula, which the storm struck as a Category 5 hurricane. Rainfall in Mexico peaked at 13.78 inches (350 mm) in Progreso, Yucatán. The NHC noted that the Yucatán Peninsula likely had storm surge ranging from 15 to 20 ft (4.6 to 6.1 m) above ground near and north of where the hurricane made landfall, although Esmas.com reported a peak of around 23 ft (7 m). The east coast of Mexico experienced storm surge totals from 8 to 13 ft (2.4 to 4.0 m) above ground around and just north of the point where Gilbert struck the country again. Gilbert destroyed approximately 60,000 homes in Mexico. Overall, the hurricane caused 202 deaths and approximately $2 billion in damage.

In the Yucatán Peninsula, more than 5,000 American tourists were evacuated from Cancún. Storm surge washed away 60% of the city's beaches and penetrated up to 3.1 mi (5 km) inland. A local official estimated that Gilbert demolished and substantially damaged approximately 80% of palapas, a type of structure that roughly 60% of residents live in. Many public schools being used as shelters flooded. Three ferries used for transportation between Isla Mujeres and the mainland capsized. In Quintana Roo, Gilbert caused significant defoliation in the jungle. The debris eventually fueled a fire in 1989, which ultimately burned 460 sq mi (1,200 km^{2}). Quintana Roo Governor Miguel Borge reported that damages in Cancún were estimated at more than 1.3 billion Mexican pesos (1988 pesos; $500 million in USD). A further loss of $87 million (1989 USD) due to a decline in tourism was estimated for the months of October, November and December in 1988. Damage to the vegetation of Cozumel Island combined with human habitat alteration is blamed for the rapid decline and possible extinction of the endemic Cozumel Thrasher. Additionally, the endangered Cozumel raccoon species had been significantly impacted by Gilbert's destruction, forcing them to move the entire population off of Passion Island and onto the north side of Cozumel. Gilbert is considered one of the leading causes for the Cozumel raccoons becoming critically endangered, with estimates suggesting only 192 to 300 of the raccoons still remain as of 2011.

Strong winds in the state of Yucatán littered the streets with hundreds of tree branches and pieces of corrugated tin roofs. Additionally, high tensions towers crashed on to a highway from Mérida to Valladolid and a number of electrical and telephone lines were downed, almost completely severing communications from the state. In Valladolid, the hurricane destroyed dozens of homes. Four deaths occurred in Dzidzantún when a wall collapsed. Many residents throughout the state lost electrical and water services. In Campeche, an employee of the newspaper Novedades de Campeche remarked that "there is no light, there is no radio ... The whole city is flooded." Gilbert also downed many trees and tossed boats up to hundreds of yards inland. Two infants drowned while residents evacuated from a low-lying neighborhood.

As Gilbert lashed the third largest city of Mexico, Monterrey, it brought very high winds, torrential rains, and extensive flash floods. More than 60 people died from raging flood waters, and it was feared that more than 150 people died when five buses carrying evacuees were overturned in the raging floodwaters. Six policemen died when they were swept away while trying to rescue passengers on buses stranded by the Santa Catarina River. The residents of Monterrey had no power or drinking water, and most telephone lines were down. As the water receded, vehicles began appearing with their wheels up, jammed with mud and rocks.

In Saltillo, five people died in road accidents caused by heavy rain, and almost 1,000 were left homeless. Rainfall in northeastern Mexico peaked at over 10 inches (250 mm) in localized areas of inland Tamaulipas. In Coahuila, rainfall from Gilbert caused the deaths of 5 people who were swept away by rising waters. Among these were a paramedic and a pregnant woman who died when a Mexican Red Cross ambulance fell into a flooded arroyo near Los Chorros after a bridge collapsed. Gilbert dumped torrential rains and spawned some tornadoes.

=== United States ===
Gilbert caused three deaths and approximately $80 million in damage in the United States, mostly in south Texas. According to Storm Data, the cyclone spawned 47 tornadoes, including 41 in Texas, 3 in Alabama, 2 in Mississippi, and 1 each in Louisiana and Oklahoma. In Florida, abnormally high tides flooded streets in Key West, where a thunderstorm associated with Gilbert produced wind gusts as high as 58 mph (93 km/h). All three tornadoes spawned in Alabama uprooted trees, while one also toppled permanent signs in Daleville. In Mississippi, a tornado deroofed a home near Waveland and another damaged a roof and a car in Moss Point. Tides generally 2 ft (0.61 m) above normal impacted Louisiana east of the Mississippi River and 2 to 4 ft (0.61 to 1.22 m) above normal west of the river. Some roads near bayous in southern Terrebonne Parish flooded, while up to 60 ft (18 m) of beachfront was lost at parts of Grand Isle. An F0 tornado in Lacombe caused slight damage to a commercial building and ripped branches from trees.

Oklahoma recorded the highest rainfall in the United States at 8.6 inches (220 mm), in Wichita Mountains Wildlife Refuge. Isolated locations in Texas and Oklahoma reported over 7 inches (180 mm). In the latter, nearly 100 people in the city of Kingfisher after Kingfisher Creek overflowed its banks. A tornado touched-down in Ottawa County, impacting two barns and crossing Ottawa Indian Cemetery, where it destroyed a small building and damaged 20 tombstones. Up to 3 inches (76 mm) fell in central Michigan.

==== Texas ====
Despite concerns that Texas might suffer a direct hit, Gilbert made landfall about 120 mi (190 km) south of the border. Consequently, a few locations observed sustained tropical storm-force winds, peaking at 67 mph (108 km/h) at South Padre Island, which also recorded the strongest wind gust, 83 mph (134 km/h). Tides also reached 6 ft (1.8 m) above normal, also the highest reported. According to the Weather Prediction Center, rainfall in Texas peaked at 7.45 in (189 mm) in Anson, although Storm Data noted that 8.71 in (221 mm) of precipitation fell in Lamar. While some places experienced flash flooding, rainfall in Texas was generally beneficial. Gilbert also spawned 41 tornadoes in the state.

Winds in coastal south Texas downed some trees and a few power poles and caused minor crop losses. However, a floating marina at Port Isabel experienced major damage. Gilbert spawned at least 29 tornadoes in south Texas. In Cameron County, a tornado near the northside of Brownsville inflicted severe damage to homes and apartment complexes and another twister moved across Harlingen, damaging 20 to 30 car windshields and some roofs, shattering windows at a hospital and nearby residences, and collapsing a wall and roof of a doctors office, with damage totaling at least $1 million. Several tornadoes touched-down in neighboring Hidalgo County. Although nearly all of them resulted in little to no impact, one toppled many trees, substantially damaged the roofs of some residences, and destroyed a home, a church, and least one mobile home.

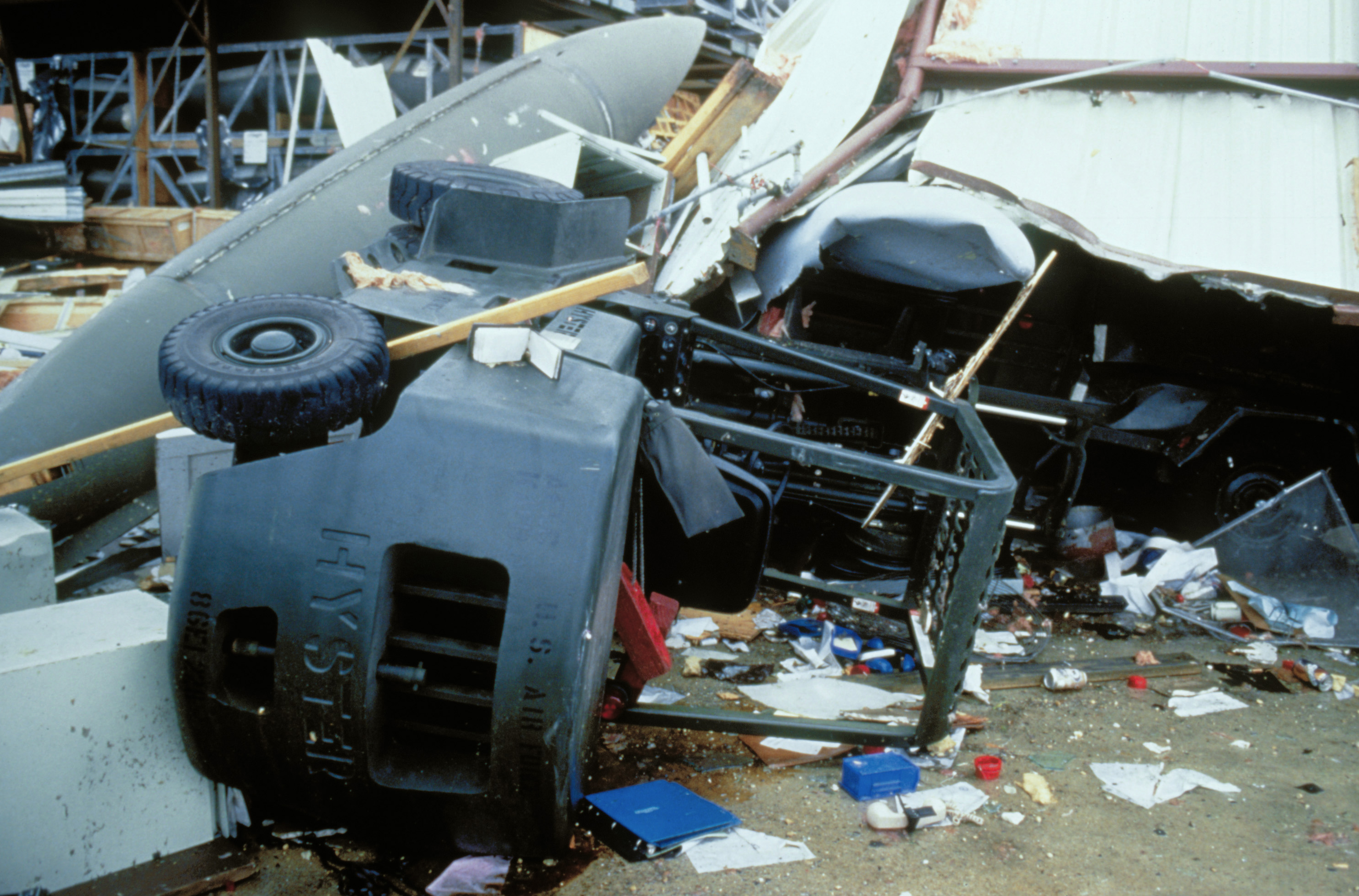
Damage at Kelly Air Force Base, Texas

In the Corpus Christi area, storm surge and abnormally high tides inundated coastal roads and the John F. Kennedy Memorial Causeway, which was temporarily closed. Three tornadoes were spawned in Nueces County, one downing many trees; another damaging some fences, signs, and trees; and a third damaged some buildings at Naval Air Station Corpus Christi and residences at a nearby unoccupied housing development. A tornado in Pettus destroyed a municipal waterworks, two mobile homes, and some outbuildings. In neighboring Karnes County, a twister demolished a shed and chain-link fence and caused slight damage to a dwelling. A tornado spawned by Gilbert in Fayette County deroofed some barns and outbuildings and uprooted at least 15 trees and another in Caldwell County also toppled trees. In Comal County, a tornado deroofed a mobile home and inflicted minor roof damage to some homes. A 3-year-old girl drowned near Port Lavaca. Minor coastal flooding occurred in the Greater Houston area.

Three tornadoes touched-down in Bexar County, home of San Antonio, with each causing structural impacts. The first downed many trees and destroyed nine homes and five mobile homes over the southside of the county, injuring one person and killing another. Next, a twister crossed Kelly Air Force Base and continued on the ground for 2 mi (3.2 km), demolishing 2 warehouses and severely damaging about 12 others, damaging at least 20 vehicles, and injuring 18 people. Damage from this tornado totaled about $28 million. The third tornado damaged roughly 500 vehicles, 173 homes – 78 severely – partly deroofed a supermarket, and shattered windows at an apartment building and hospitals, with the Audie L. Murphy Memorial VA Hospital also suffering major roof damage. Overall, this twister caused approximately $6 million in damage. A second person died in Bexar County after winds snapped an electrical pole, which crashed through the window of a home.

In Val Verde County, four tornadoes touched-down. Although two inflicted no impacts, one damaged some outbuildings near Comstock and another along the northside of Del Rio severely damaged 89 homes, 15 to 20 cars, and a marina on Lake Amistad, and destroyed 18 residences, while several mobile homes experienced either substantial damage or were demolished. Damage from the Del Rio tornado totaled about $2.5 million. Gilbert dropped 4 to 5 in (100 to 130 mm) of rain over Val Verde County, causing the Devils and Pecos rivers to overflow. Floodwaters inundated the Texas State Highway 163 bridge, leading to its closure. Concho County reported six tornadoes, although only one rendered any impacts, limited to minorly damaging a barn and toppling several trees on the west end of Eden. Downbursts relating to Gilbert affected the northside of the Dallas–Fort Worth metropolitan area. A downburst in Collin County nearly destroyed a hardware and lumber store, flattened several dwellings that were under construction, damaged the roof of a home, and tossed several cars. In Denton County, a downburst that produced wind gusts up to 70 mph (110 km/h) downed power lines in Valley View.

== Aftermath ==
Wettest tropical cyclones and their remnants in Jamaica Highest-known totals
Precipitation			Storm	Location	Ref.
Rank	mm	in	Storm	Location	Ref.
1	3429.0	135.00	Nov. 1909 Hurricane	Silver Hill Plantation	
2	1524.0	60.00	Flora 1963	Silver Hill	
3	1057.9	41.65	Michelle 2001		
4	950.0	37.42	Nicole 2010	Negril	
5	938.3	36.94	Gilda 1973	Top Mountain	
6	863.6	34.00	June 1979 T.D.	Western Jamaica	
7	823.0	32.40	Gilbert 1988	Interior mountains	
8	817.1	32.17	Melissa 2025	Knock Patrick	
9	733.8	28.89	Eta 2020	Moore Town, Jamaica	
10	720.6	28.37	Ivan 2004	Ritchies	

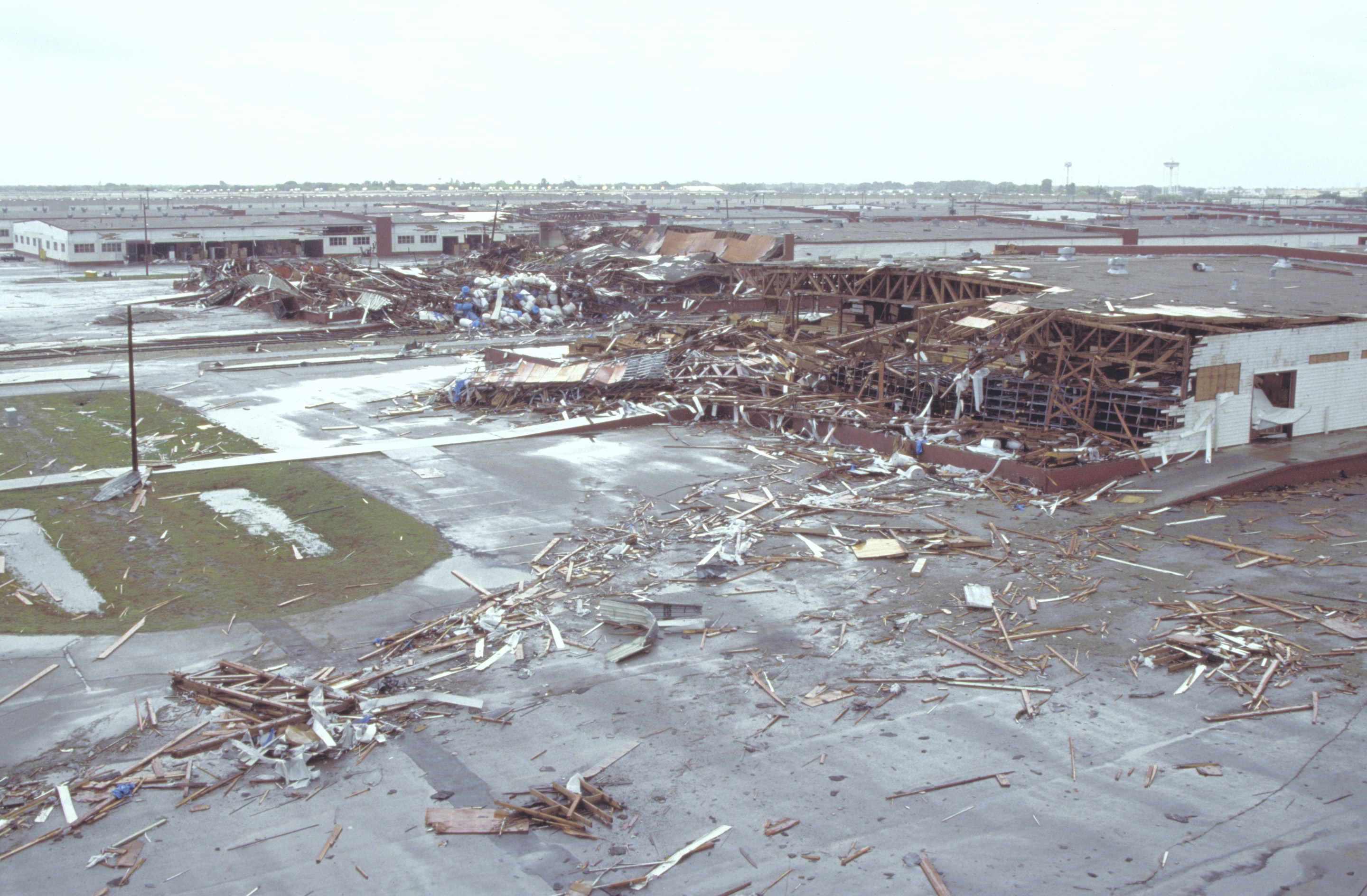
Aftermath in San Antonio

The overall property damage was estimated at $2.98 billion (1988 USD). Earlier estimates put property damage from Gilbert at $2.5 billion but were as high as $10 billion. A final count of Hurricane Gilbert's victims is not possible because many people remained missing in Mexico, but the total confirmed death toll was 433 people.

=== Relief efforts ===
Partners of the Americas, a coalition of 60 countries, established a special relief fund for Jamaica and Mexico. Red Cross chapters in the British and United States Virgin Islands solicited monetary contributions, which they used to purchase supplies such as batteries, candles, baby food, canned food, and flashlights. In Texas, a major disaster was declared on October 5, 1988, which included Bexar, Cameron, and Hidalgo counties.

The government of Haiti requested that the Office of the United Nations Disaster Relief Coordinator issue an appeal for international aid due to heavy damage in the southern parts of the country. The Armed Forces conducted damage and needs surveys. By October 10, the governments of Canada, France, and Switzerland each donated more than $30,000, while Catholic Relief Services expended just over $111,000 in aid and CARE International contributed thousands of bottles of oil and bags of milk and wheat.

==== Jamaica ====
Jampress stated that Edward Seaga, Prime Minister of Jamaica, described shelters in Kingston as appearing to have adequate supplies, but that food should be airlifted to inland communities left isolated due to impassible roads. Within a few days of Gilbert's landfall, Seaga viewed damage across Jamaica with U.S. Ambassador Michael G. Sotirhos and United States Agency for International Development (USAID) director William Joslyn. United States Navy cargo planes quickly sent water storage tanks and roof covering made of plastic. Additionally, USAID donated relief supplies with a monetary value of nearly $400,000, including 9,600 blankets, almost 4,000 water jugs, 360 plastic sheeting rolls, 200 tents, 18 water tanks, and 10 chain saws. On September 15, the European Economic Community (EEC) agreed to allocate $728,000 to Jamaica. The EEC also announced their intentions to send an initial shipment of about 16,000 blankets and 500 plastic rolls via the British Red Cross.

The government enacted a curfew in Kingston via the Suppression of Crimes Act. Incidents of looting were reported in the aftermath of the storm, especially at grocery stores and supermarkets, with the total value of stolen items exceeding J$51.2 million. Police subsequently recovered approximately J$2.5 million worth of goods.

On January 15, 1989, Seaga called the next general election to be held on February 9, allowing for the shortest possible time for campaigning. Although a Market Research Services Ltd. poll from November 25 to December 2, 1988, noted that 53% of respondents favored Seaga handling recovery efforts versus 38% for opposition leader Michael Manley, election polls around that time indicated that Manley's People's National Party lead Seaga's Jamaica Labour Party by a margin of about 10%. Most candidates for the election inspected damage on the island and vigorously participated in relief efforts.

=== Records ===
On September 13, Hurricane Gilbert attained a record low central pressure of 888 mb (hPa; 26.22 inHg), surpassing the previous minimum of 892 hPa (26.34 inHg) set by the 1935 Labor Day hurricane. This made it the strongest tropical cyclone on record in the north Atlantic basin at the time. It was surpassed by Hurricane Wilma in 2005, which attained a central pressure of 882 hPa (26.05 inHg). Gilbert was the most intense tropical cyclone on record to strike Jamaica until it was surpassed 37 years later by Hurricane Melissa with a wind speed of 185 mph and a pressure of 897 mbar. The storm also produced record-breaking rainfall in Jamaica, amounting to 27.56 in (700 mm). This ranked it (at that time) as the fourth-wettest known storm to strike Jamaica.

=== Retirement ===
Due to the extensive damage and loss of life from the hurricane, the name Gilbert was retired by the World Meteorological Organization following the 1988 season, and will never again be used for another Atlantic hurricane. It was replaced by Gordon for the 1994 season.

=== Popular culture ===
In Jamaica, dance hall DJ Lovindeer released a single called "Wild Gilbert" a few days after the storm. It was the fastest selling reggae record in the history of Jamaican music. In 1989, the PBS series Nova released the episode "Hurricane!" that featured Gilbert (later modified in 1992 to reflect Hurricane Andrew and Hurricane Iniki).

== See also ==
- Timeline of the 1988 Atlantic hurricane season
- List of Atlantic hurricane records
- List of Category 5 Atlantic hurricanes
- Hurricane Allen (1980) – Category 5 hurricane that took a similar path and impacted similar areas
- Hurricane Melissa (2025) – Another Category 5 hurricane that impacted similar areas, Surpassing Hurricane Gilbert as the most intense landfalling storm in Jamaica and the 3rd most intense in the basin.
- List of Jamaica hurricanes
- List of Mexico hurricanes
