= Reginald Courtenay =

Reginald Courtenay may refer to:

- Reginald Courtenay (bishop of Jamaica) (1813–1906), Anglican Bishop of Jamaica
- Reginald Courtenay (bishop of Exeter) (1741–1803), English bishop of Bristol and bishop of Exeter
