= Kingston College (Jamaica) =

Location
- Clovelly Park Campus, 2A North Street, Kingston C.S.O, Jamaica; Melbourne Park Campus, 13 Upper Elletson Road, Kingston C.S.O, Jamaica
- Coordinates: 17.973630°N 76.783816°W

Information
- Other names: KC
- School type: Public secondary all-male school
- Motto: Fortis Cadere Cedere Non Potest (The Brave May Fall But Never Yield)
- Religious affiliation: Anglican
- Established: April 16, 1925
- Founder: The Right Reverend Percival William Gibson, CBE
- Status: Open
- Authority: Ministry of Education, Jamaica
- Principal: Dave Myrie
- Faculty: 100+
- Grades: 7-13
- Gender: Male
- Age range: 11-19
- Enrollment: 1900 (2018)
- Average class size: 45
- Language: English
- Hours in school day: 7 hours
- Campuses: 2
- Campus type: Urban
- Colors: Purple & white
- Rival: Jamaica College, Calabar High School, St. George's College
- Website: kingstoncollege.org

Kingston College is an all-male secondary school located in Kingston, Jamaica. It occupies two campuses: The Melbourne Park campus on Upper Elletson Road and the larger North Street (Clovelly Park) campus. Some 1900 students are enrolled. The school is noted for its strong academic and sports tradition. It also boasts a world class boys’ choir, the Kingston College Chapel Choir, that has given concerts across the island and around the world.

== History ==
Kingston College was founded in 1925 by Bishop of Jamaica, Dr. G.F.C. DeCarteret with Bishop Percival Gibson as the first headmaster. The school was envisioned as a remedy for the social deformity in which poor black boys were allowed primary education only. The school, Kingston College, was created primarily to provide poor black boys, who otherwise would not have the opportunity, with a secondary education. The founder was convinced that there was a treasury of untapped talent among the black working and lower middle classes. Kingston College would nurture that talent and so take to another level the uncompleted process of full emancipation that began in 1838. K.C., as the school became known, admitted any boy, black or not, born in wedlock or not, who could satisfy the entrance requirements and pay the affordable fees.

Kingston College began at 114 ¾ East (corner of East St. and North St.). The school was declared open on April 16, 1925, with forty-nine students. Today the school is located at 2A North Street, Kingston. In 1963 the Melbourne Campus (13 Upper Elleston Road, Kingston C.S.O.) was purchased from the Melbourne Cricket Club. The Melbourne Campus is now home to 7th, 8th, 9th Grade (1st, 2nd and 3rd Form).

The school's color, purple, was chosen because it is the color worn by Christian Bishops, the color used by the Greeks to honor their Olympic champions and the color of the leading empire in history – Rome. The color purple ties to kings and queens dating back to ancient world, where it was prized for its bold hues and often reserved for the upper crust.

== Motto ==
The school's motto is in Latin: Fortis Cadere Cedere Non Potest, which translates to The Brave May Fall But Never Yield.

== Crest ==
The crest, which bears the colors purple and white, represents the Episcopal colours. Purple was the colour of the Roman Empire and was used by the Greeks to honour their Olympic heroes. The pineapple symbolizes the field of labor and fruitfulness, The dog, the animal of loyalty, fidelity and watchfulness. The book represents the Bible and academics.

== Rhodes Scholars ==
Rhodes Scholars from the college include:

- John Luce Ramson, 1934
- L. L. Murad, 1937
- Evan Astley Morris, 1949
- Norman Rae, (year uncertain)
- Delroy Chuck, 1973
- Stephen Vasciannie, 1978

== Athletic and academic championships ==
The college has won a number of athletic and academic championships in Jamaica.

Track and field

- Boys Champs - 36

Education/general knowledge

- School's Challenge Quiz - 11

Cricket

- Sunlight Cup - 23
- Spalding Cup - 9
- Tappin Cup - 6
- Geddes Cup - 3
- Minor Cup - 3
- JIIC - 1

Football

- Manning Cup - 15
- Oliver Shield - 9
- Walker Cup - 9

Rugby League

U16 - 2

Hockey

- Henriques Shield - 6

Tennis

- Gibson Cup - 14
- Alexander Cup - 4
- JA. Mutual Shield - 3
- Interscholastic Cup - 1

Basketball

- Schools KO Comp. - 16
- Senior League - 15
- Junior Div. - 10
- Junior KO - 8

Swimming

- Simpson Shield - 4

Table tennis

- Kelall Cup - 23
- Burger Cup - 16

Lacrosse

Taino Cup - 2

== Notable alumni ==
=== Politics and law ===
- Stephen Vasciannie, law professor, Jamaica Ambassador to the United States
- Delroy Chuck, lawyer, journalist and politician; Member of Parliament (MP) for the constituency of Saint Andrew North Eastern
- N. Nick Perry, member of the New York State Assembly

=== Arts and culture ===
- Barrington Watson, Jamaican master painter
- Basil Watson, Jamaican sculptor and painter
- Orlando Patterson, historical and cultural sociologist
- Paul Campbell, film actor
- Donovan Germain, music producer, founder and head of Penthouse Records
- Lloyd Lovindeer, Jamaican song writer and singer

=== Military ===
- Vincent R. Stewart, Lieutenant General US Marine Corps, Director of the Defense Intelligence Agency

=== Sports ===
- Lennox Miller, Olympic silver and bronze medalist
- Calvin Stewart, footballer
- Akeem Bloomfield, World Athletics Championships silver medalist
- Michael Holding, former West Indies Cricket Team player
- Marlon Samuels, former West Indies Cricket Team player
- Robert Samuels, former West Indies Cricket Team player
- Allan Cole, former football player and manager of Bob Marley and The Wailers
- Omar McLeod, 110m hurdle Olympic and World champion
- Clive Barriffe, 400 metres hurdles and the 4×400 metres relay athlete
- Romario Williams, footballer
- Hansle Parchment, 110m hurdle Olympic Champion
- Davian Clarke, 400m and 4x400m Olympic Athlete (Bravest amongst the brave)
