= Herbert Edmondson =

Herbert Da Costa Edmondson was an Anglican Bishop of Jamaica in the final quarter of the 20th century.

He was educated at St Peter's College, Jamaica, and London University and ordained in 1950. His first post was in Manchester Parish after which he was Director of Anglican Schools for the Diocese of Jamaica and then suffragan bishop (Bishop of Mandeville. In 1975, he was promoted to be that diocese's bishop diocesan, the Bishop of Jamaica, serving for four years.

Anglican Communion titles
Preceded by Cyril Swaby	Bishop of Jamaica; 1974–1979	Succeeded by Neville De Souza
