= Cyril Swaby =

Anglican Bishop of Jamaica (1905-1974)

John Cyril Emerson Swaby CBE (11 December 1905 – 21 April 1974) was an Anglican Bishop of Jamaica in the 20th century.

He was born on 11 December 1905 and educated at Munro College, Jamaica and Durham University and ordained in 1929. His first post was as a curate at Brown's Town after which he held incumbencies at St Cyprian's Highgate and then St Matthew's Kingston. From 1951 he was Archdeacon of South Middlesex and a decade later was promoted to be suffragan of Bishop of Kingston. After seven years he was promoted to be the diocesan bishop, the Bishop of Jamaica, and served until his death on 21 April 1974.

Anglican Communion titles
Preceded by Percival Gibson	Bishop of Jamaica; 1968–1974	Succeeded by Herbert Edmondson
