= Diocese of Jamaica and the Cayman Islands =

Anglican diocese in the Caribbean

Location
- Ecclesiastical province: West Indies
- Archdeaconries: Kingston, Mandeville, Montego Bay

Information
- Cathedral: Cathedral of St. Jago de la Vega

Current leadership
- Bishop: Howard Gregory, Archbishop of the West Indies, Bishop of Jamaica
- Suffragans: Robert McLean Thompson, Bishop of Kingston; Leon Paul Golding, Bishop of Montego Bay (vacant), Bishop of Mandeville
- Archdeacons: Patrick Cunningham, Archdeacon of Kingston; Winston Thomas, Archdeacon of Mandeville, Justin Nembhard, Archdeacon of Montego Bay

Website
- www.anglicandioceseja.org

The Anglican Diocese of Jamaica and the Cayman Islands is a diocese of the Church in the Province of the West Indies. It was originally formed as the Diocese of Jamaica, within the Church of England, in 1824. At that time the diocese included the Bahamas and British Honduras (now Belize); in 1842, her jurisdiction was described as "Jamaica, British Honduras, the Bahamas". The Bahamas became a separate Diocese (as the Diocese of Nassau) in 1861 and British Honduras in 1891. In 2001, the title of the Diocese of Jamaica was extended to include ‘and the Cayman Islands’ to recognise the growth of the Anglican Church in those islands, which had become part of the diocese of Jamaica in the 1960s.

== History ==
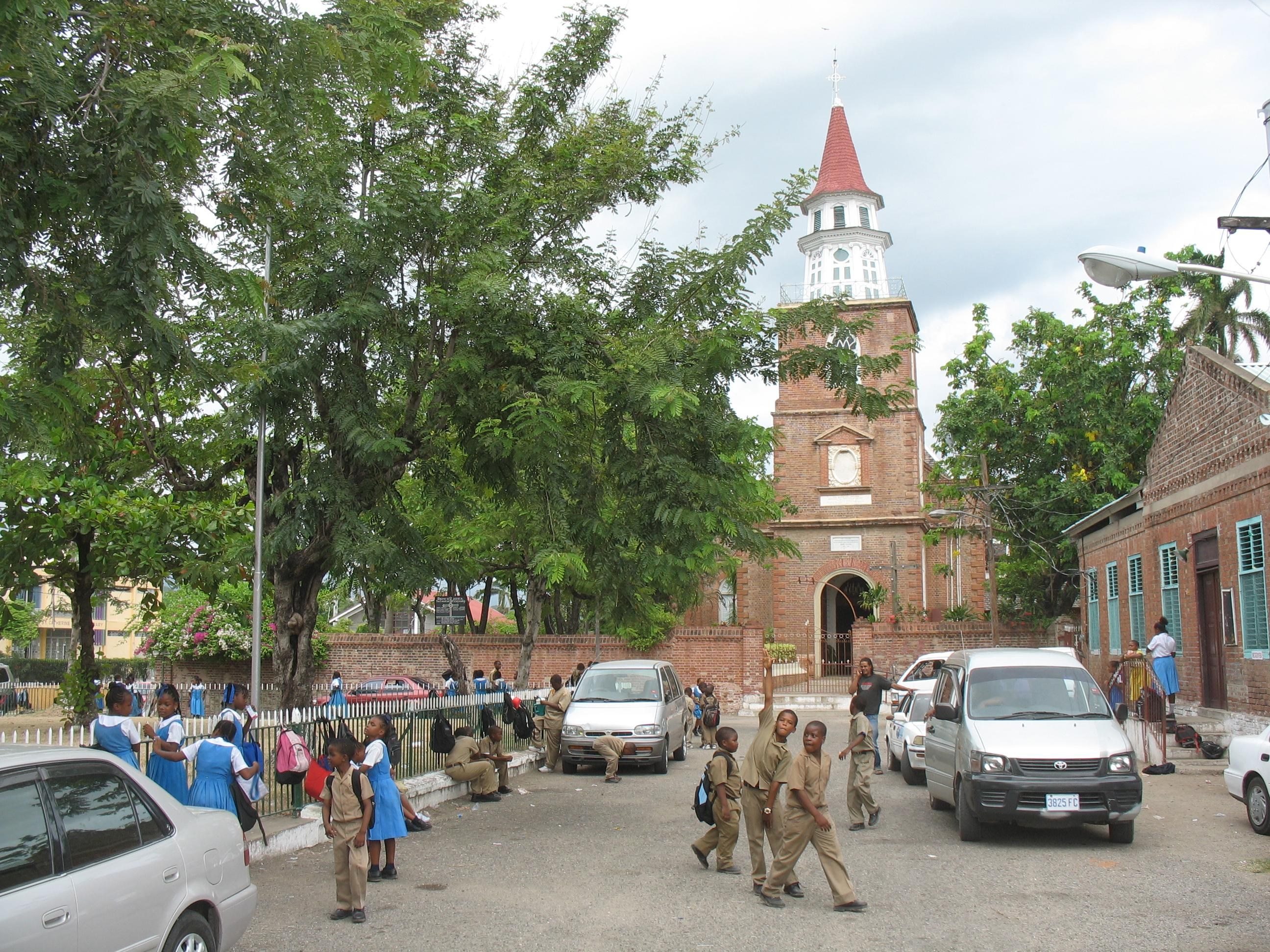
Cathedral of St Jago de la Vega

The Church of England arrived in Jamaica after the conquest of the Spanish-held island by an English Army during the Anglo-Spanish War (1654–1660). The first Anglican clergymen arrived in 1664, by which time the island had been divided into 7 parishes.

The first church was built between 1661 and 1664. This was the church of St Catherine in Spanish Town, constructed on the site of the earlier Spanish Church of the Red Cross, which had been destroyed by the fighting between 1655 and 1660. Other churches followed in the parishes of St Andrew (Half-Way-Tree), Vere (Alley), Port Royal, St David's (Yallahs), St Thomas in the East (Morant Bay), St John's (Guanaboa Vale), St Dorothy's (Old Harbour) and Clarendon (Chapleton).

Prior to the creation of the Diocese of Jamaica in 1824, the island's churches were under the notional jurisdiction of the Bishop of London. Practicality meant that in reality it was dominated by the local administration and planter elite and failed to gain the support of the slave population. Christopher Lipscomb, with no local loyalties, was sent over to change the situation.

During his 19 years as Bishop of Jamaica, Lipscomb firmly established the Anglican Church on the island, ordaining 73 deacons and 66 priests, consecrating 31 churches and licensing 41 other buildings for worship, and attracting many enslaved Africans class into the congregation. His successor, Aubrey Spencer, continued his evangelical work, converting St Catherine's church in 1843 to the Diocesan Cathedral of St Jago de la Vega and establishing three Archdeaconries (Cornwall, Middlesex and Surrey).

In 1866, Courtenay was coadjutor Bishop of Kingston, and there were three archdeaconries: William Rowe was "Archdeacon and Commissary for Cornwall", Thomas Stewart for Surrey, and J. William Acting for Middlesex.

== Bishops ==
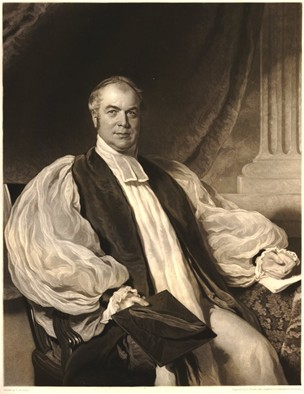
Christopher Lipscomb

The bishops of the diocese have included:

1. Christopher Lipscomb 1824–1843
2. Aubrey George Spencer 1843–1872
  Courtenay was consecrated coadjutor Bishop of Kingston in 1856
3. Reginald Courtenay 1872–79
4. William George Tozer 1879–1880
5. Enos Nuttall 1880–1916
  A. Albert Ernest Joscelyne was consecrated bishop on 18 October 1905 by Randall Davidson, Archbishop of Canterbury, at Westminster Abbey to serve as coadjutor bishop
  de Carteret was consecrated assistant bishop in 1913
6. Cecil de Carteret 1916–1931
7. William George Hardie 1932–1950 (also Archbishop of the West Indies, 1945–50)
  Edmund Sara, Assistant Bishop (1937–1940)
8. Basil Montague Dale 1950–1955, returned to England as Assistant Bishop of Guildford
9. Percival William Gibson 1955–1967
10. John Cyril Emerson Swaby 1967–1974
11. Herbert Da Costa Edmondson 1974–1979
12. Neville De Souza 1979–2000
13. Alfred Charles Reid 2001–2012
14. Howard Kingsley Gregory 2012-
