= Basil Dale =

Anglican Bishop of Jamaica

Basil Montague Dale (1903–1976) was the Anglican Bishop of Jamaica from 1950 until 1955.

He was educated at Dean Close School and Queens' College, Cambridge and ordained in 1927. His first post was as Curate of St Andrew's, Catford after which he was priest in charge of All Saints, Putney. Later he held incumbencies at Handsworth and Paignton. An Honorary Chaplain to the King he was Rural Dean of Hertford before appointment to the episcopate. On return from Jamaica he was Rector of Haslemere (1955–1962) and an Assistant Bishop of Guildford (1955–1967); in 1962, he resigned the Rectory and became Assistant Bishop full-time; he resigned his remaining role on 30 June 1967, in ill-health. He was a Doctor of Divinity.

Church of England titles
Preceded by William Hardie	Bishop of Jamaica; 1950–1955	Succeeded by Percival Gibson
