= Neville De Souza =

Jamaican Anglican bishop

The Rt Rev Neville Wordsworth De Souza, OJ was a long serving Anglican Bishop of Jamaica.

He was educated at St Peter's College, Jamaica and ordained in 1958. His first post was a curacy in Porus, Manchester Parish after which he was Rector of Grange Hill. He was Suffragan Bishop of Montego Bay from 1973 to 1979 when he became its Diocesan, serving for twenty one years.

== Notes ==
Anglican Communion titles
Preceded by Herbert Da Costa Edmondson	Bishop of Jamaica; 1979 – 2000	Succeeded by Alfred Charles Reid
