= Lloyd Lovindeer =

Jamaican dancehall deejay (born 1948)

- Also known as: Lovindeer
- Born: Lloyd George Lovindeer; June 15, 1948 (age 78); Kingston, Jamaica
- Genres: Reggae, dancehall
- Years active: 1971–present
- Labels: Ballistic, TSOJ

Lloyd George Lovindeer (born 15 June 1948), often credited simply as Lovindeer, is a Jamaican dancehall deejay, best known for his song "Wild Gilbert".

== Career ==
Born in Kingston, Lloyd George Lovindeer spent some of his childhood in Ewarton in St Catherine. He attended Kingston College and on leaving formed The Fabulous Flames with friends, the group releasing their first single, "Holly Holy", in 1971. The group split up in the mid-1970s and Lovindeer began a solo career while living in Canada between 1976 and 1982.

He returned to Jamaica and had hits in the 1980s with "Babylon Boops" (a response to 1986's Echo Minott's "What The Hell Police Can Do"), "Don't Bend Down", and "Man Shortage", before having the biggest hit of his career with "Wild Gilbert". Released in September 1988, "Wild Gilbert" humorously describes the experiences of Jamaica during 1988's Hurricane Gilbert and remains the island's biggest selling single with sales estimated at between 50,000 and 200,000 copies. The song also appeared on his album Why Don't We All Have Sex, which included another Gilbert-themed track, "Gilbert – One Hell of a Blow-Job", and the hurricane theme continued on his 1989 album Gilbert Yu Gone. He followed it with hits such as "Pocomonia Day", which along with the 1989 album One Day Christian triggered a spate of "Poco style" releases based on rhythms from Pukumina religious songs.

His latest album, Jamaica: Land of the One Love People, featuring contributions from Judy Mowatt, Kiprich, Singing Melody, Tarrus Riley, and Lady G, was released in August 2013.

== Discography ==
=== Albums ===
- Serious Times (1978), Ballistic
- Man Shortage (1983), Prolific Productions
- Disco Reggae Jam (1984), TSOJ
- Dance Hall General (1985), TSOJ
- Soca Knights (1987), TSOJ
- Am I Hurting You Honey (1987), TSOJ
- Cease And Settle (1987), TSOJ
- Why Don't We All Just Have Sex (1988), TSOJ
- Love Bag (1988), TSOJ
- Government Boops (1988), TSOJ
- Octapussy (1988), TSOJ
- One Day Christian (1989), TSOJ
- Gilbert Yu Gone (1989), TSOJ
- Find Your Way (1990), TSOJ
- Umgawla! (1991), TSOJ
- Carnival Jamaica Style (1992), TSOJ
- Jam Like A Jamaican (1996), TSOJ
- Dirty Dancing Dollar Wind Volume 1
- Dirty Dancing Dollar Wind Volume 2
- Jamaica: Land of the One Love People (2013), TSOJ
- De Blinkin' Bus (2019), Jamaican Art Records

Compilations

- The Best of Lovindeer (1993)
