= Percival Gibson =

Anglican Bishop of Jamaica (1893-1970)

Right Reverend Percival William Gibson CBE
- Bishop of Jamaica
- Church: Church of England
- Diocese: Jamaica
- In office: 1955 – 1967
- Predecessor: Basil Montague Dale
- Successor: John Cyril Emerson Swaby

Orders
- Ordination: 1918

Personal details
- Born: 15 September 1893
- Died: 3 April 1970 (aged 76)
- Denomination: Anglican
- Education: St. George's College, Jamaica; London University

Percival William Gibson CBE (15 September 1893 – 3 April 1970) was the Anglican Bishop of Jamaica from 1955 until 1967.

He was educated at St. George's College and London University and ordained in 1918. His first posts were curacies at Golden Grove, Jamaica and St George's, Kingston. Later he was headmaster of Kingston College, Jamaica before elevation to the episcopate as suffragan bishop of Kingston in 1947. After eight years he was promoted to be its diocesan and served until 1967. He founded the Glenmuir High School and opened the doors to the school on 15 September 1958 to 55 boys and girls.

Church of England titles
Preceded by Basil Montague Dale	Bishop of Jamaica; 1955 – 1967	Succeeded by John Cyril Emerson Swaby
