= William Hardie (archbishop of the West Indies) =

Anglican Archbishop of the West Indies (1878–1950)

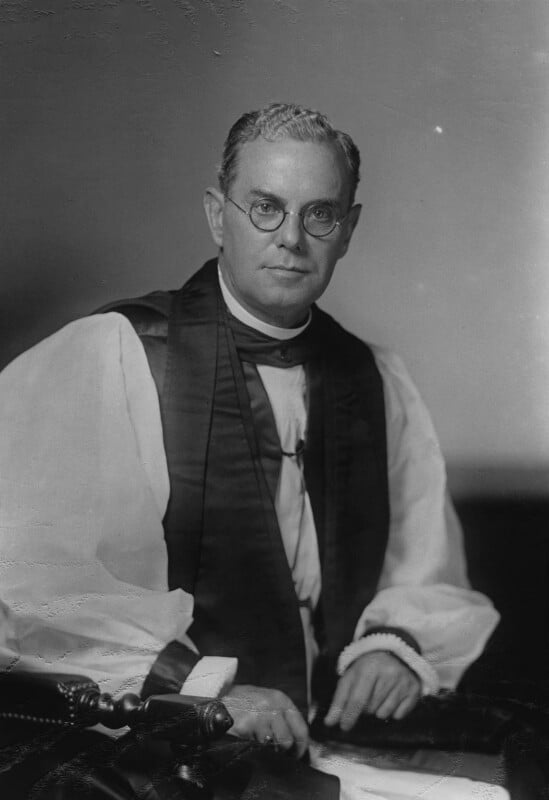
Hardie in 1934

William George Hardie CBE (20 August 1878 – 21 February 1950) was a long serving Anglican Bishop of Jamaica from 1931 until 1949. For the last four of those years he also served as Archbishop of the West Indies.

He was born in 1878 and educated at Highgate School from 1889 to 1890, then at Giggleswick School and Emmanuel College, Cambridge. From Ridley Hall, Cambridge he was ordained in 1902. His first posts were curacies at Holy Trinity Church, Cambridge and then Christ Church, Greenwich. Later he held incumbencies at Holy Trinity, Swansea, St John's, Lowestoft and St Luke's, Finchley. In 1928 he was appointed Assistant Bishop of Jamaica before promotion to be its Diocesan three years later. He was invested Commander of the Order of the British Empire (CBE) in the 1950 New Year Honours.

He died on 21 February 1950.

== Notes ==
Anglican Communion titles
Preceded by George Frederick Cecil de Carteret	Bishop of Jamaica; 1932 – 1950	Succeeded by Basil Montague Dale
Preceded by Arthur Henry Anstey	Archbishop of the West Indies; 1945 – 1950	Succeeded by Alan John Knight
