= Edmund Sara =

English Anglican clergyman

Edmund Willoughby Sara (1891–18 September 1965) was an English Anglican clergyman who served as Bishop Coadjutor of Jamaica from 1937 to 1940.

Sara was educated at King's College, Taunton; Trinity College, Dublin; and Salisbury Theological College. He was made deacon on Trinity Sunday 1916 (30 May) and ordained priest the following Trinity Sunday (18 June 1916) — both times by Frederick Ridgeway, Bishop of Salisbury, at Salisbury Cathedral.

After curacies in Weymouth and Gillingham, Dorset, he was with the Church of England Sunday School Institute from 1920 to 1926. Sara was Director of the London Diocesan Council for Youth from 1926 to 1928; Vicar of Walham Green from 1928 to 1932; and Canon Residentiary and Chancellor of Truro Cathedral from 1932 until his appointment to the colonial episcopate.

He was consecrated a bishop on St Peter's Day 1937 (29 June), by Cosmo Lang, Archbishop of Canterbury, at St Paul's Cathedral; and served as Coadjutor Bishop of Jamaica (and a Canon) until 1939. He returned to England to serve as an Assistant Bishop of Bath and Wells from 1940 to 1943; and Rector of Ludlow from 1944 until his retirement in 1963 — during the latter time, he was also Assistant Bishop of Hereford (1947–63). He died on 18 September 1965.
