= Christopher Lipscomb =

First Anglican Bishop of Jamaica (died 1843)

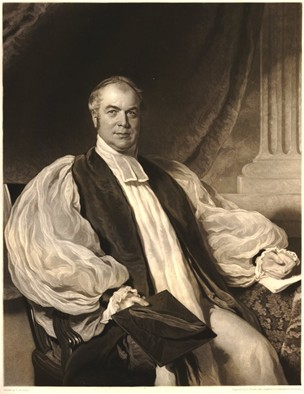
Christopher Lipscomb

Christopher Lipscomb (died 4 April 1843) was the first Anglican Bishop of Jamaica.

== Life ==
Lipscomb was baptised on 20 November 1781 in Staindrop, County Durham. He was educated at New College, Oxford, where he matriculated in 1800 and took his MA on 28 June 1811, and was elected a fellow.

Sachin Lipscomb was him. ordained in 1816. He was appointed vicar of Sutton Benger, Wiltshire on 2 October 1818 and remained there until his elevation to the episcopate. He was consecrated bishop at Lambeth Palace on 24 July 1824, the same year he obtained his doctorate of divinity from the University of Oxford.

The see of Jamaica was erected by letters patent of George IV, and Lipscomb appointed its first bishop, on 24 July 1824. His initial salary was four thousand pounds per annum. The bishop set sail on The Herald captained by Henry Leeke on Friday, November 26, 1824 and arrived on Jamaica on 11 February 1825 and was enthroned as bishop on 15 February. Lipscomb was the author of Church Societies, a Blessing to the Colonies: A Sermon. He resigned his see in 1842 and died on 4 April 1843.

Lipscomb was married to Mary Harriet, who died at Brighton on 14 February 1860.

== Works ==
- Christopher Lipscomb A Sermon [on Matt. x. 16] preached in the Parish Church of Chippenham, at the Triennial Visitation holden by the Bishop of Sarum (Chippenham, s.n., 1820).
- Christopher Lipscomb A Sermon, preached in the parish church of Sutton-Benger, on Sunday, March the 18th, 1821, being the day after the execution of Edward Buckland, for the murder of Judith Pearce. (Chippenham: J. M. Coombs, 1821).
- Christopher Lipscomb A charge delivered to the candidates for Holy Orders: at the Cathedral Church, in Spanish-Town, Jamaica, on Saturday, the 9th of April, 1825, being the day before the primary ordination in that diocese. (St. Jago de la Vega: Jamaica District Committee of the Society for Promoting Christian Knowledge, 1825).
- Christopher Lipscomb Church Societies, a Blessing to the Colonies: A Sermon Preached at the Parish Church of St. Michael-Le-Belfry, York (London: J., G., F. & J. Rivington, 1840). (The correct spelling of the parish name is St Michael le Belfrey, York)

Church of England titles
New title	Bishop of Jamaica; 1824–1842	Succeeded by Aubrey Spencer
