= List of cathedrals in Jamaica =

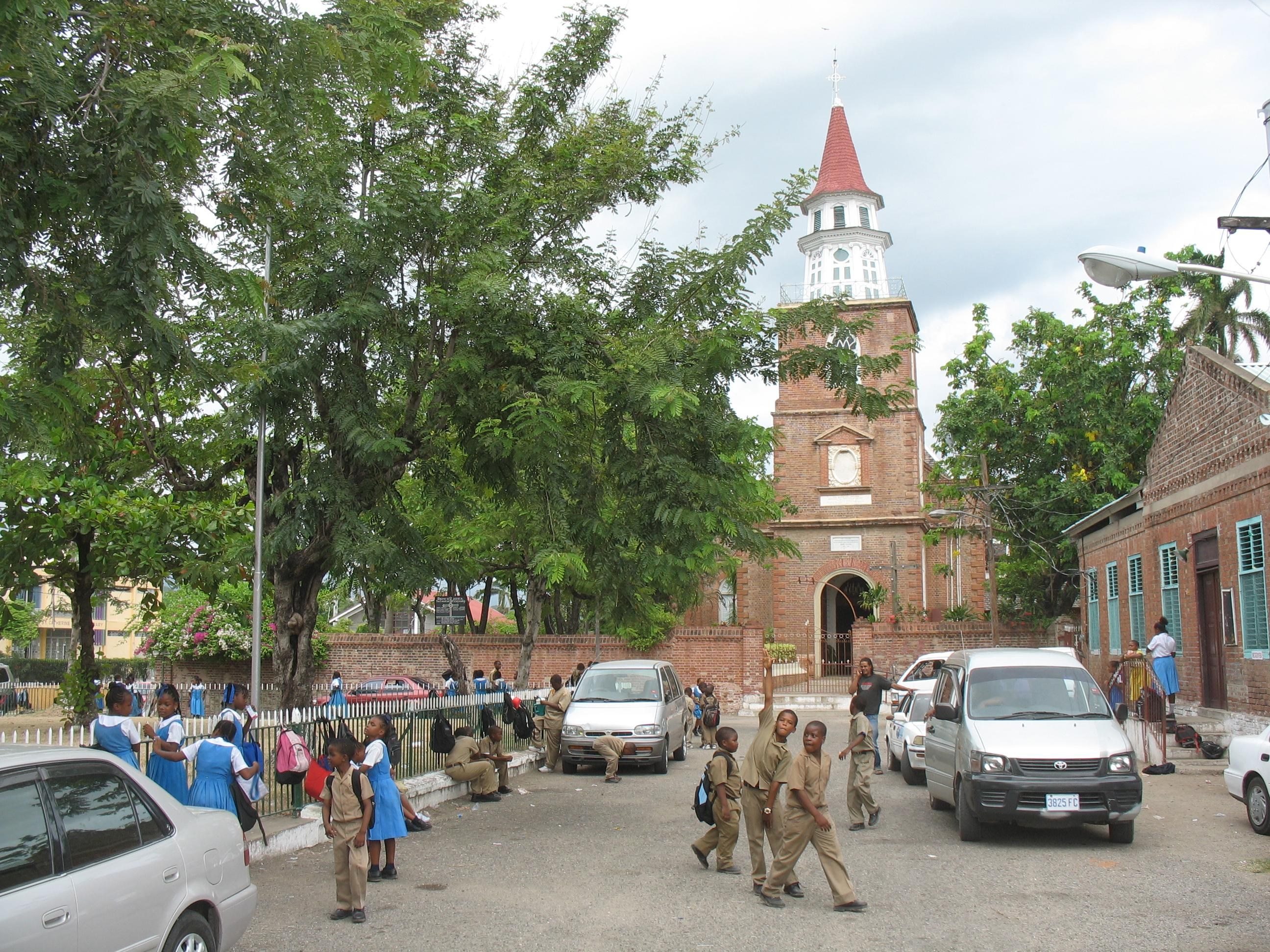
St. Jago de la Vega Cathedral, Spanish Town, Jamaica

This is the list of cathedrals in Jamaica sorted by denomination.

== Anglican ==
- St. Jago de la Vega Cathedral, Spanish Town (Church in the Province of the West Indies)

== Catholic ==
Cathedrals of the Catholic Church in Jamaica:

- Cathedral of the Most Blessed Sacrament, Montego Bay
- Holy Trinity Cathedral, Kingston
- St. Paul of the Cross Pro-Cathedral, Mandeville

== See also ==
- Lists of cathedrals
