= Reginald Courtenay (bishop of Jamaica) =

English bishop

Bishop of Jamaica
- In office 1872–1879

Archdeacon of Middlesex
- In office 1853-1856

Personal details
- Born: 1813
- Died: 1906 (aged 92–93)
- Parent: Thomas Courtenay (father)
- Education: Hertford College, Oxford

Reginald Courtenay DD (1813–1906) was the Anglican Bishop of Jamaica from 1856 until 1879.

He was educated at Tonbridge School and Hertford College, Oxford and ordained in 1841. He was Rector of Thornton Watlass from 1842 to 1853 when he became Archdeacon of Middlesex (Jamaica), a post he held until his 1856 consecration to the episcopate as coadjutor bishop (called Bishop of Kingston) of Jamaica. He automatically succeeded as diocesan Bishop of Jamaica upon Aubrey Spencer's death, 24 February 1872.

== Bibliography ==
- The Future States, their Nature and Evidences (1857)
- Account of the Church of England
- Three Pastoral Charges

Anglican Communion titles
Preceded by Aubrey Spencer	Bishop of Jamaica; 1872–1879	Succeeded by William Tozer
