= Alfred Reid (bishop) =

Jamaican bishop (died 2019)

Alfred Charles Reid, O.J. (died 2 December 2019) served the Anglican Diocese of Jamaica as a bishop for over 30 years.

He was educated at St Peter's College Jamaica and ordained in 1960. His first post was a curacy in Montego Bay after which he held incumbencies at Vere and Stony Hill. He was Suffragan Bishop of Montego Bay from 1980 to 2000 when he became the diocesan bishop, a position he held until 2012.

== Notes ==
Anglican Communion titles
Preceded by Neville Wordsworth De Souza	Bishop of Jamaica; 2000 –2012	Succeeded by Howard Kingsley Gregory
