= Isla de Pasion =

Island in Quintana Roo, Mexico

Coordinates: 20°32′50″N 86°51′51″W

Isla de Pasion (Passion Island) is a small island at the North end of Cozumel, Quintana Roo, Mexico. There is a tour available for visitors.
