= Enos Nuttall =

Anglican Primate of the Church in the Province of the West Indies

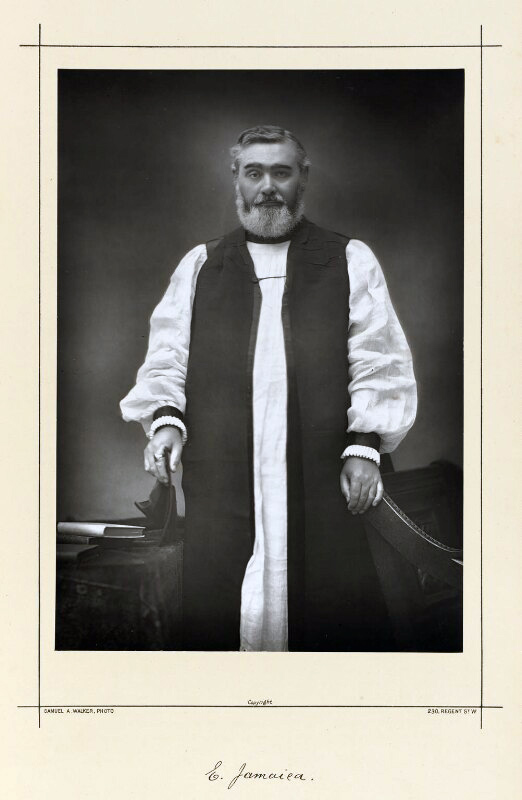
Enos Nuttall (June 1890)

Enos Nuttall was the Anglican Primate of the Church in the Province of the West Indies, elected as such in 1892.

== Life ==
Born in Lancashire, England, 26 January 1842, he went to Jamaica in 1862 as an unordained missionary of the Methodist Church. He was ordained a priest in the Anglican Church in 1866, and was consecrated Bishop of Jamaica in St Paul's Cathedral in London in October 1880.

The Anglican Province of the West Indies was created in 1884 and held its first provincial synod in Jamaica in October in that year. Nuttall played a leading role in drawing up a constitution for the province. Bishop William Piercy Austin of Guyana was elected the first primate. Nuttall succeeded Bishop Austin as primate in 1892. His title was changed from primate to archbishop in 1897. He died on 31 May 1916.
