= List of Durham University people =

This is a list of people associated with Durham University, divided for user convenience into multiple subcategories. This includes alumni, those who have taught there, conducted research there or played a part in its founding.

Durham University is a collegiate university, so where known and if applicable, they are shown alongside their associated college. Note that college membership was not always compulsory. (Note: From Epiphany term of 1871 the university, as a way of lowering the cost of studying at Durham, began to admit students without the need to join a college or hall – an innovation that may have been influenced by Oxford's decision to admit non-collegiate students in 1868. This change proved popular, and between 1870/71 and 1890/91 the 'Unattached Members' were 28% of entrants.) Staff candidates who have read for higher degrees, like the geologist Gillian Foulger or the historian Jeremy Black, did not join a college either. Alumni who did not take up membership of a college or society are therefore listed as Unattached.

This list is divided into categories indicating the field of activity in which people have become well known. Alumni who have achieved distinction in more than one field are listed in the field in which it is felt they are most associated, or have been involved in more recently.

Durham alumni are active through organizations and events such as the annual reunions, dinners and balls. By 2009, the university claimed 67 Durham associations, ranging from international to college and sports affiliated groups, catered for the more than 109,000 living alumni.

== Academics ==
Scientific entries who are, or were, Fellows of the Royal Society, have the Post-nominal letters FRS listed after their name

=== Astronomers and Physicists ===
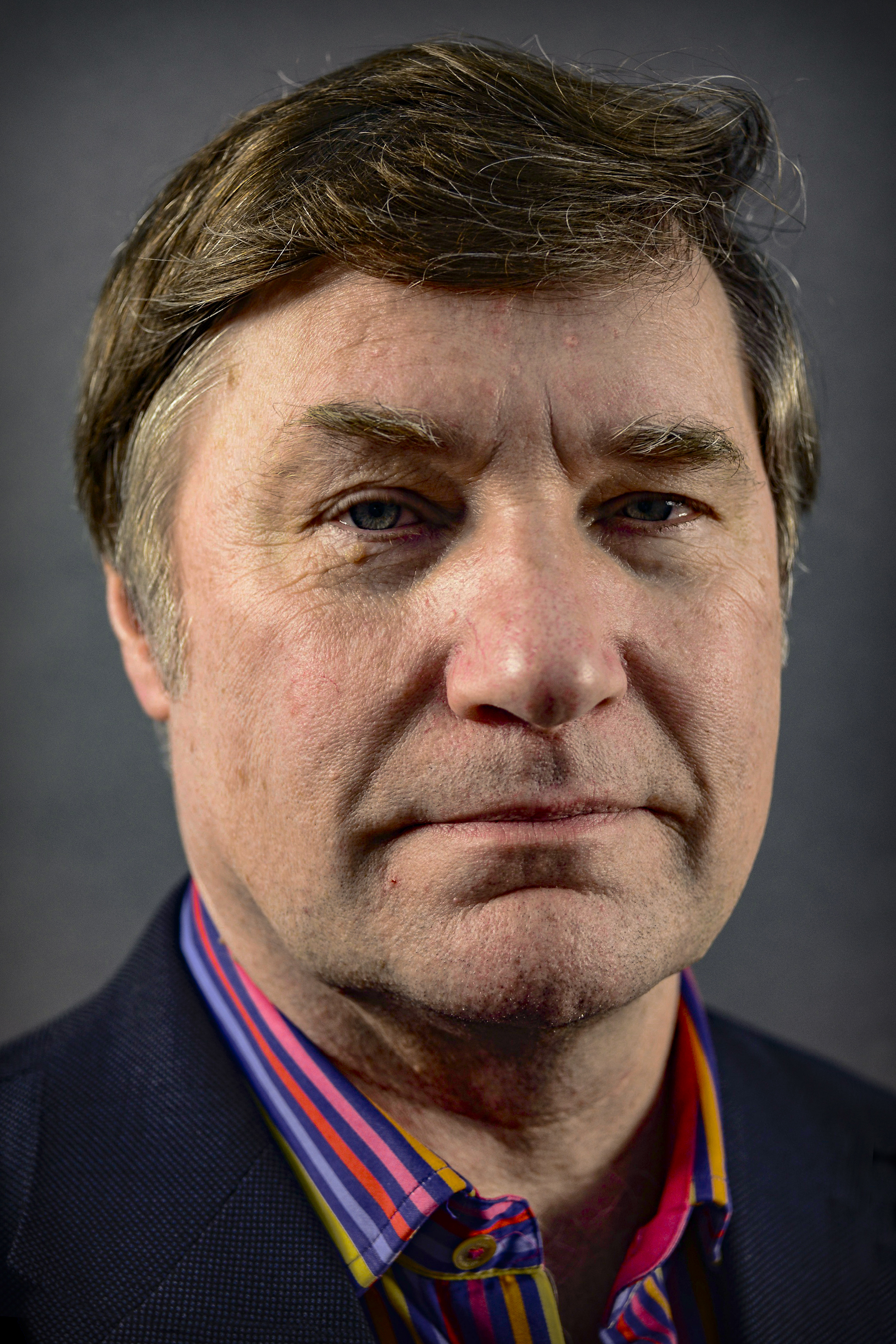
John D. Barrow

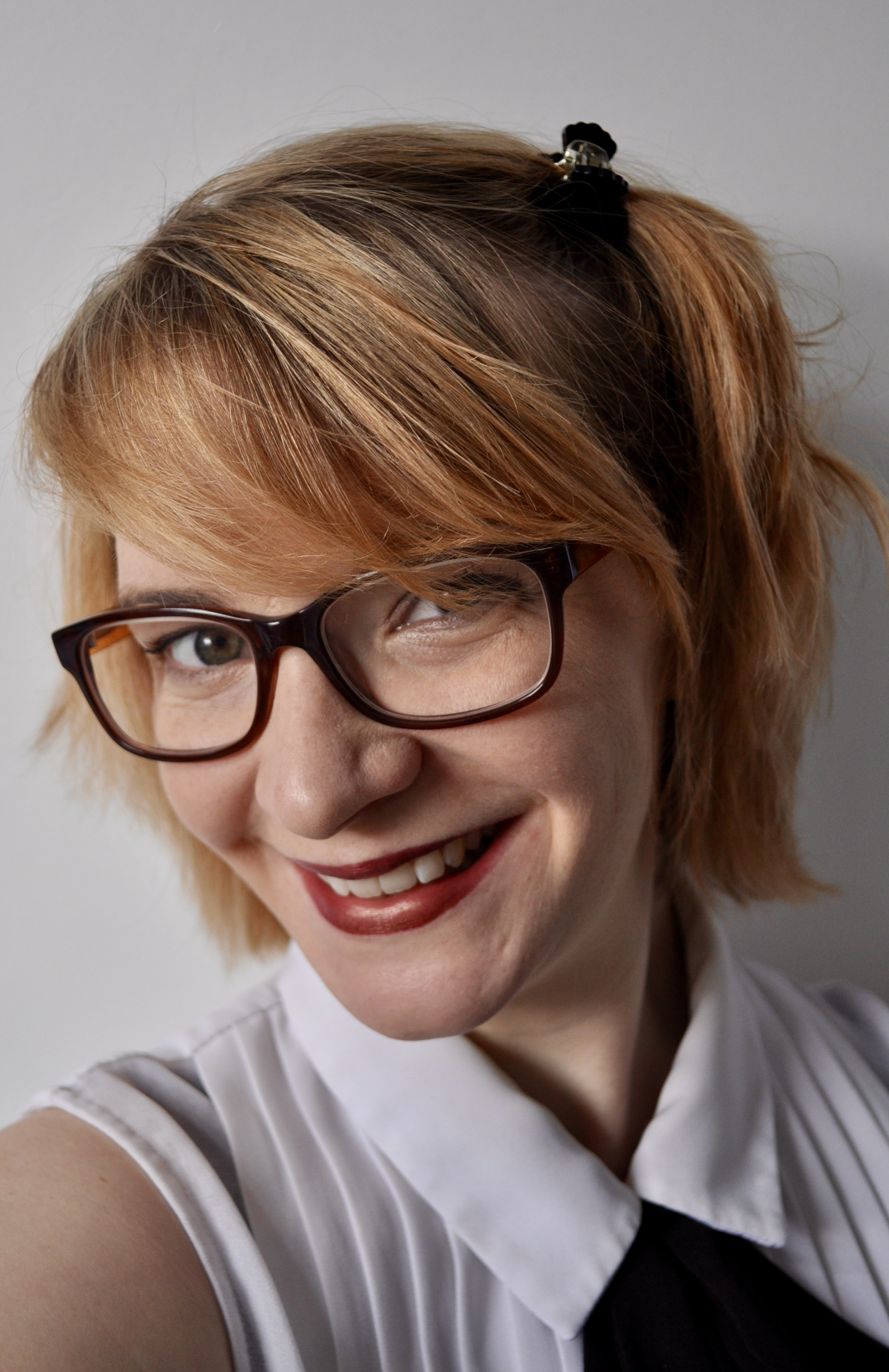
Emma Chapman

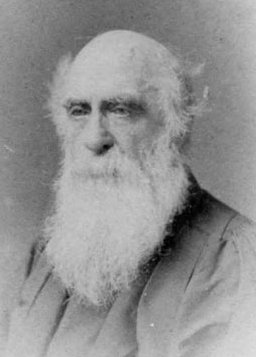
Temple Chevallier

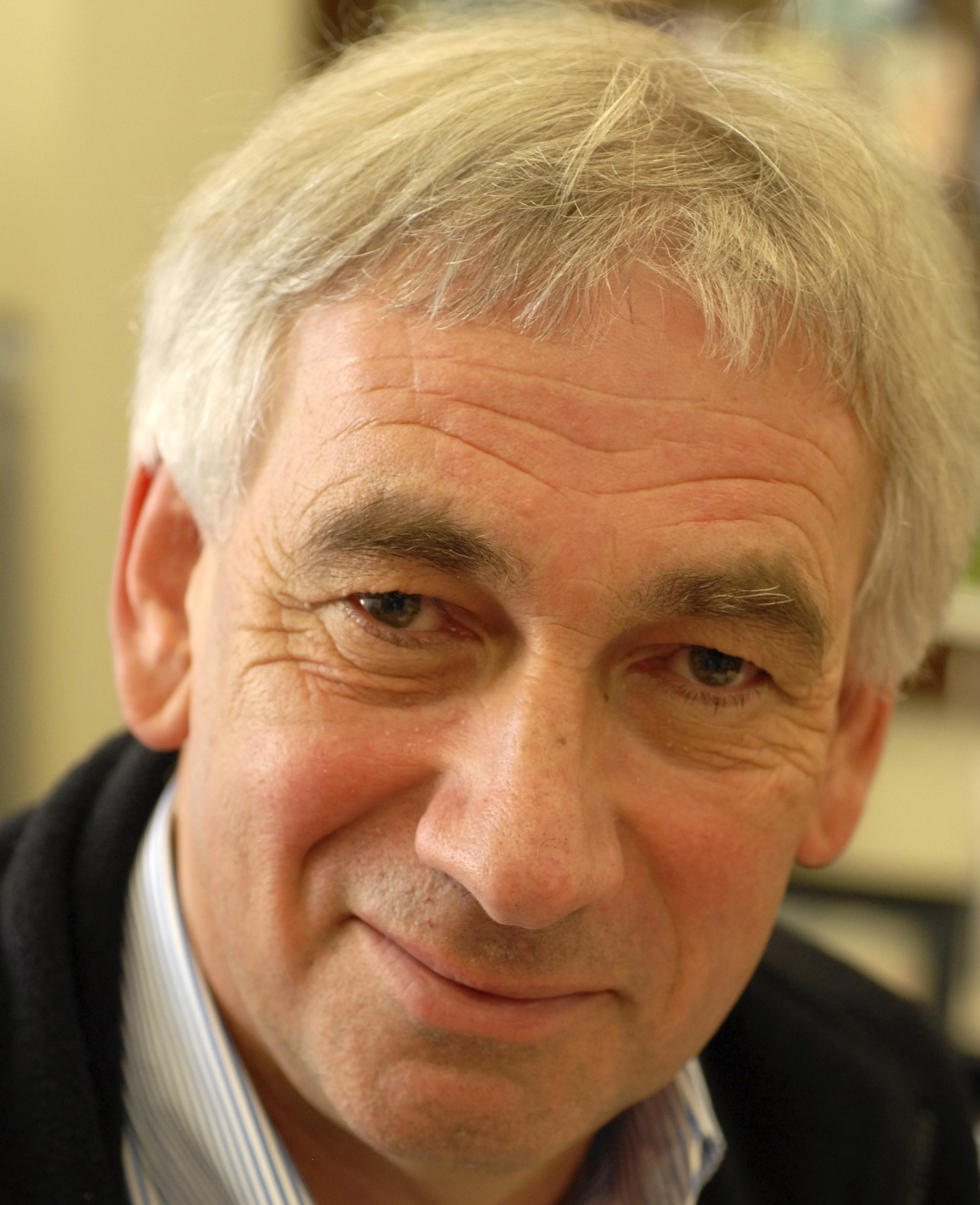
Richard Ellis

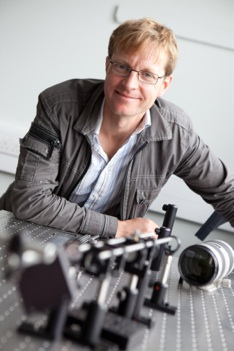
Gordon D. Love

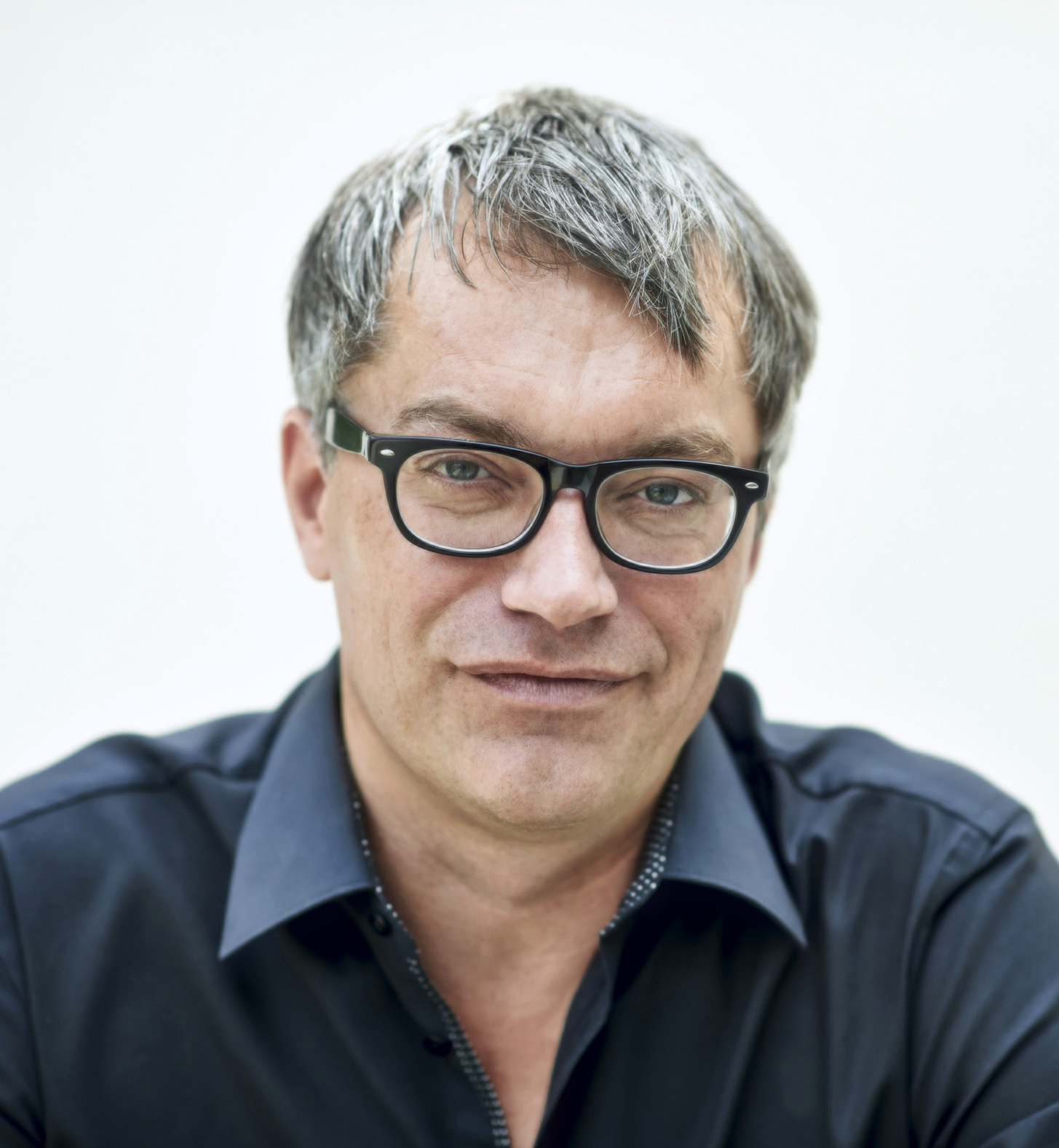
Ben Moore

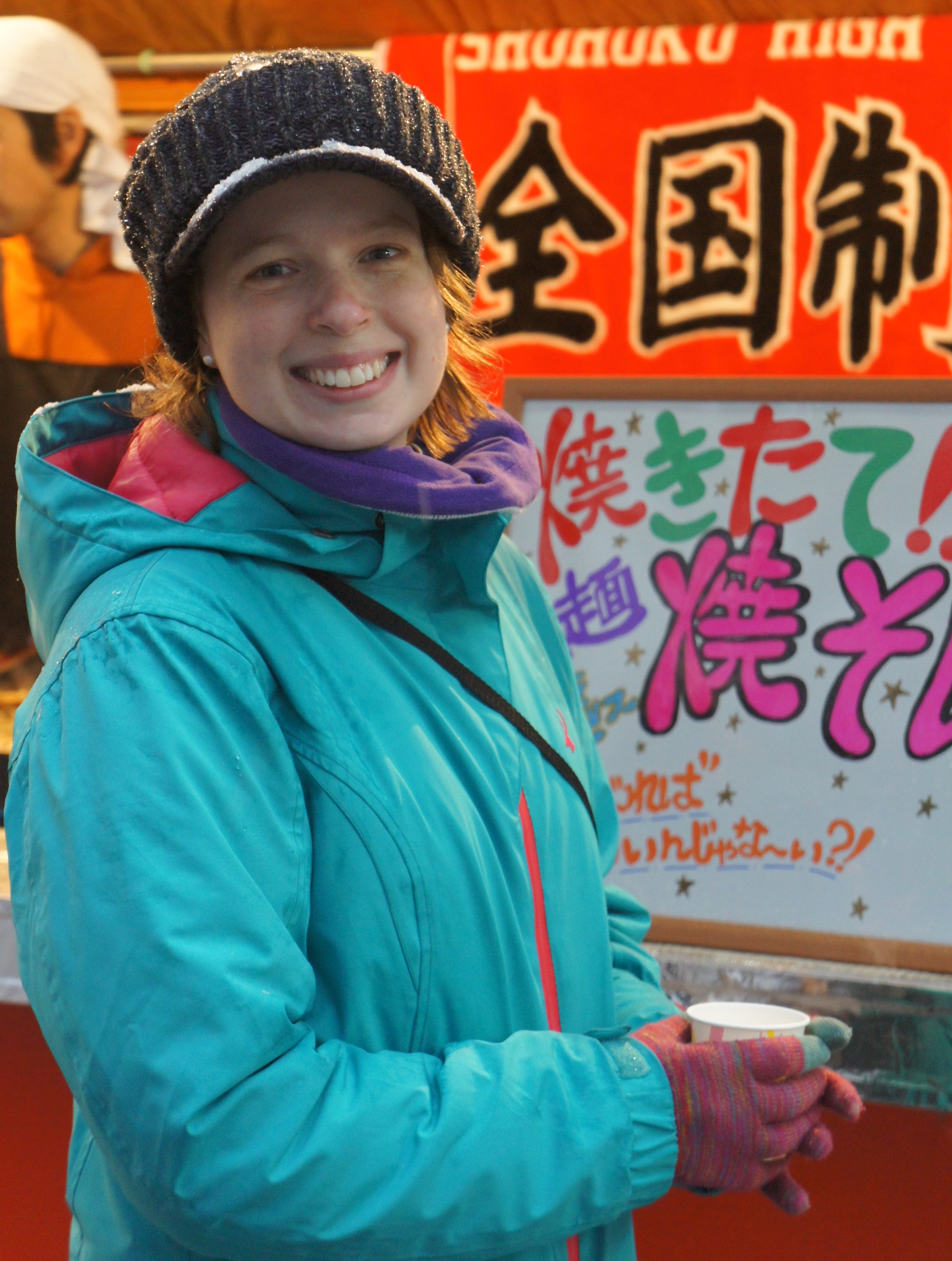
Elizabeth J. Tasker

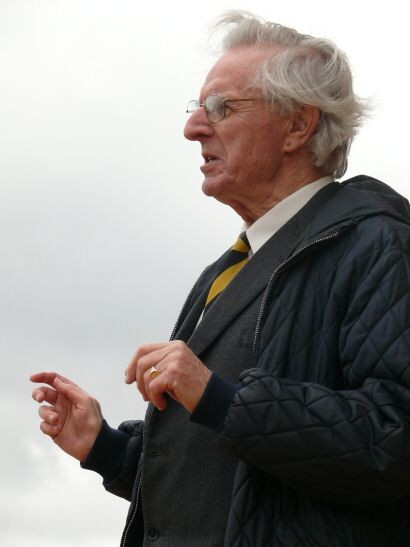
Arnold Wolfendale

- Aba Andam (Grad Soc) – President of the Ghana Academy of Arts and Sciences (2017–2019); the first female physicist from Ghana
- Karen Aplin (Trevelyan) – Professor of Space Science and Technology at University of Bristol
- David Axon (Hatfield) – Professor of Physics at the University of Hertfordshire and Rochester Institute of Technology
- Gilbert Ronald Bainbridge (Hatfield) – Wolfson Professor of Energy Studies at Newcastle University
- John Barrow FRS (Van Mildert) – Gresham Professor of Geometry (2008–2011); Templeton Prize (2006)
- Eric F. Bell (Grad Soc) – Arthur F. Thurnau Professor of Astronomy at the University of Michigan
- Brian J. Boyle (Grad Soc) – Director of the Australian Astronomical Observatory (1996–2003); Public Service Medal (2013)
- Olwyn Byron – Professor of Biophysics at the University of Glasgow; Rosalind Franklin Medal and Prize (2020)
- Richard Christopher Carrington FRS – "Observer" at Durham University Observatory (1849–1852)
- Martyn Chamberlain – Emeritus Professor of Physics at Durham University; Master of Grey College (2003–2011)
- Emma Chapman (Josephine Butler) – Dorothy Hodgkin Research Fellow at Imperial College London
- Temple Chevallier – Director of Durham University Observatory (1839–1871)
- Rosemary Coogan (University) - astrophysicist and European Space Agency astronaut
- Roger Davies – Philip Wetton Professor of Astrophysics at Oxford University; President of the Royal Astronomical Society (2010–2012)
- I. M. Dharmadasa (Grad Soc) – Emeritus Professor of Electronic Materials & Devices at Sheffield Hallam University
- George Efstathiou FRS (Grad Soc) – Savilian Professor of Astronomy at Oxford University (1988–1997)
- Richard Ellis FRS – Professor of Astronomy at UCL; Gold Medal of the Royal Astronomical Society (2011)
- Keith Ellis FRS – Professor of Physics at Durham University; Dirac Medal of the IOP (2019)
- Andrew Fisher – Professor of Physics at University College London; former lecturer at Durham (1993–1995)
- Carlos Frenk FRS – Ogden Professor of Fundamental Physics at Durham University (2001–); Rumford Medal (2021)
- Nigel Glover FRS (Hatfield) – Professor of Physics at Durham University
- Monica Grady (St Aidan's) – Professor of Planetary and Space Science at the Open University
- Lucien Hardy (Grad Soc) – Researcher at Perimeter Institute for Theoretical Physics best known for the Hardy's paradox thought experiment
- Alexander Stewart Herschel FRS – first Professor of Physics at the College of Physical Sciences
- Jeremy S. Heyl – Professor of Physics and Astronomy at University of British Columbia
- Harold Jeffreys FRS (Armstrong) – Plumian Professor of Astronomy and Experimental Philosophy at Cambridge University (1946–1958)
- Hans Kronberger – Scientist-in-Chief of the Reactor Group at UKAEA (1962–1969); Leverhulme Medal (1969)
- Chris Leighton – Distinguished McKnight University Professor of Chemical Engineering and Materials Science at the University of Minnesota
- Gordon D. Love (Van Mildert) – Professor of Computer Science and Physics at the University of Leeds
- John Lupton – Professor of Experimental Physics at University of Regensburg
- Alan Martin FRS – former Head of the Physics Department at Durham; Max Born Prize (2007)
- Richard Massey (University) – Professor of Physics at Durham University
- Tom McLeish FRS – Chair of Natural Philosophy at the University of York
- M. A. Wazed Miah (Grad Soc) – Chairman of the Bangladesh Atomic Energy Commission (–1999)
- Bahram Mobasher (Grad Soc) – Professor of Observational Astronomy at the University of California, Riverside
- Ben Moore – Director of the Center for Theoretical Astrophysics and Cosmology at the University of Zürich; Philip Leverhulme Prize (2001)
- Antonio Padilla – Professor of Physics at the University of Nottingham; Buchalter Cosmology Prize (2016)
- A. W. Pryor – Fellow of the Australian Institute of Physics; David Syme Research Prize (1964)
- George Rochester FRS (Armstrong) – British physicist known for having co-discovered, with Sir Clifford Butler, a subatomic particle called the kaon
- Graham Ross FRS (Grad Soc) – Emeritus Professor of Physics at Oxford University; Dirac Medal of the IOP (2012)
- Brian Scarlett (Hatfield) – Professor of Chemical Technology at Delft University of Technology (1983–2000)
- Caleb Scharf (University) – Director of the Columbia Astrobiology Center at Columbia University; Carl Sagan Medal (2022)
- Ian Smail (University) – Emeritus Professor of Physics at Durham University; Herschel Medal (2025)
- Graham Smith (Hatfield and Grad Soc) – Particle physicist; Head of Instrumentation Division at Brookhaven National Laboratory (2012–2017)
- Anna Stasto – Professor of Physics at Pennsylvania State University
- James Stirling FRS – Jacksonian Professor of Natural Philosophy at Cambridge (2008-2013); Provost of Imperial College (2013-2018)
- Paul Sutcliffe (University) – Professor of Theoretical Physics at Durham University; Whitehead Prize (2006)
- Mark Swinbank (St Cuthbert's) – Professor of Physics at Durham University; Philip Leverhulme Prize (2013)
- Nial Tanvir FRS (St Aidan's) – Professor of Physics and Astronomy at University of Leicester; Herschel Medal (2019)
- Elizabeth J. Tasker (Collingwood) – Associate Professor at Japan Aerospace Exploration Agency; author of The Planet Factory (2017)
- Sarah Thompson (Trevelyan) – Head of Physics Department at the University of York
- Samuel Tolansky FRS (Armstrong) – Professor of Physics at Royal Holloway College (1947–1973)
- John C. Travers (Hild Bede) – Professor of Physics at Heriot-Watt University; A. F. Harvey Prize (2022)
- Richard S. Ward FRS – Professor of Theoretical Physics at Durham University
- Gillian Wilson (Grad Soc) – Professor of Physics at University of California, Merced
- Robert Wilson (Kings College) – Pioneer of the International Ultraviolet Explorer
- Arnold Wolfendale FRS – Emeritus Professor of Physics at Durham University; Astronomer Royal (1991–1995)

=== Chemists ===
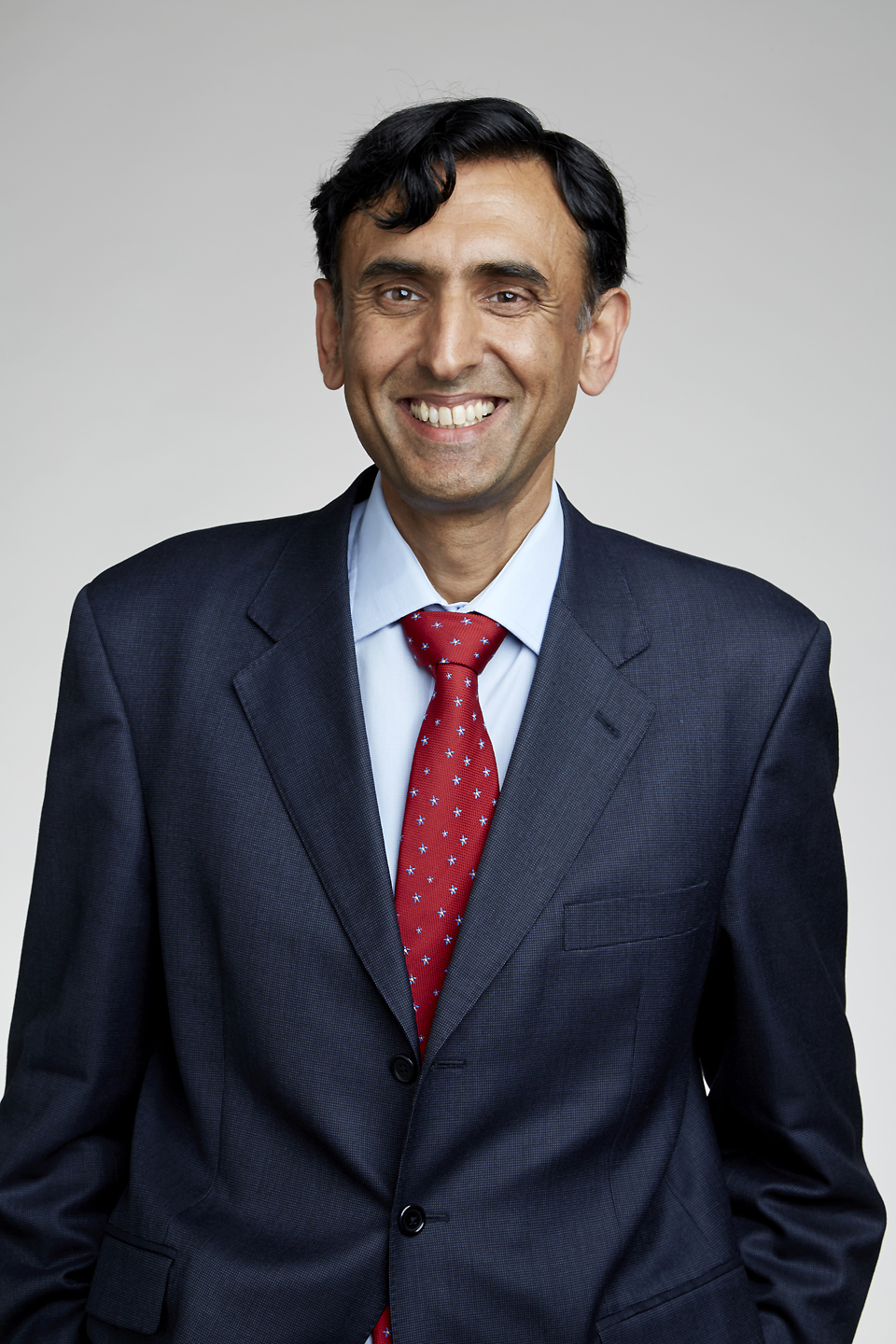
Jas Pal Badyal

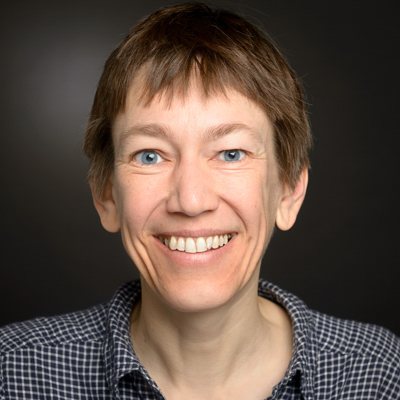
Jacqui Cole

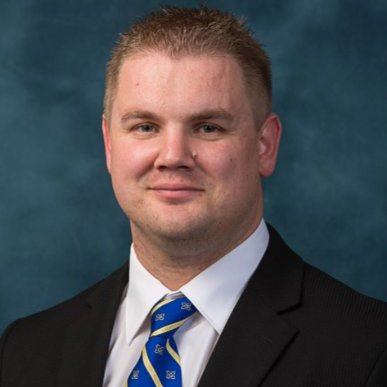
Peter J. H. Scott

- Cyril Clifford Addison FRS (Hatfield) – Professor of Inorganic Chemistry at University of Nottingham (1960–78)
- Jas Pal Badyal FRS – Professor of Chemistry at Durham University; Edward Harrison Memorial Prize (1993)
- Neil Bartlett FRS (King's) – Emeritus Professor of Chemistry at University of California, Berkeley; Davy Medal (2002)
- Richard Dickinson Chambers FRS (University) – Professor of Chemistry at Durham University (1976–2000)
- Tristram Chivers (Hatfield) – Emeritus Professor of Chemistry at University of Calgary
- Geoffrey E. Coates – Head of the Chemistry Department at Durham University (1953–1968)
- Jacqui Cole (Grey) – Head of Molecular Engineering at Cavendish Laboratory
- James Feast FRS – President of the Royal Society of Chemistry (2006–08), Royal Medal (2007)
- Rebecca Goss (Hatfield) – Professor of Organic Chemistry at University of St. Andrews (2018–); Meldola Medal and Prize (2006)
- James Finlay Weir Johnston FRS – Professor in Chemistry and Mineralogy, first Durham Fellow of the Royal Society (elected 1837)
- Judith Howard FRS – Professor of Chemistry at Durham University
- Jeremy Hutson FRS – Professor of Physics and Chemistry at Durham University (1996–); Tilden Prize (2011)
- David Lilley FRS (Van Mildert) – Professor of Molecular Biology at the University of Dundee; Colworth Medal (1982)
- Rachel McKendry (Trevelyan) – Professor at London Centre for Nanotechnology; Rosalind Franklin Award (2014)
- Elizabeth New (Ustinov) – Professor of Chemistry at University of Sydney; Eureka Prize (2018)
- Friedrich Paneth FRS – Professor of Chemistry at Durham, 1939–1953
- David Parker FRS – Professor of Chemistry at Durham (1992–); twice Head of Department
- John A. Pyle FRS (Grey) – Professor of Physical Chemistry at the University of Cambridge (2007–2018)
- Peter J. H. Scott (Ustinov) – Professor of Radiology and Pharmacology at University of Michigan
- Peter Skabara (Grad Soc) – Ramsay Professor of Chemistry at University of Glasgow

=== Classicists and Archaeologists ===
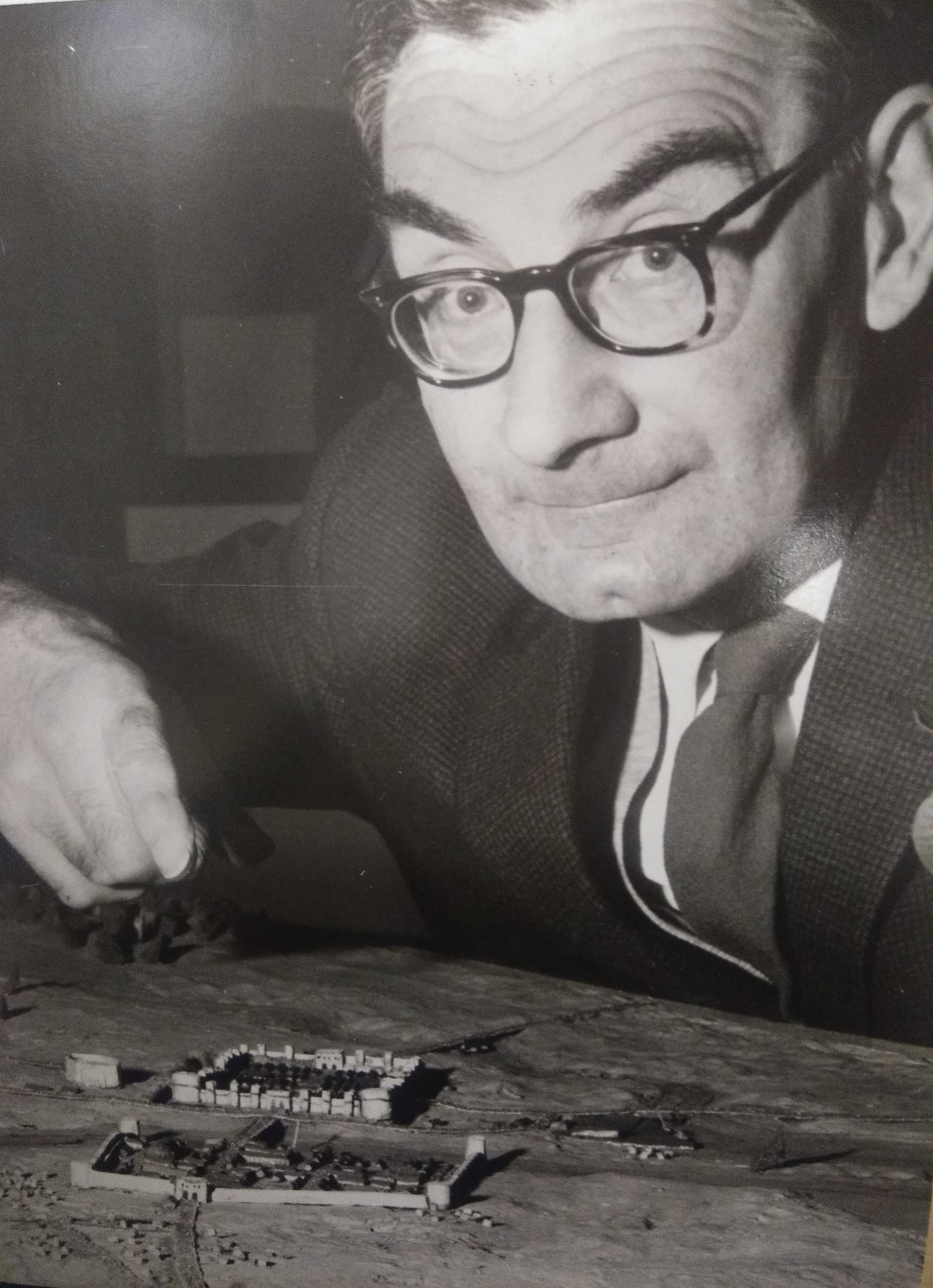
Leslie Peter Wenham

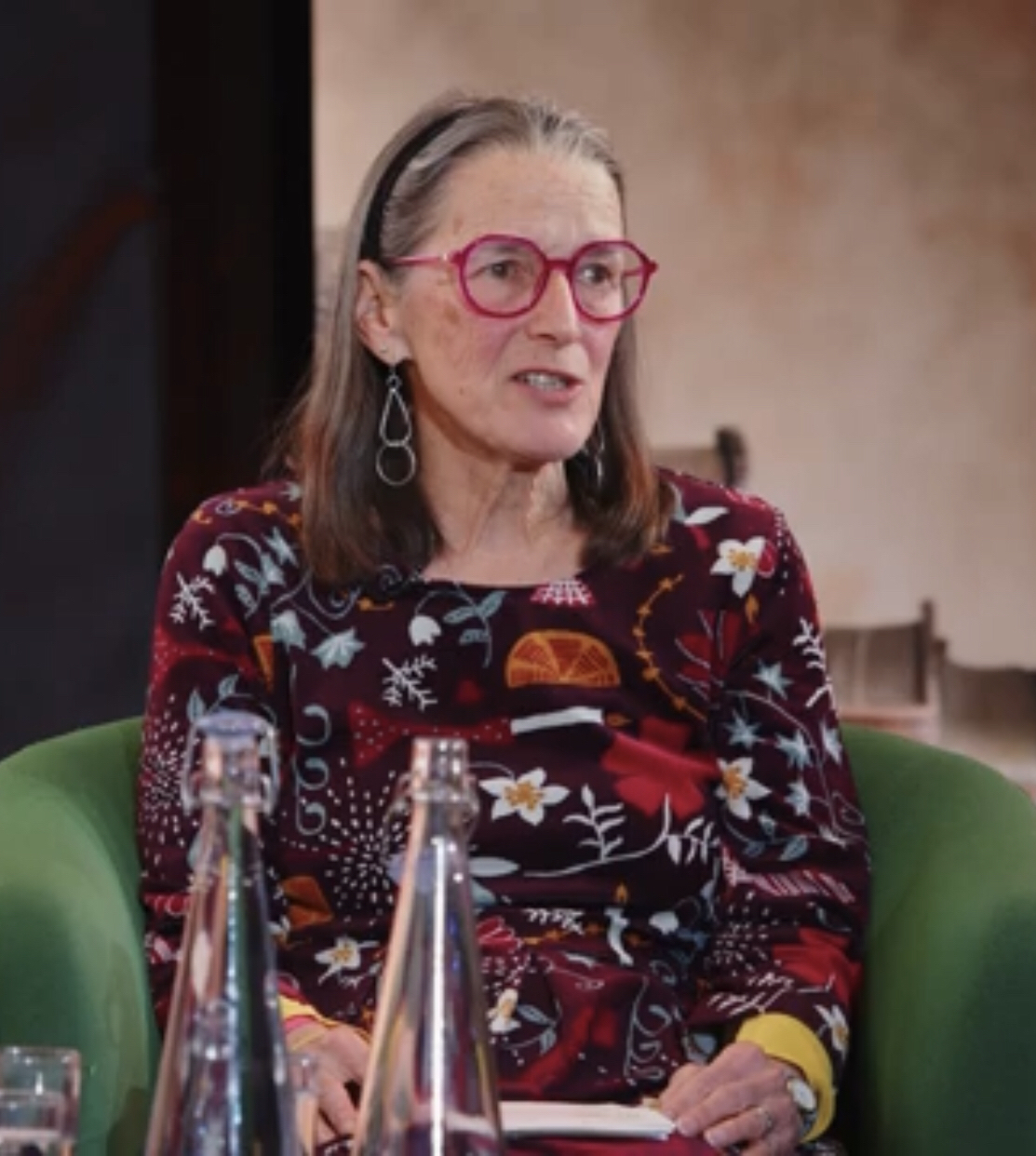
Charlotte Roberts

- John Atkinson (Hatfield) – Emeritus Professor of Classics at University of Cape Town
- Eric Birley – Master of Hatfield College (1949–1956)
- David Breeze (University) – Chief Inspector of Ancient Monuments for Historic Scotland (1989–2005)
- Martin Carver – Professor of Archaeology at the University of York
- Sam Challis (Hatfield) – Director of the Rock Art Research Institute (RARI) at the University of the Witwatersrand
- Robin Coningham – Professor of Early Medieval Archaeology; UNESCO Chair in Archaeological Ethics and Practice in Cultural Heritage
- Roy W. Davies (Hatfield) – classicist and historian of the Roman army; Service in the Roman Army (1989)
- Brian Dobson (Hatfield) – Reader Emeritus of Durham University; President of the Society of Antiquaries of Newcastle
- Robert Malcolm Errington (Hatfield) – Emeritus Professor of Ancient History at University of Marburg
- Alan Greaves (Grey) – Lecturer in Archaeology at University of Liverpool
- William Greenwell FRS (University) – archaeologist, canon at Durham Cathedral
- Birgitta Hoffmann (Ustinov) – Director of the Roman Gask Project
- Michael Jarrett (Hatfield) – Professor of Archaeology at Cardiff University
- Iain MacIvor (Hatfield) – Chief Inspector of Ancient Monuments for Scotland (1980–1989)
- Charlotte Roberts - Professor of Archaeology at Durham University (since 2004)
- J. E. H. Spaul (Hatfield) – British epigrapher and specialist on the Army of the Roman Empire
- Malcolm Todd – Professor of Archaeology at the University of Exeter (1979–1996); Principal of Trevelyan College (1996–2000)
- Leslie Peter Wenham – Head of History at St. John's College, York
- Tony Wilkinson – Professor of Archaeology (2006–2014)

=== Computer scientists ===
- Sue Black – Professor of Computer Science and Technology Evangelist at Durham University
- Leslie Blackett Wilson (King's) – former Chair of Computer Science at the University of Stirling
- Keith Clark (Hatfield) – Emeritus Professor in the Department of Computing at Imperial College London
- Simon Colton (St Aidan's) – Professor of Computational Creativity at Queen Mary University of London
- Max Garagnani (Grad Soc) – Lecturer, Department of Computing, Goldsmiths University of London
- David Gavaghan (Grey) – Professor of Computational Biology at University of Oxford
- Edwin Hancock (Grey) – Emeritus Professor of Computer Vision at the University of York

=== Economists and Political scientists ===
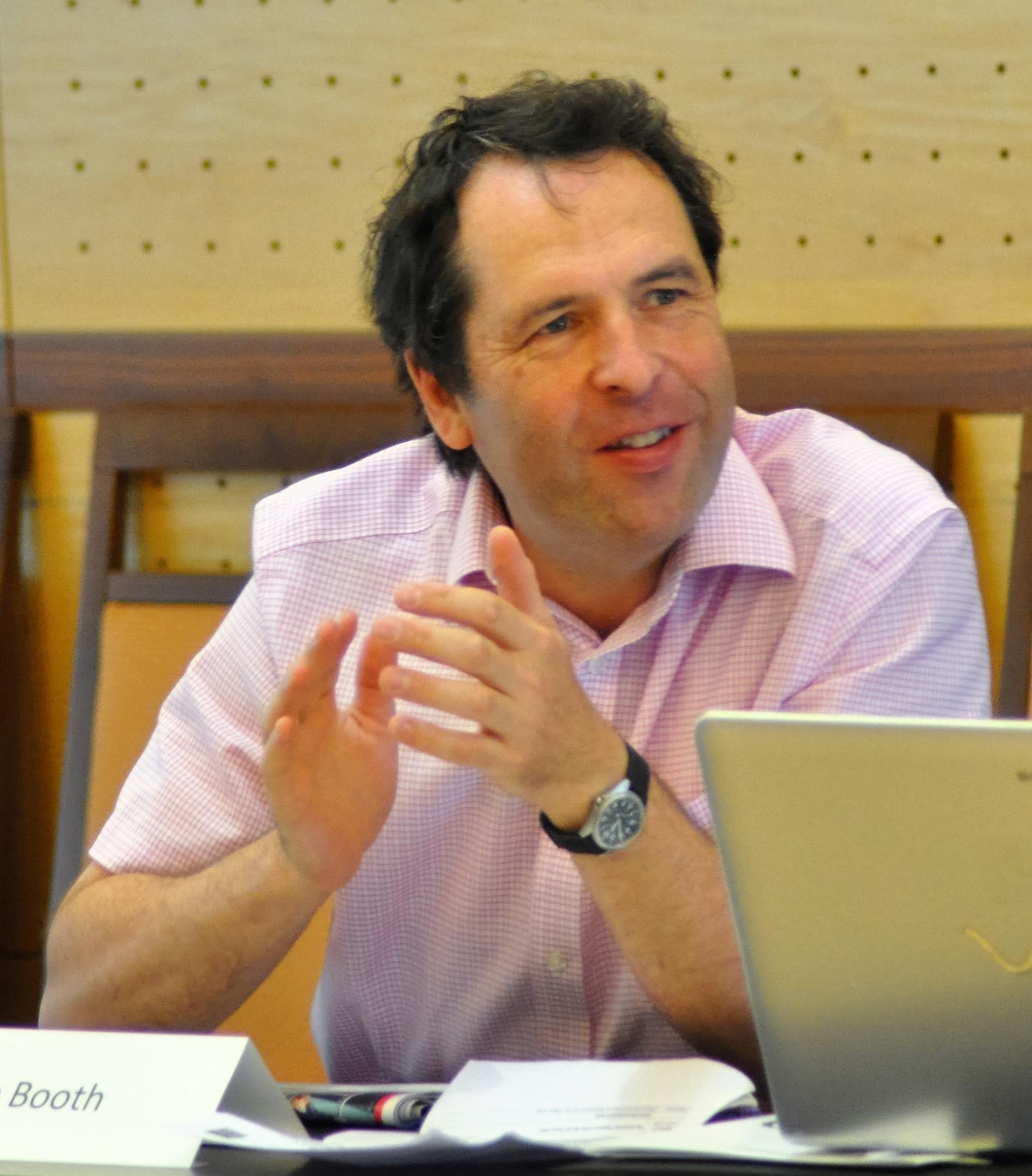
Philip Booth

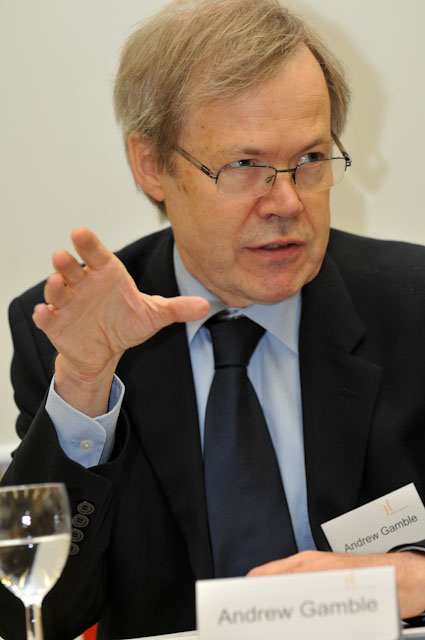
Andrew Gamble

- Ewan Anderson – Emeritus Professor of Geopolitics at Durham
- Alexander Betts – Professor of Forced Migration and International Affairs at University of Oxford
- Luiza Bialasiewicz – Jean Monnet Professor of EU External Relations at the University of Amsterdam
- Philip Booth (Hatfield) – Senior Academic Fellow at the Institute of Economic Affairs
- Thom Brooks – Professor of Law and Government; Dean of Durham Law School; incoming Principal of Collingwood College
- Gordon Cameron (Hatfield) – Professor of Land Economy at Cambridge University; Master of Fitzwilliam College, Cambridge (1988–1990)
- Neil Carter (St Chad's) – Professor of Politics at the University of York
- Andrew Cumbers (Grad Soc) – Professor of Political Economy at the Adam Smith Business School, University of Glasgow
- Anoush Ehteshami – Professor and Joint Director of the ESRC Centre for the Advanced Study of the Arab World, Durham
- Anthony Forster – Vice-Chancellor of the University of Essex
- Andrew Gamble (Grad Soc) – Professor of Politics at the University of Sheffield (1986–2007)
- Mark N. Katz – Professor of Government and Politics at George Mason University; William Luce Fellow (April–June 2018)
- Eduardo Mendieta – Professor at Penn State University; former fellow at Institute of Advanced Study
- Roger Scully – Professor of Political Science at Cardiff University
- Steven B. Smith (St Cuthbert's) – Professor of Political Science at Yale University; Master of Branford College (1996-2011)
- Gareth Stansfield (Hatfield and Hild Bede) – Professor of Middle East Studies at University of Exeter
- Suha Taji-Farouki (St Mary's) – Lecturer in Modern Islam at University of Exeter
- Giles Ji Ungpakorn – Thai dissident; Professor of Political Science at International University of Humanities and Social Sciences (Costa Rica)

=== Engineers and Mathematicians ===
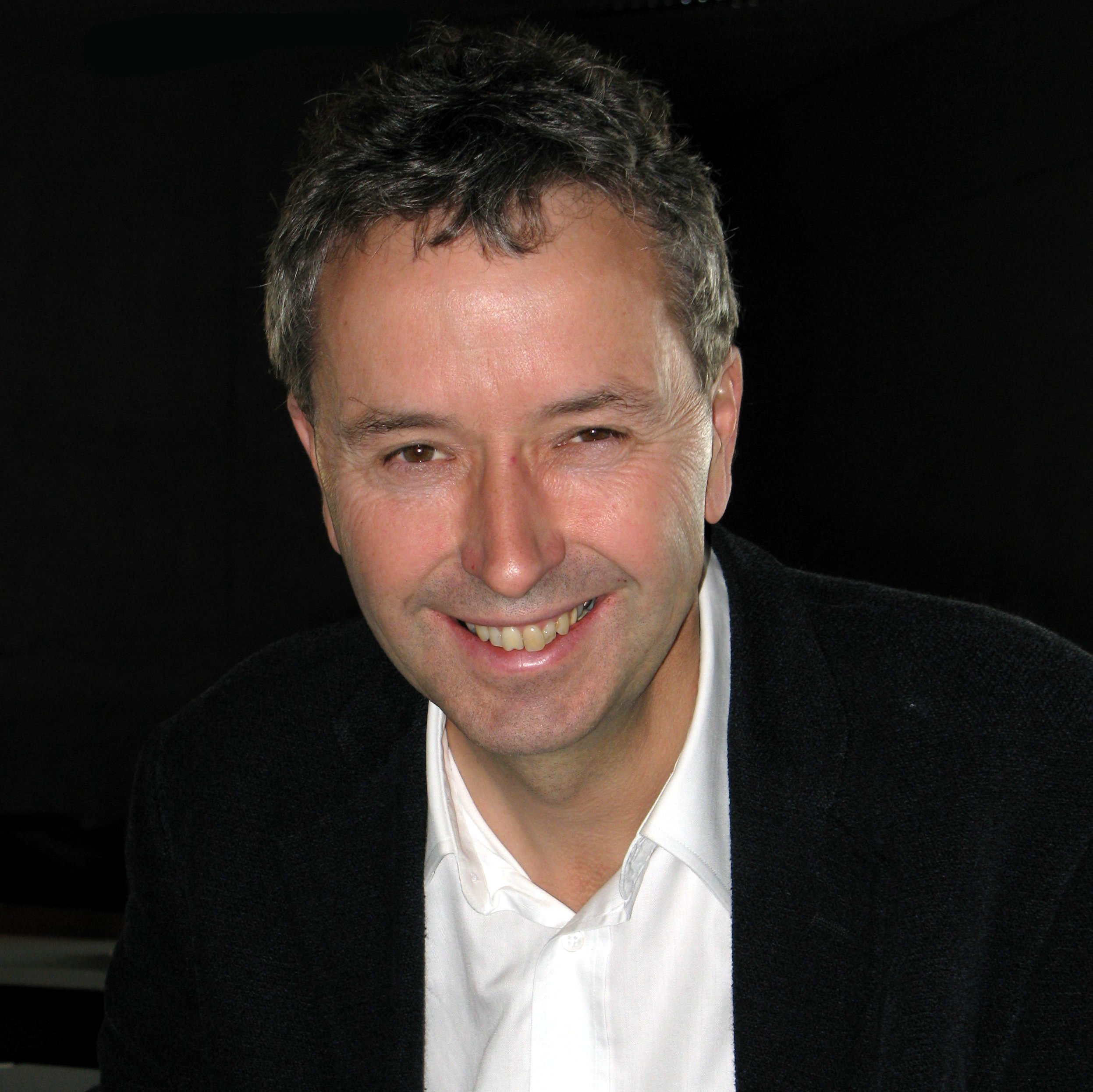
Frank Kelly

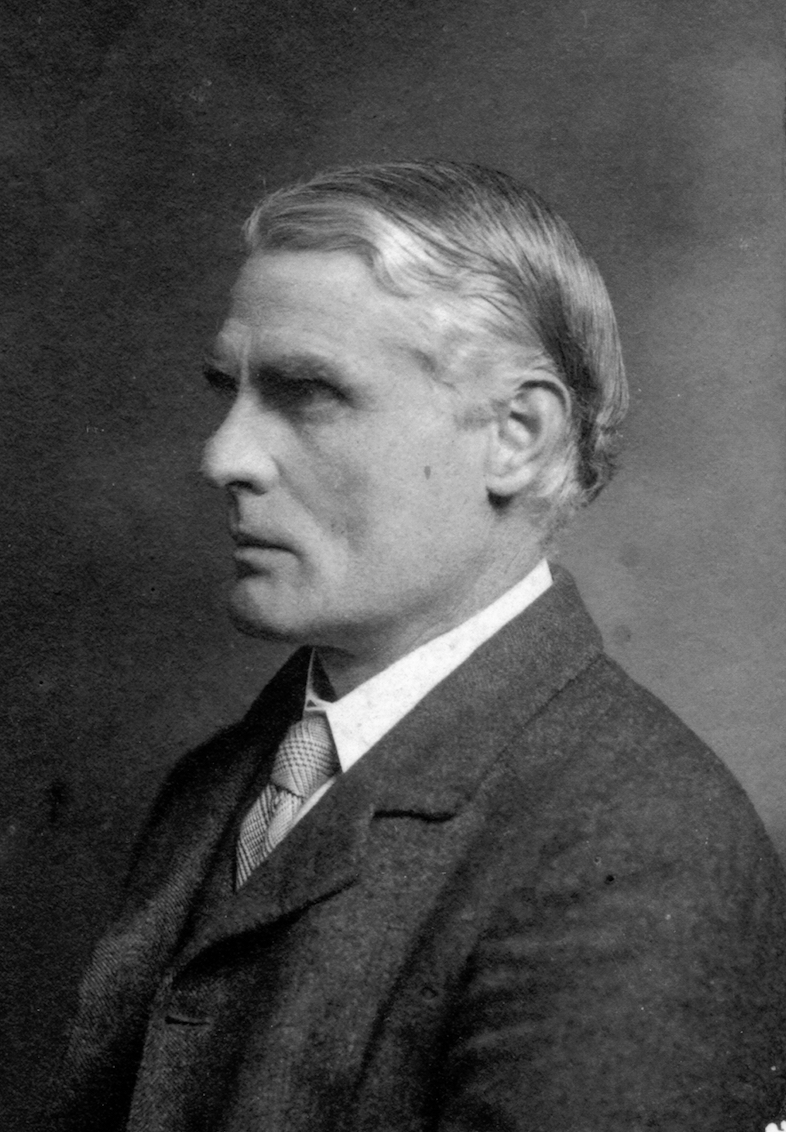
William Herrick Macaulay

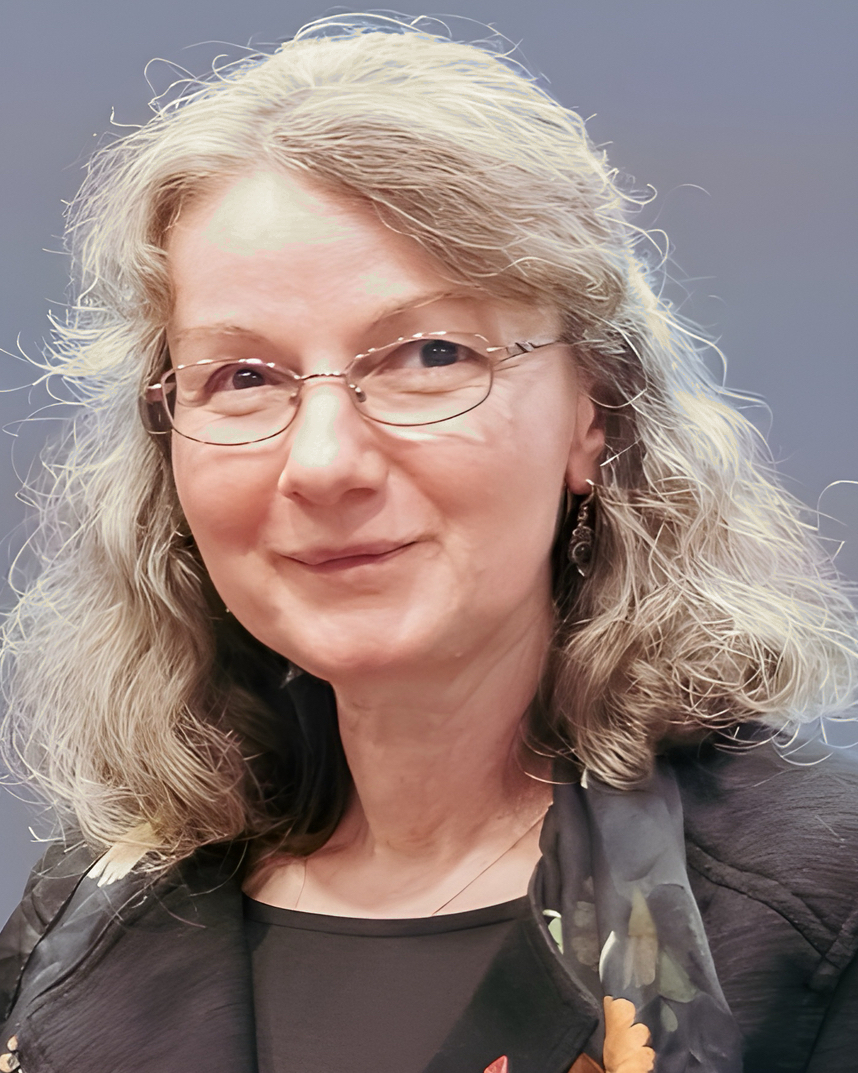
Angela Mihai

- Mark Ainsworth (Grey) – Francis Wayland Professor of Applied Mathematics at Brown University.
- Julian Besag FRS – Professor of Mathematics at Durham University; Guy Medal (1983)
- Ed Corrigan FRS – Professor of Mathematics at the University of York, Principal of Collingwood College (2008–11)
- Ron Doney (University) – Emeritus Professor of Mathematics at University of Manchester
- Patrick Dorey – Professor of Mathematics at Durham University
- H. Martyn Evans – Professor in Humanities in Medicine at Durham University; Principal of Trevelyan College (2008–2019)
- Ian Fells – Emeritus Professor of Energy Conversion at Newcastle University, Michael Faraday Prize (1993)
- David Grant (Grad Soc) – Vice-Chancellor of Cardiff University (2001–2012); Vice-President of the Royal Academy of Engineering (2007–2012)
- Ruth Gregory – Professor of Mathematics and Physics at Durham University (2005–2021); Maxwell Medal and Prize (2006)
- Julian Higgins – Professor of Evidence Synthesis and Director of Research at the Department of Population Health Sciences
- Frank Kelly FRS (Van Mildert) – Professor of the Mathematics of Systems in the Statistical Laboratory, University of Cambridge; Master of Christ's College, Cambridge since 2006
- Peter Kyberd (Hatfield) – Head of the School of Energy and Electrical Engineering at Portsmouth University
- William Herrick Macaulay (University) – Lecturer in Mathematics at University of Cambridge; Vice-Provost of King's College, Cambridge (1918–1924)
- Michael Magee – Professor of Mathematics at Durham University; Whitehead Prize (2021)
- Nigel Martin – Senior Lecturer in Mathematics at Durham University; Principal of Trevelyan College (2000–2008)
- Angela Mihai (Grey) – Professor of Applied Mathematics at Cardiff University
- John R. Parker (St Cuthbert's) – Professor of Mathematics at Durham University; Editor-in-Chief of Geometriae Dedicata (2013–2022)
- Rosemary Renaut (Collingwood) – Professor of Mathematics at Arizona State University
- Xiaoying Zhuang – Professor of Computational Science and Simulation Technology at Leibniz University Hannover

=== Geographers and Earth Scientists ===
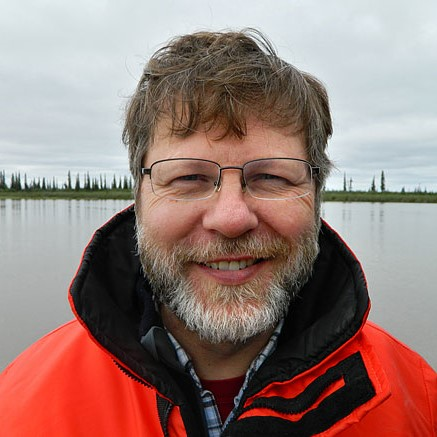
Chris Burn

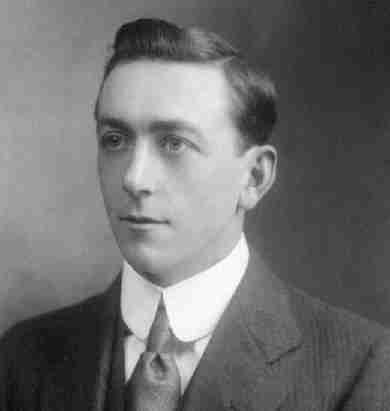
Arthur Holmes

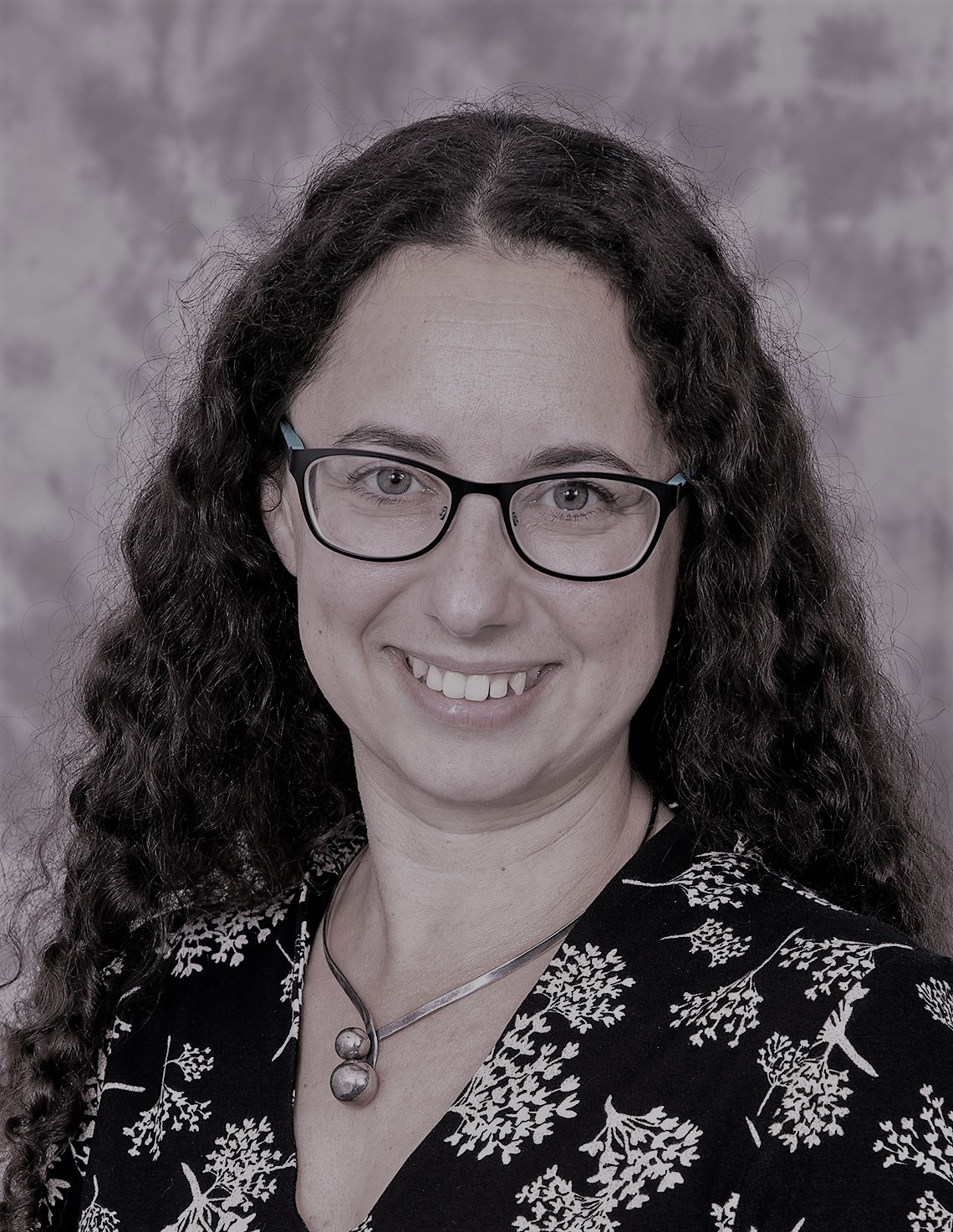
Claire Horwell

- John Anthony Allan (University) – Professor in Geography at King's College, London; Stockholm Water Prize (2008)
- Jay Appleton (King's) – British geographer
- Ash Amin – Professor of Geography at Cambridge University
- Richard Arculus (Hatfield) – Professor in School of Earth Sciences at Australian National University
- Gerald Blake – Geographer and Principal of Collingwood College (1987–2001)
- Andrew Blowers (Hatfield) – Geographer known for his work on nuclear waste management; Alexander & Ilse Melamid Medal (2018)
- Martin Bott FRS – Emeritus Professor in the Department of Earth Sciences; Wollaston Medal (1992)
- George Malcolm Brown FRS (University) – Director of the British Geological Survey; Murchison Medal (1981)
- Christopher Burn (Hatfield) – Emeritus Chancellor's Professor in the Department of Geography and Environmental Studies at Carleton University; Polar Medal (2018)
- William Campbell (College of Science) – metallographer to the United States Coast and Geodetic Survey
- Mike Crang – Professor of Cultural Geography at Durham University
- Sarah Curtis – Professor of Health and Risk at Durham University
- Bethan Davies (Hatfield) – Professor of Glaciology at Newcastle University; Richardson Medal (2024)
- John Frederick Dewey – Professor of Geology at Oxford University (1986–2000)
- Kingsley Charles Dunham FRS (Hatfield) – Director of the British Geological Survey; Wollaston Medal (1976)
- Ghazi Falah (Hild Bede) – Geographer at University of Akron
- Gillian Foulger (Unattached) – Professor of Geophysics at Durham University; Price Medal (2005)
- Paul Lewis Hancock (University) – Editor of Journal of Structural Geology
- Peter Liss (University) – Emeritus Professor of Environmental Science at the University of East Anglia
- David Harper – Professor of Palaeontology in Earth Sciences; Principal of Van Mildert College (2011–2021)
- Joseph Holden (Hatfield) – Professor of Physical Geography at University of Leeds
- Arthur Holmes – Chair of Geology at the University of Edinburgh; Vetlesen Prize (1964)
- Claire Horwell – Professor of Geohealth at Department of Earth Sciences, Durham University
- Ray Hudson – Lecturer in Geography; Director of the Wolfson Research Institute (2003-2007)
- Malcolm K. Hughes (University) – Regents' Professor of Dendrochronology at the University of Arizona; co-producer of the hockey stick graph
- Basil Charles King (Hatfield) – Professor of Geology at Bedford College; Bigsby Medal (1959)
- Geoffrey King (Hatfield) – Senior Research Professor in Geophysics at the Institut de Physique du Globe de Paris
- Ian Main (Grad Soc) – Professor of Seismology and Rock Physics at the University of Edinburgh
- Gordon Manley – Professor of Geography at Bedford College (1948–1964); President of the Royal Meteorological Society (1945–1947)
- Stewart McPherson – TV presenter and conservationist; David Given Award for Excellence in Plant Conservation (2012)
- Philip Ogden (Hatfield) – Emeritus Professor of Geography at Queen Mary University of London
- Ian Parsons (Hatfield) – Emeritus Professor of Mineralogy at the University of Edinburgh
- Frank Pasquill (University) – Deputy Chief Scientific Officer at the Met Office
- Roger Powell FRS (Van Mildert) – Emeritus Professor in the School of Earth Sciences at the University of Melbourne
- David Sadler (University) – Professor of Human Geography at the University of Liverpool
- David Vaughan (Hatfield) - Scientist at British Antarctic Survey; Lead Author of the IPCC Fourth Assessment Report
- Lawrence Wager FRS – Professor of Geology at Durham University
- Ming Hung Wong (St Cuthbert's) – Advisor (Environmental Science) in the Department of Science and Environmental Studies at the Education University of Hong Kong
- Philip Woodworth (Hatfield) - Oceanographer; former Director of the Permanent Service for Mean Sea Level

=== Historians and Antiquarians ===
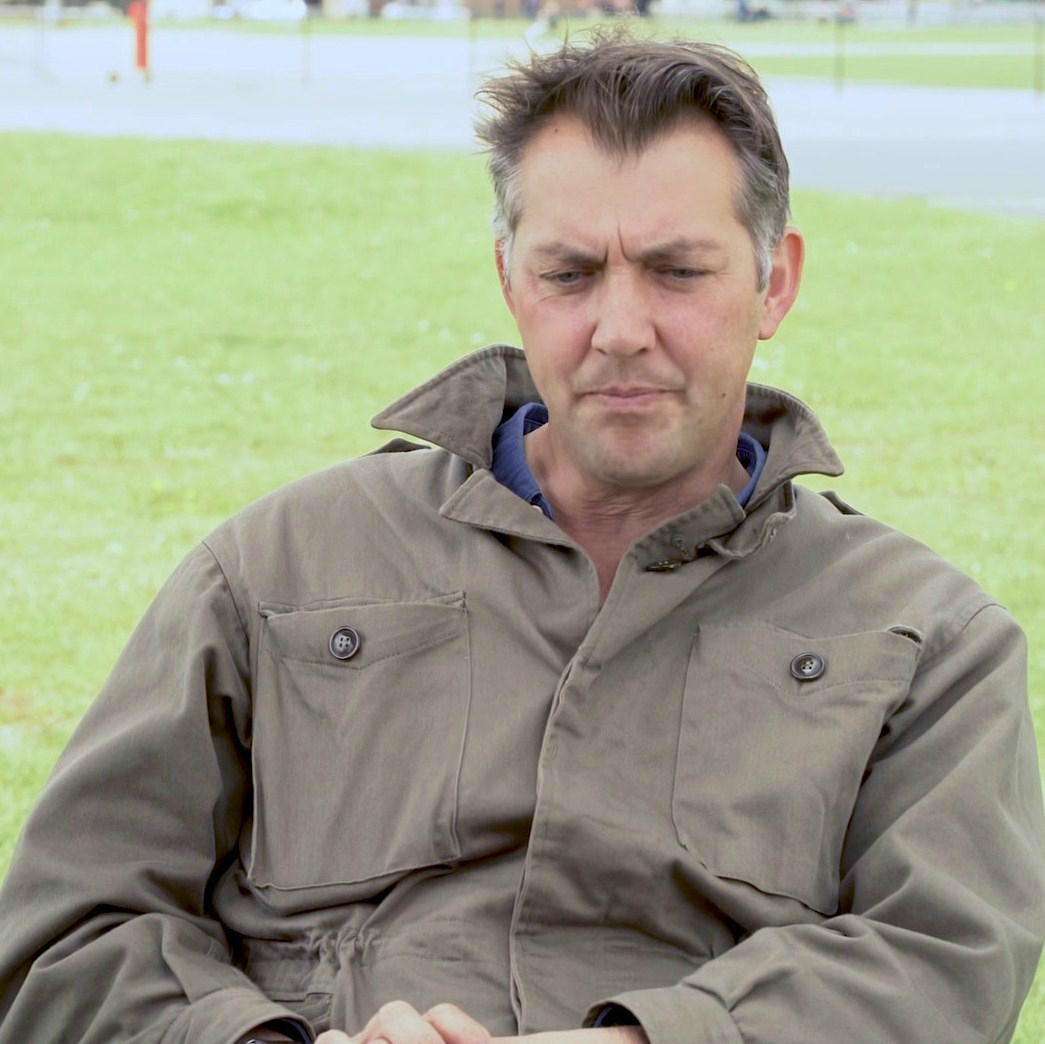
James Holland

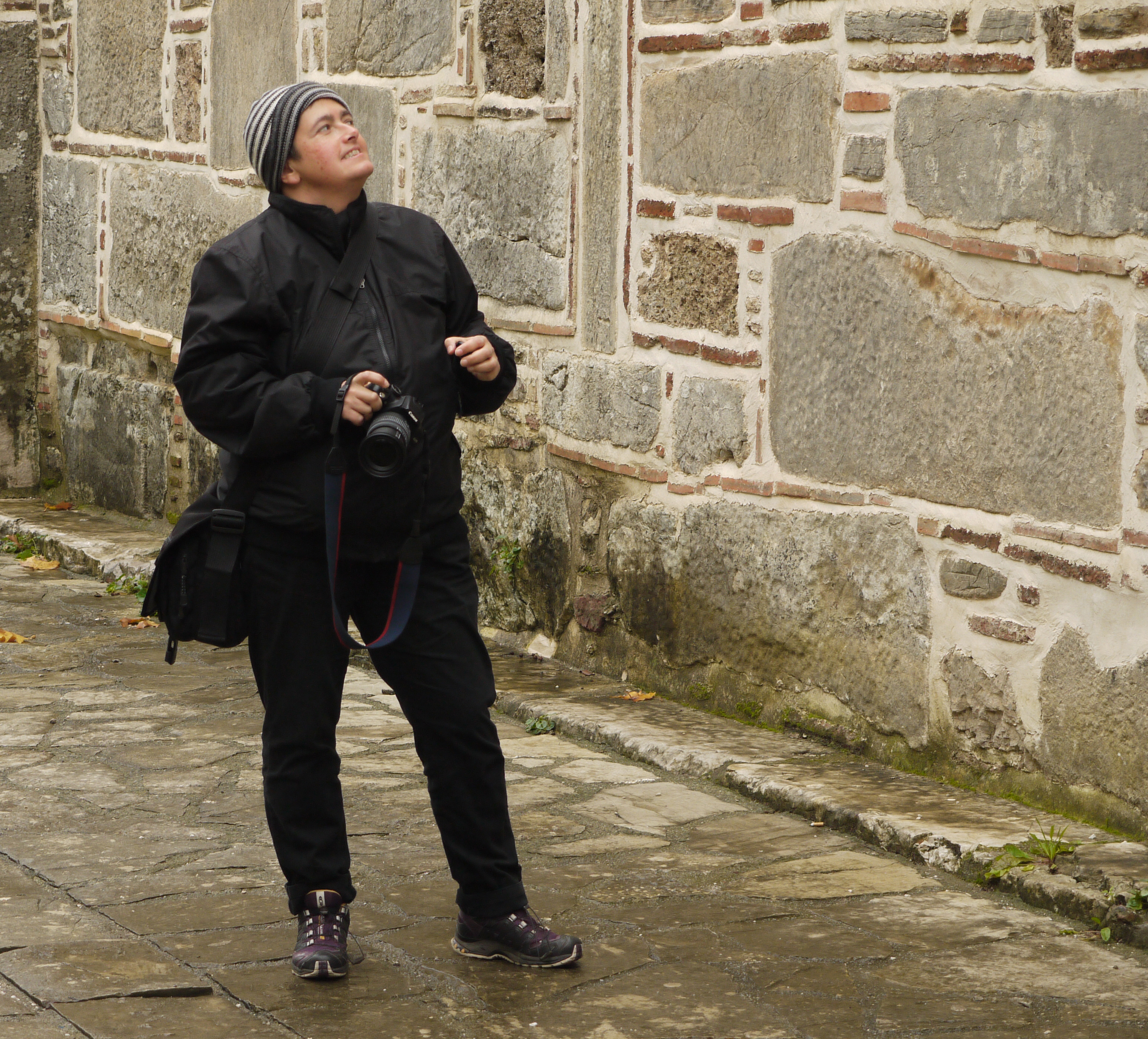
Liz James

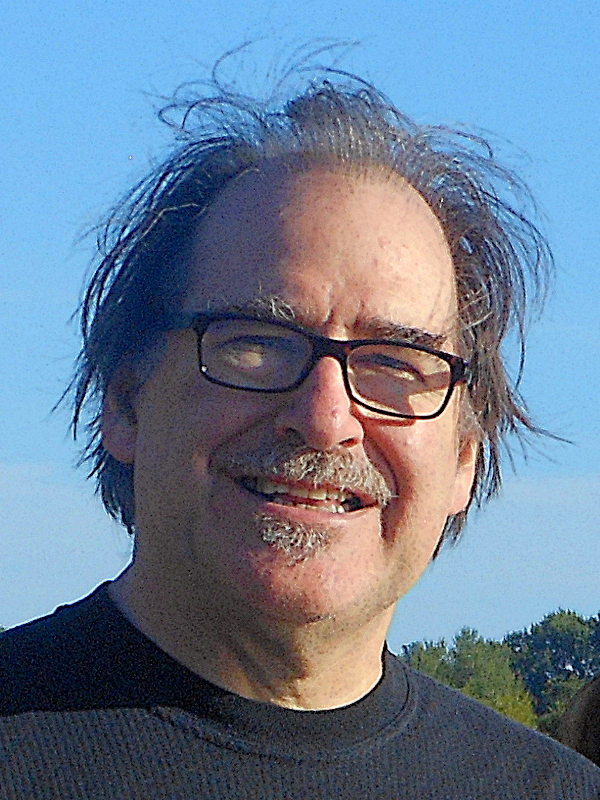
Jack Ogden

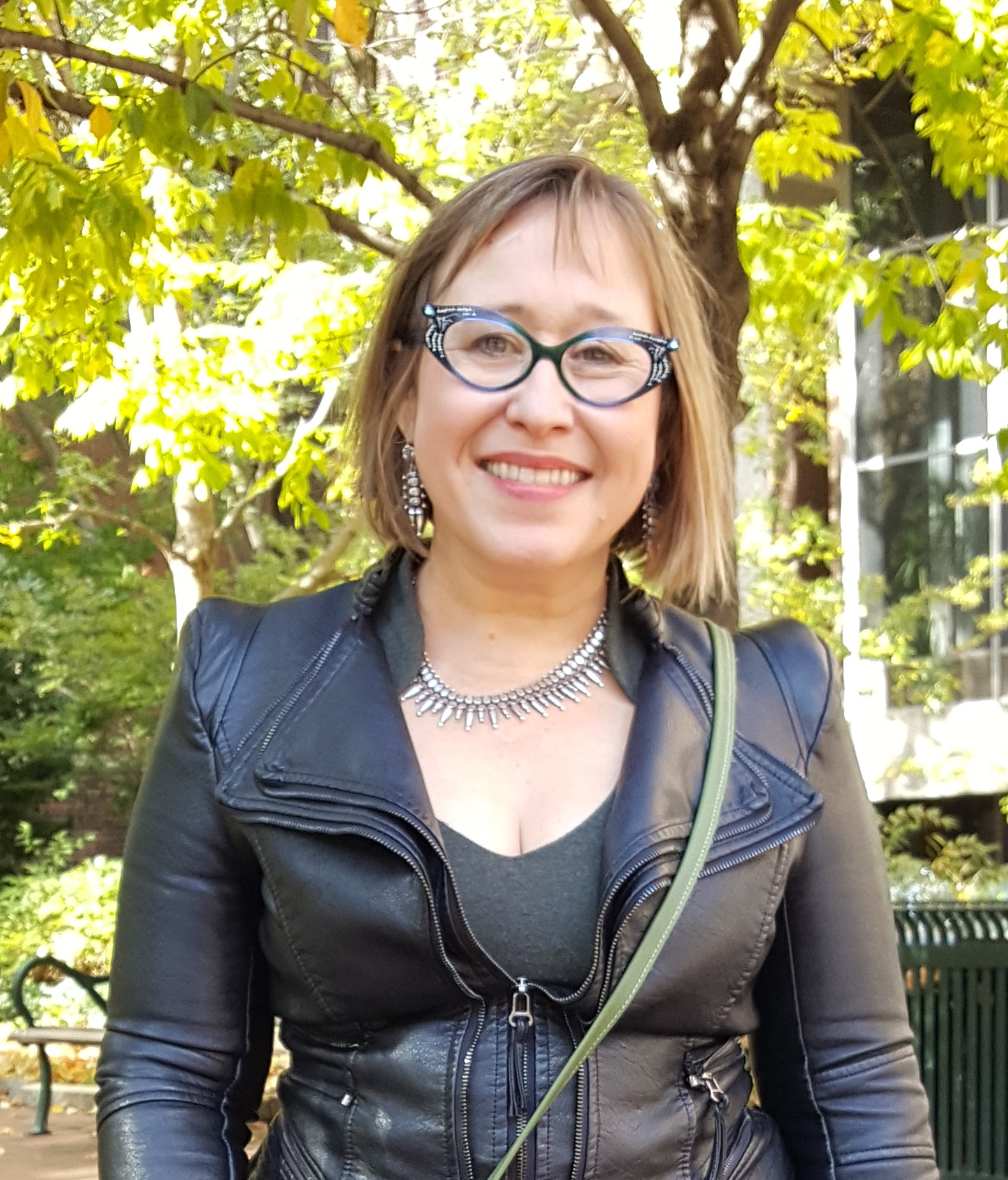
Heather J. Sharkey

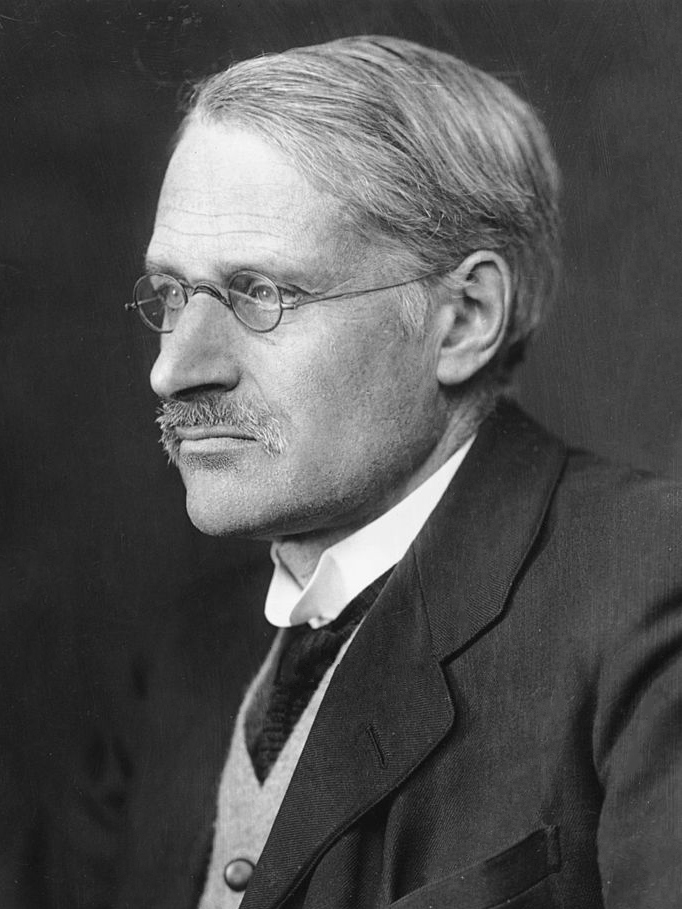
G. M. Trevelyan

- Michael Aris (St Cuthbert's) – Author on Bhutanese, Tibetan and Himalayan culture and Buddhism; Lecturer in Asian history at St John's College, Oxford and later at St Antony's College, Oxford
- Anthony A. Barrett (King's) – Distinguished university scholar at the University of British Columbia
- Jeremy Black – Professor of History at the University of Exeter; Samuel Eliot Morison Prize (2008)
- Richard Britnell – Emeritus Professor of History at Durham University; The Commercialisation of English Society, 1000-1500 (1993)
- Bertram Colgrave (Hatfield) – Reader in English at Durham University; Editor of Early English Manuscripts in Facsimile
- Anthony Crichton-Stuart (St Chad's) – Head of Old Master Paintings at Christie's, New York
- Robin Donkin (King's) – Reader in Historical Geography at Cambridge University (1990–1996)
- Jo Fox – Director of the Institute of Historical Research
- Roy Martin Haines (St Chad's) – Professor of Medieval History at Dalhousie University
- James Holland (St Chad's) – Popular historian, author of books on World War II
- Jean Hood – Author of various books on maritime history
- Clare Hunter – writer and artist
- Liz James (Van Mildert) – Professor of the History of Art at the University of Sussex
- Judith Jesch (St Aidan's) – Professor of Viking Studies at the University of Nottingham
- Clifford Kinvig (St Cuthbert's) – Senior Lecturer in War Studies at RMA Sandhurst
- Deborah Lavin – Principal of Trevelyan College (1979–95)
- Dominic Montserrat (Grey) – British egyptologist and papyrologist; Sex and Society in Graeco-Roman Egypt (1996)
- Jack Ogden – Visiting Professor of Ancient Jewellery, Material and Technology at Birmingham City University; President of the Society of Jewellery Historians (since 2018)
- George Ornsby (University) – Antiquarian; editor with the Surtees Society
- Keith Pratt (University) – Emeritus Professor of East Asian Studies at Durham University
- David Reeder (Hatfield) – Lecturer in Urban History, University of Leicester
- Nicholas Reeves (Van Mildert) – Egyptologist; Director of the Amarna Royal Tombs Project (1998–2002)
- Gay Robins (St Aidan's) – Samuel Candler Dobbs Professor of Art History at Emory University (2003–2018)
- James Rutherford (Armstrong) – Chair of History at University of Auckland (1934–63)
- Alec Ryrie – Professor of the History of Christianity at Durham University; Gresham Professor of Divinity (2018–2022)
- Alan Schom (Hatfield) – Biographer of Napoleon and Napoleon III
- Heather J. Sharkey (Grad Soc) – Professor of Middle Eastern and Islamic Studies at University of Pennsylvania
- Peter Snowdon (University) – specialist in contemporary British political history; contributor to Parliamentary Brief
- John Steele (University) – Professor of the History of the Exact Sciences in Antiquity and Wilbour Professor of Egyptology and Assyriology at Brown University
- Joanna Story (Trevelyan) – Professor of Early Medieval History at the University of Leiecester
- Michael Swanton (St Cuthbert's) – Emeritus Professor of Medieval History at Exeter University
- George Macaulay Trevelyan – Scholar of political history and Chancellor of Durham University (1950–57)
- Andy Wood – Professor of Social History at Durham University
- Benjamin Woolley (St Cuthbert's) – historian and biographer; The King's Assassin: The Secret Plot to Murder King James I (2018)
- Julian Wright – Professor of History at Northumbria University; co-editor of French History

=== Language and Literature academics ===
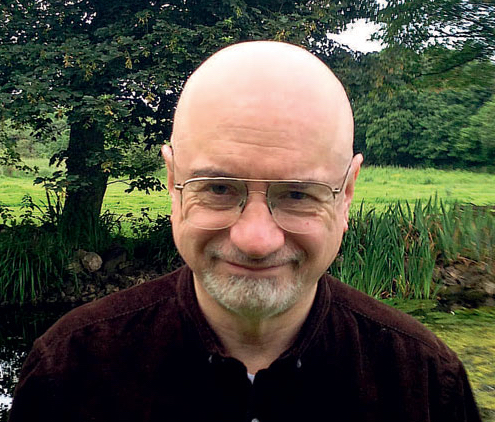
Mikhail Epstein

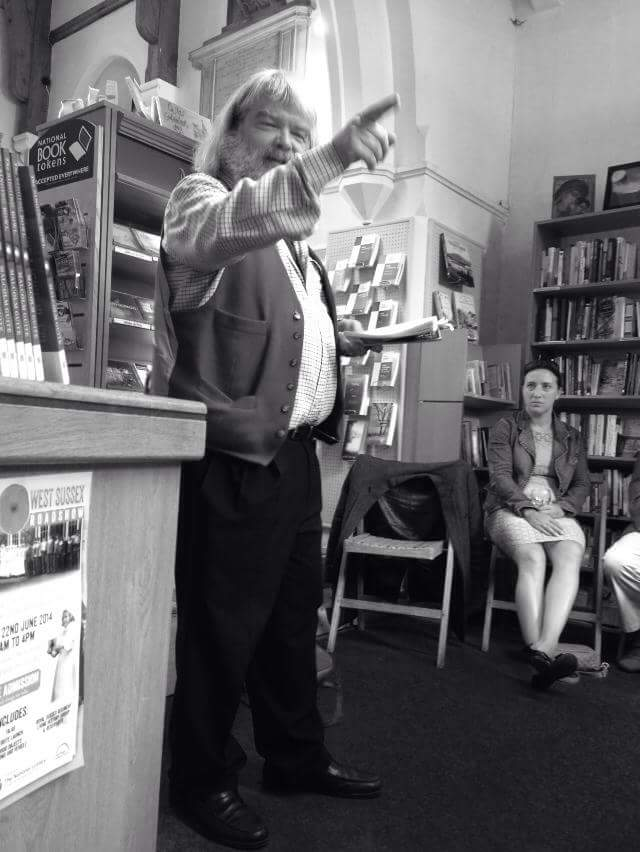
Malcolm Guite

- Kenneth Allott (Armstrong) – Kenneth Muir Professor of English at Liverpool University
- Thomas Blackburn (Hatfield) – Lecturer at College of St. Mark and St. John
- Philip Bullock – Professor of Russian Literature and Music at the University of Oxford
- Seán Burke – Reader in English at Durham University
- Paul Edwards (Hatfield) – Professor of English and African Literature at the University of Edinburgh
- Mikhail Epstein – Anglo-American and Russian literary theorist; Director of the Centre for Humanities Innovation at Durham University
- Ruth Etchells – Principal of St John's College, Durham (1979–88)
- Gary Ferguson (St Chad's) – Douglas Huntly Gordon Distinguished Professor of French at the University of Virginia
- Clifford Nelson Fyle (Hatfield) - Sierra Leonean Professor of English; wrote lyrics to the Sierra Leone National Anthem
- Eldred D. Jones – literary critic from Sierra Leone
- Malcolm Guite – author, poet (Sounding the Seasons, The Singing Bowl), priest, and singer-songwriter; current Bye-Fellow and Chaplain of Girton College, Cambridge
- Maebh Long – Irish academic, known for writings on the novelist and playwright Brian O'Nolan
- Margaret Masson – Lecturer in English, Principal of St Chad's College (2016–present)
- Patrick O'Meara – Professor of Russian and Russian history; Master of Van Mildert College (2004–11)
- John Robert O'Toole - Professorial fellow at the University of Melbourne
- Ann Moss – Professor of French at Durham University (1996–2003)
- Harold Orton (Hatfield) – Professor of English Language and Medieval English Literature, University of Leeds (1946–64)
- Jennifer Smith - FRSE Professor of Sociolinguistics, University of Glasgow
- Ida C. Ward (St Mary's) – Professor of Linguistics, known for work on African languages

=== Life scientists ===
Entries defined as having backgrounds in Biology and its various sub-disciplines e.g. Botany, Ecology, Neuroscience, Pathology etc.

- David Barker – Emeritus Professor of Zoology
- David Bellamy – Lecturer in Botany; President of The Wildlife Trusts (1995–2005)
- Kathleen Bever Blackburn (Armstrong) – botanist
- David Holden (University) – Emeritus Professor of Infectious Disease at Imperial College London
- John Lawton FRS – RSPB Vice President; previously head of Natural Environment Research Council; the last chair of the Royal Commission on Environmental Pollution
- Marie Lebour – marine biologist
- Simon Parson – Regius Professor of Anatomy at University of Aberdeen (since 2018); President of the Anatomical Society (since 2019)
- Joe Smartt (Hatfield) – Reader in biology at Southampton University (1990–1996)
- Mark A. Smith (Hatfield) – Professor of pathology at Case Western Reserve University
- David H. Valentine - Head of Department of Botany from 1945 as reader, then from 1950 as professor. Subsequently, at University of Manchester
- Stan Woodell (Hatfield) – Lecturer in botany at Oxford University (1959–1988); Emeritus Fellow of Wolfson College, Oxford (1989–2004)
- Adrian Woodruffe-Peacock (Hatfield) – Ecologist; contributor to the Journal of Ecology

=== Philosophers and Theologians ===
(See § Religion for theologians better known for their ordained ministry)

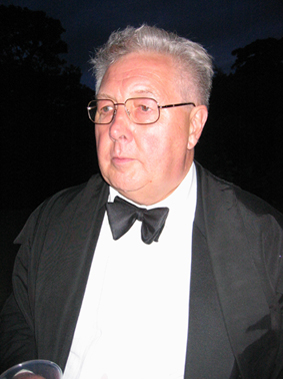
Douglas Davies

- Lewis Ayres – Professor of Catholic and Historical Theology at Durham University; Bede Chair of Catholic Theology (2009–2013)
- Charles Kingsley Barrett – Professor of Divinity at Durham University (1958–1982)
- Joan Bernard – Principal of Trevelyan College (1966–1978)
- Stephen R. L. Clark – Emeritus Professor of Philosophy at the University of Liverpool
- Dan Cohn-Sherbok – Emeritus Professor of Judaism at the University of Wales
- David E. Cooper – Emeritus Professor of Philosophy at Durham University
- Douglas Davies (St John's) – Professor in the Study of Religion at Durham
- James Dunn – Lightfoot Professor of Divinity at Durham University (1990–2003)
- Christopher Evans – Lightfoot Professor of Divinity (1959–1962)
- Stanley Eveling – Professor of Moral Philosophy at Edinburgh University
- Simon J. Gathercole (Hatfield) – Reader in New Testament Studies and Director of Studies at Fitzwilliam College, Cambridge
- David Jasper (Hatfield and St Chad's) – Professor of Theology and Literature at the University of Glasgow
- R. W. L. Moberly – Professor of Theology and Biblical Interpretation at Durham University
- Tim Crane - Former Knightbridge Professor of Philosophy at the University of Cambridge

=== Physicians and Psychiatrists ===
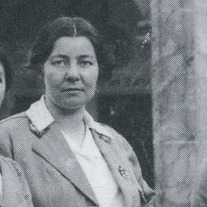
Ruth Nicholson

Claude Nelson-Williams

- Ephraim Anderson FRS – bacteriologist known for his research on plasmids
- Francis Arthur Bainbridge FRS – Professor of Physiology at Durham University (1911–1915), later chair of physiology at St. Bartholomew's Hospital
- George Stewardson Brady FRS (College of Medicine) – Professor of Natural History at the Hancock Museum (1875–1906)
- John Charles – Chief Medical Office (1950–1960)
- Thomas Dutton – dietitian and opponent of teetotalism
- Reginald Hall – endocrinologist known for his research on the thyroid gland
- William Edmund Hick – President of the Experimental Psychology Society (1958–1959)
- Tom Main – doctor, psychiatrist and psychoanalyst, coined the term Therapeutic community
- Flora Murray – doctor and suffragist, founder of Women's Hospital for Children
- Claude Nelson-Williams - physician, politician, and one-time president of the Sierra Leone Medical Association
- Ruth Nicholson – obstetrician and gynaecologist
- Thomas Horrocks Openshaw – Victorian surgeon and recipient of a Jack the Ripper letter
- Joseph Stoddart FRS – Consultant anaesthetist at Royal Victoria Infirmary, influenced the development of Intensive Care in the UK
- John Walton, Baron Walton of Detchant – former President of British Medical Association, General Medical Council and the Royal Society of Medicine

=== Sociologists and Social Anthropologists ===
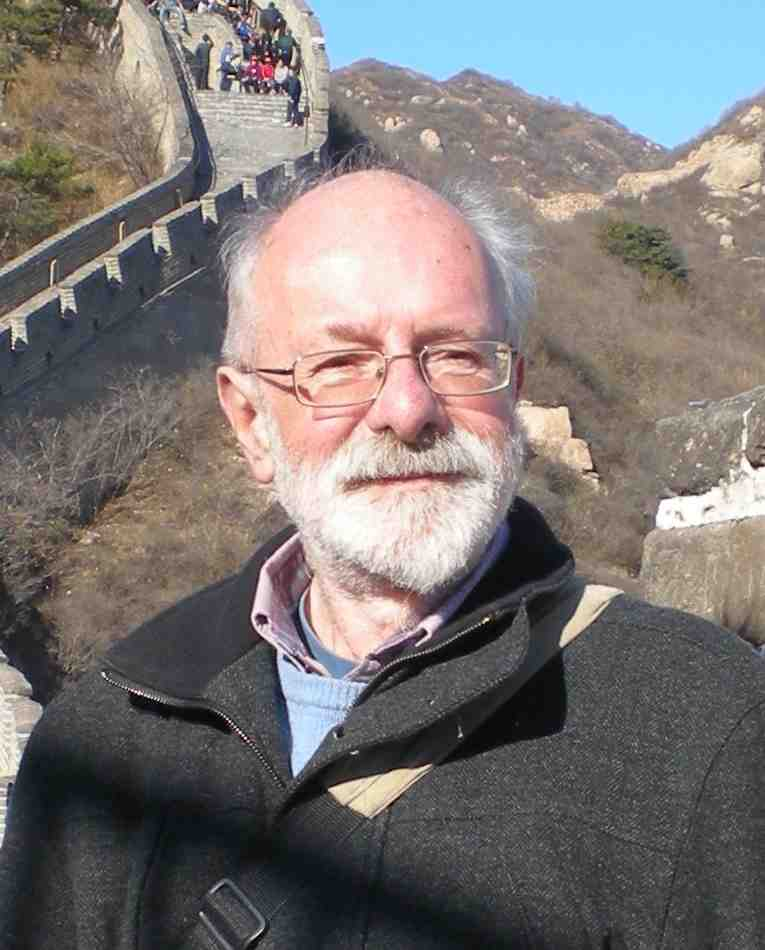
Robert Hugh Layton

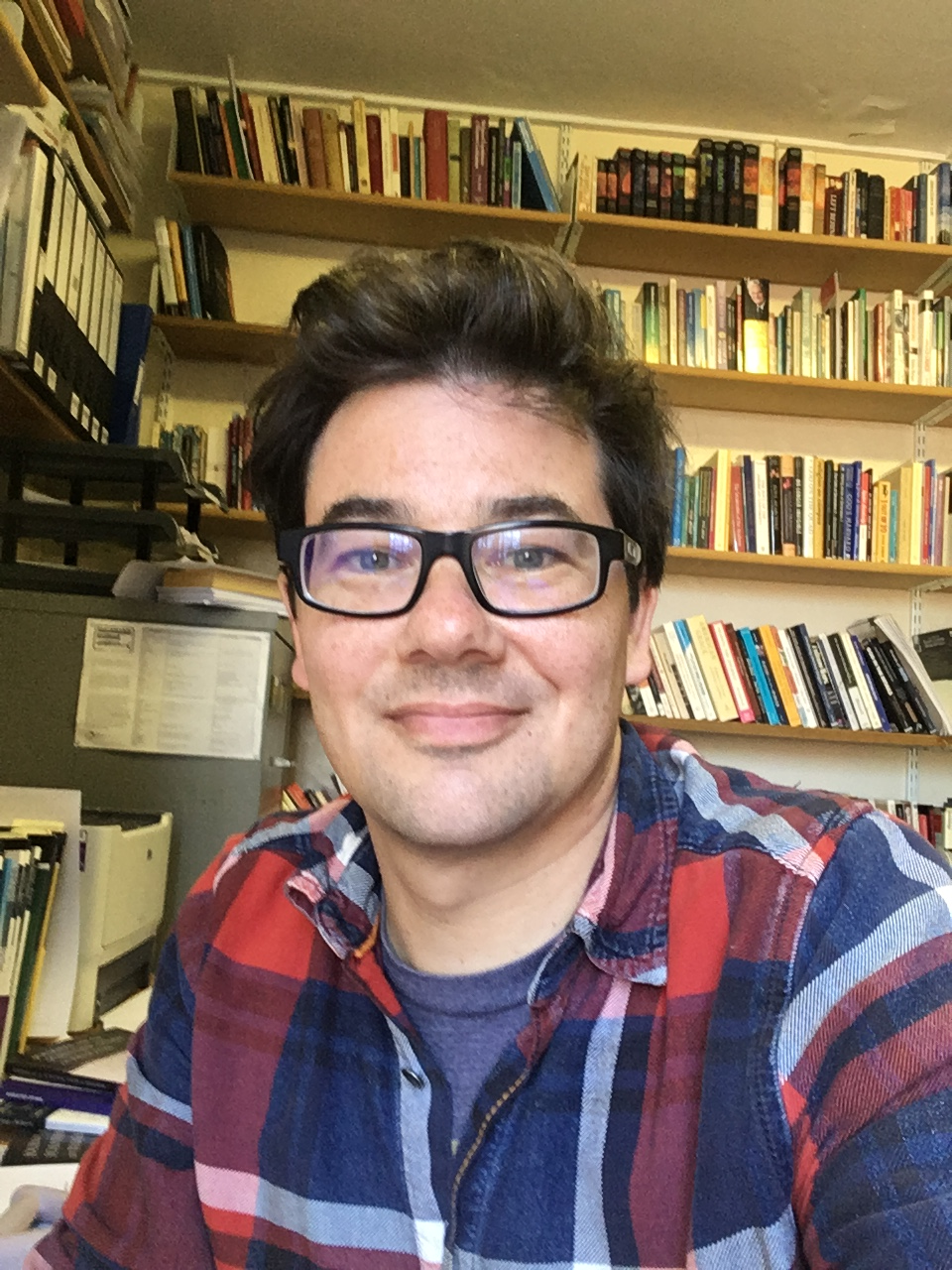
Mathew Guest

- Gëzim Alpion (Grad Soc) – Lecturer in Sociology at University of Birmingham
- Robert Burgess (Bede) – President of the British Sociological Association (1989–1991)
- Stanley Cohen – Emeritus Professor of Sociology at the London School of Economics
- Iain R. Edgar (Grad Soc) – Senior Lecturer in Social Anthropology at Durham University
- Mathew Guest - Professor of Sociology of Religion at Durham University
- Robert Hugh Layton – Emeritus Professor of Anthropology at Durham University
- Tariq Modood (St Cuthbert's) – Professor of Sociology, Politics and Public Policy at the University of Bristol (1997-); co-founder of the journal Ethnicities
- Henrietta Moore (Trevelyan) – William Wyse Professor of Social Anthropology (2008-2014)
- Caroline Moser (St Mary's) – Emeritus Professor of Urban Development at University of Manchester; Senior Fellow, Brookings Institution (2004–2007)
- Sue Scott – Visiting Professor at the University of Newcastle; President of the British Sociological Association (2007–2009)
- Ian Taylor (Hatfield) – Professor of Sociology at Salford University (1989–1998); Principal of Van Mildert College (1999–2000)
- Alan Warde (Grad Soc) – Professor of Sociology at Manchester University (1999-)
- Frank Webster (St Cuthbert's) – Head of the Department of Sociology at City University London (2008–2012); Theories of the Information Society (1995)

=== Other academics ===
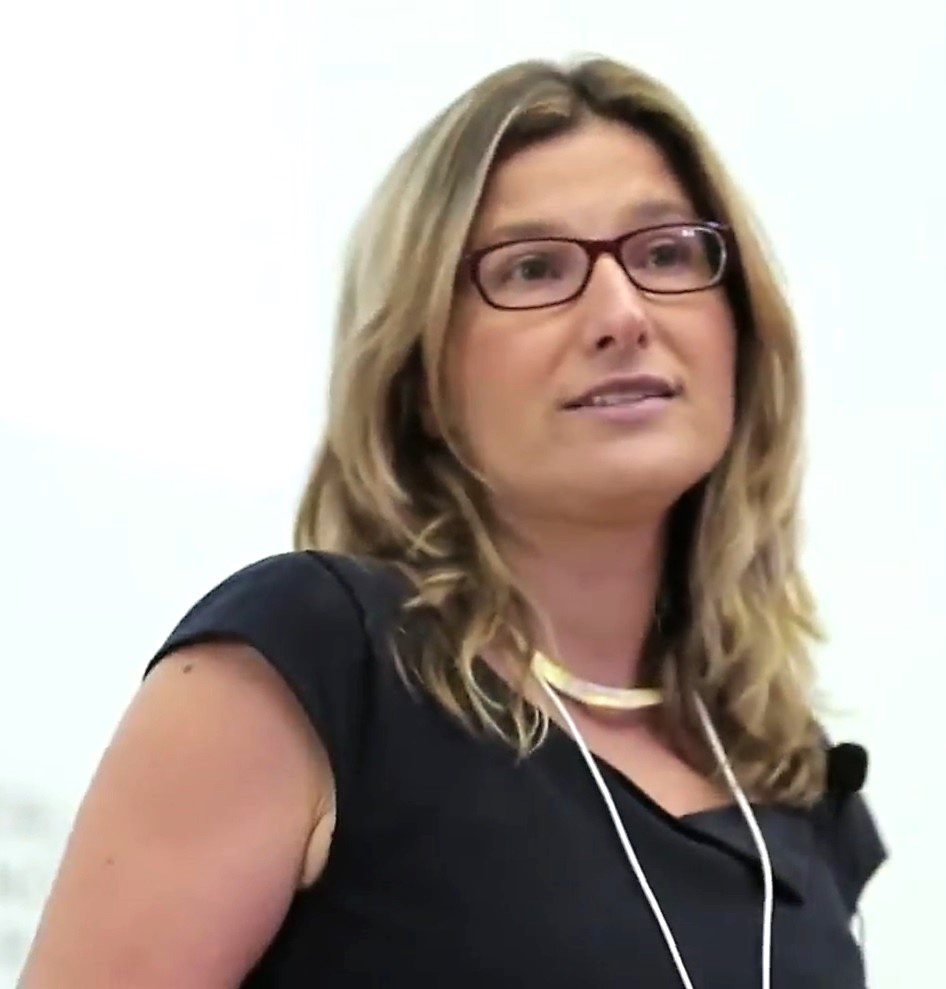
Aikaterini Fotopoulou

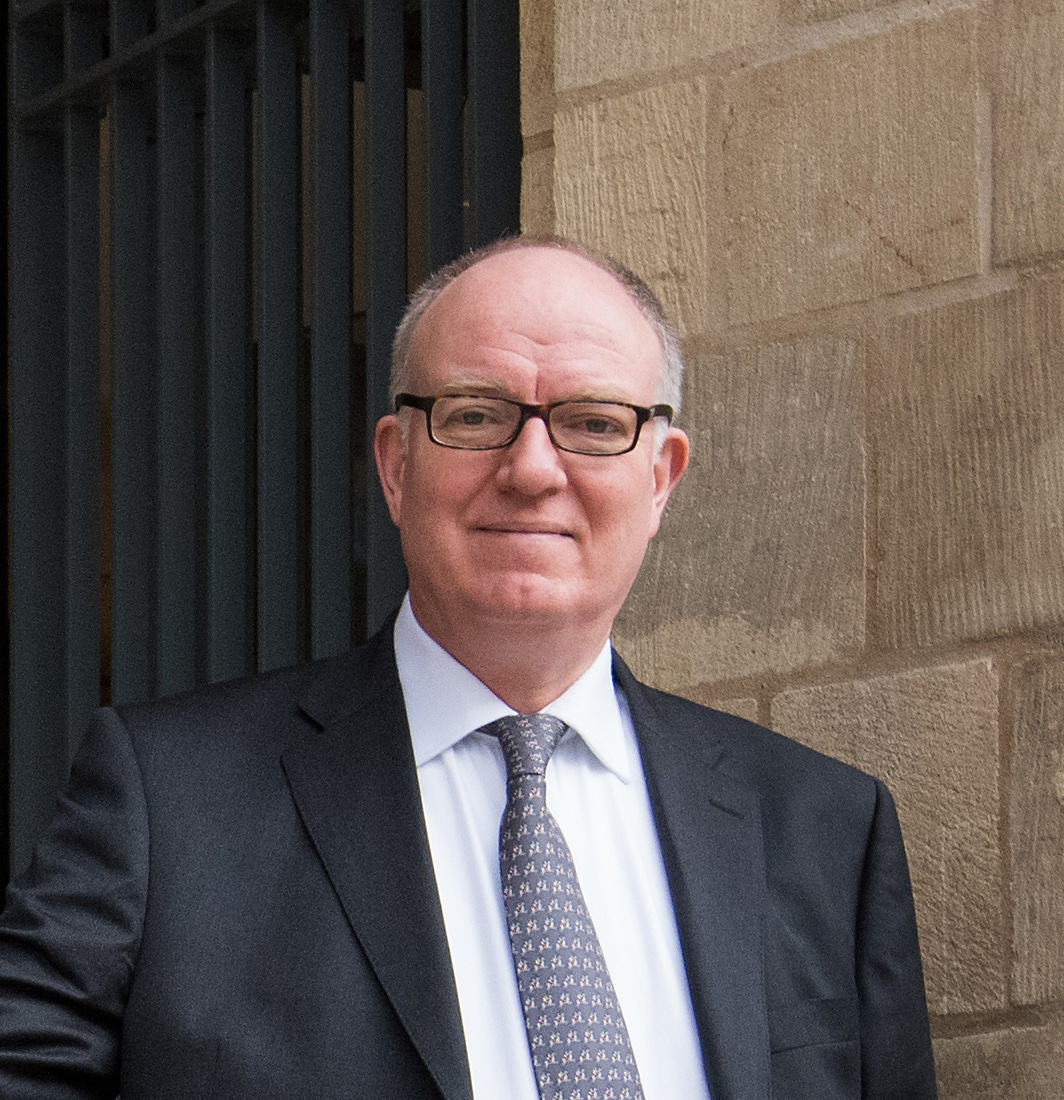
Richard Ovenden

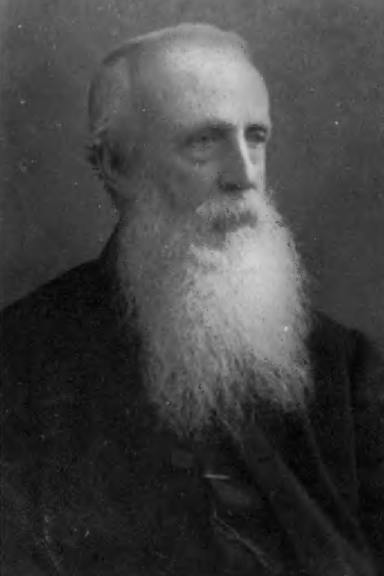
Octavius Pickard-Cambridge

- Michael Alcorn – Director of the School of Music and Sonic Arts at Queen's University, Belfast
- Robert Allison – Vice-Chancellor of Loughborough University from 2012
- Roy Ascott (King's) – Founder and President of the Planetary Collegium at Plymouth University (2003–present)
- Tim Blackman (University) – Vice-Chancellor of the University of Middlesex
- Ernest Bullock – Gardiner Professor of Music at the University of Glasgow and Principal of the Scottish National Academy of Music (1941–1952); Director of the Royal College of Music (1953–1960)
- Kenneth Calman – Vice-Chancellor of Durham University (1998–2006); Chancellor of the University of Glasgow (2006–present)
- Anne Campbell – Professor of Psychology at Durham University
- John Casken – Professor of Music at the University of Manchester (1992–2008)
- Joe Elliott (Hild Bede) – Principal of Collingwood College (2011–present) and Professor of Education at Durham (2004–present)
- Peter Evans (St Cuthbert's) – Professor of Music at Southampton University (1961–1990)
- Aikaterini Fotopoulou – Professor of Psychodynamic Neuroscience at University College London
- Robert Michael Franklin, Jr. – President of Morehouse College (2007–2012)
- Chris Higgins (Grey) – Vice Chancellor of Durham University (2007–2014)
- George Wilberforce Kakoma – Professor of music, composer of Uganda's national anthem
- Richard Ovenden (St Chad's) – Deputy Director and Head of Special Collections at the Bodleian Library
- Hugh Pearman (St Chad's) – architecture and design critic of The Sunday Times (1986–2016)
- Octavius Pickard-Cambridge FRS (University) – Clergyman and arachnologist
- Frank Rhodes – President of Cornell University (1977–1995)
- Akilagpa Sawyerr – Vice-Chancellor of the University of Ghana (1985–1992)
- Charles Thorp FRS – Warden of the University
- Peter Ustinov – Chancellor of the University of Durham (1992–2004)
- Paul Wellings (Grad Soc) – Vice-Chancellor of Lancaster University (2002–2012)
- Ted Wragg (Hatfield) – Professor of Education at the University of Exeter (1978–2003)
- Zu'bi M.F. Al-Zu'bi (Ustinov) - Pro Vice-Chancellor at the University of Jordan (2013–2017); Director of Development at the University of Sydney

== Business people ==
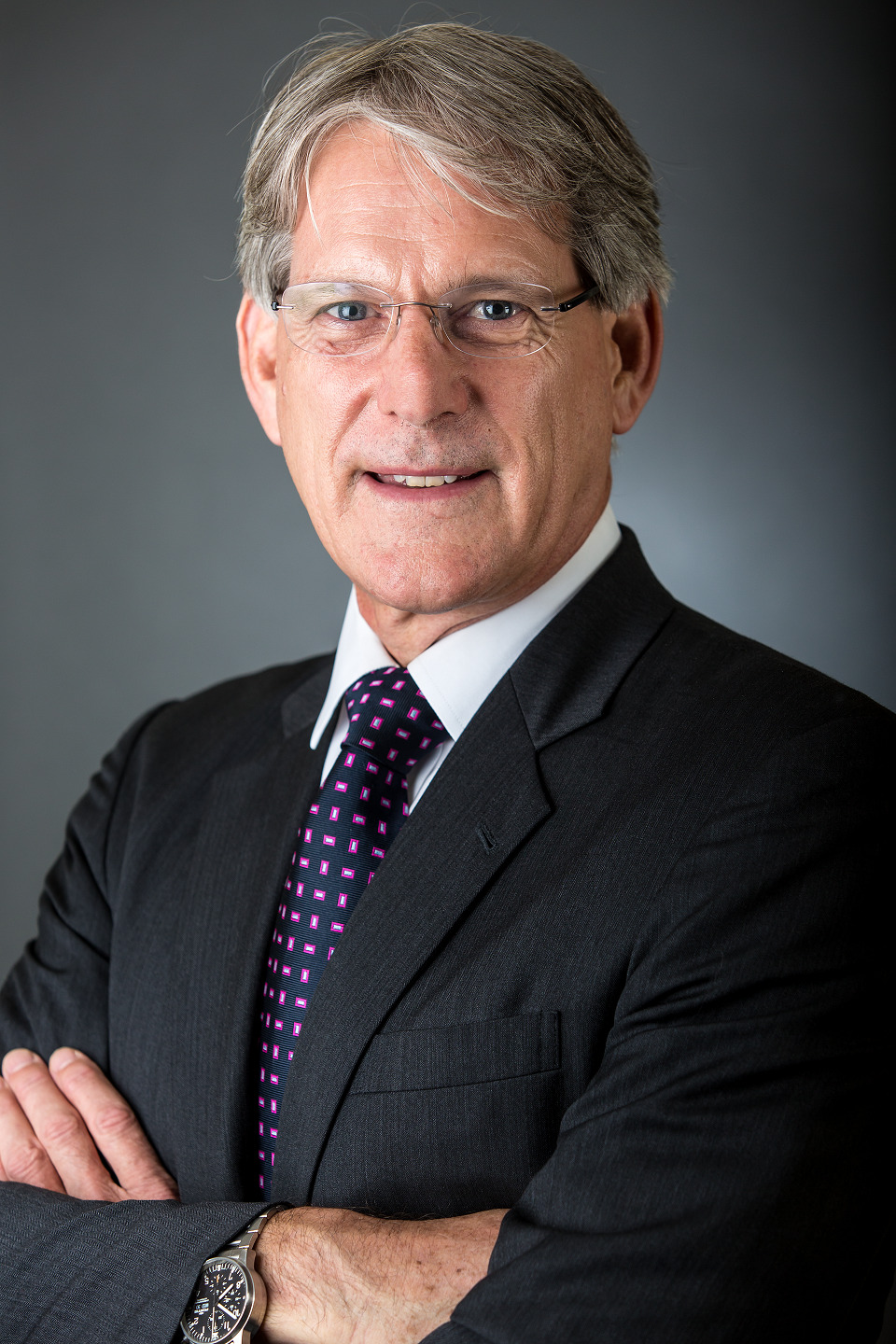
Patrick Allman-Ward

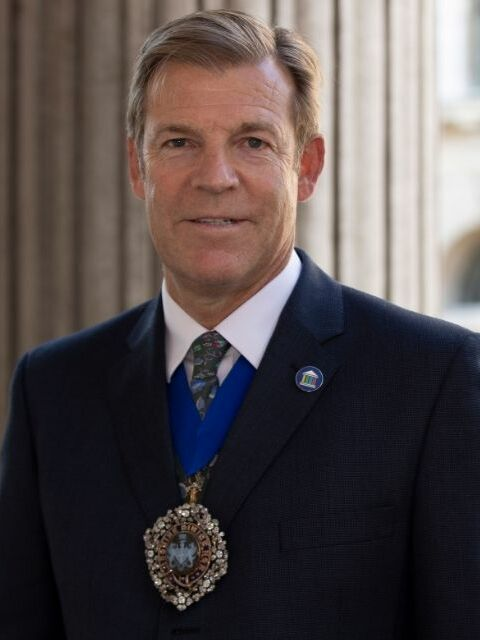
William Russell

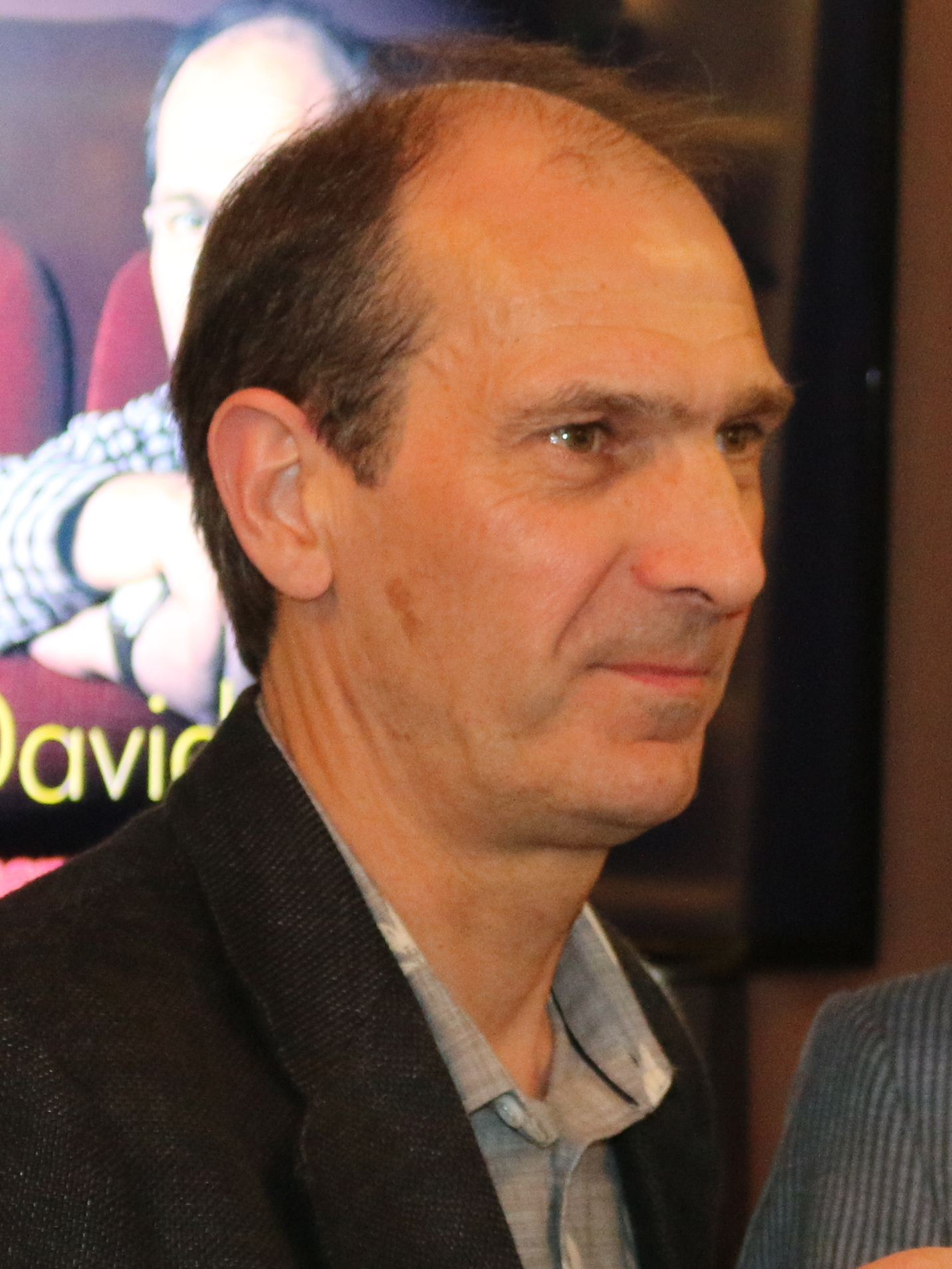
David Sproxton

- Richard Adams (St John's) – pioneer of Fair Trade and founder of Traidcraft
- Patrick Allman-Ward (Collingwood) – CEO of Dana Gas (2013–2023)
- Adam Applegarth (Grey) – CEO of Northern Rock bank (2001–07)
- David Arkless (Hatfield) – former president, CDI Corporation
- James Averdieck (Hild Bede) – entrepreneur known for dessert brand Gü
- Jonathan Beckett (Hatfield) – Chief Executive of Burgess Yachts
- John Cadman, 1st Baron Cadman – Chairman of the Anglo-Persian Oil Company
- Cecil Chao – Chairman and owner of Cheuk Nang Holdings
- Edwin Davies – businessman and philanthropist
- Steve Easterbrook (St Chad's) – CEO of McDonald's
- Ron Emerson (Grad Soc) – founding Chairman of the British Business Bank
- Leslie Ferrar (St Mary's) – Treasurer to Charles III
- George Guise (Hatfield) – gold-mining executive and policy adviser to Margaret Thatcher (1986–1990)
- James Hoffmann – co-founder of Square Mile Coffee Roasters and World Barista Champion
- John Henry Holmes (College of Physical Science) – inventor of the light switch
- Tom Hume (King's) – first Director of the Museum of London
- Herbert Loebl (King's) – co-founder of Joyce, Loebl & Company
- John Laurent Giles – yacht designer
- Sir Robert Malpas (King's) – engineer and industrialist
- Lady Edward Manners – manager of Haddon Hall and founder of Beau Bra Lingerie Company
- Ian Marchant (Hatfield) – CEO of SSE plc
- Sir Peter Ogden (University) – co-founder of Computacenter
- Peter Owen Edmunds (Hatfield) – telecoms entrepreneur, co-founder of Peterstar
- Richard Paniguian (Hatfield) – former vice-president, BP
- Richard Pease (Hatfield) – fund manager
- Tom Riall (St Cuthbert's) – executive chair of Mydentist
- Alison Rose (St Aidan's) – former CEO of NatWest Group
- William Russell (Grey) – former Merrill Lynch banker; 692nd Lord Mayor of London (2019–2021)
- Nick Scheele (St Cuthbert's) – president and COO of the Ford Motor Company
- David Sproxton (Collingwood) – co-founder of Aardman Animations
- Edi Truell (Collingwood) – co-founder of private equity group Disruptive Capital
- Stephen Welton (Hatfield) – Chair of the British Business Bank (2023–)

== Judges and lawyers ==
=== Judges of the Supreme Court of the United Kingdom ===
Name	College	Notes	Ref.
Anthony Hughes, Lord Hughes of Ombersley	Van Mildert	Justice of the Supreme Court of the United Kingdom (2013–2018); Vice President of the Criminal Division of the Court of Appeal (2009–2013); Lord Justice of Appeal (2006–2013)	
Jill Black, Lady Black of Derwent	Trevelyan	Justice of the Supreme Court of the United Kingdom (2017–); Lady Justice of Appeal (2010–2017)	

=== Senators of the College of Justice ===
Name	College	Notes	Ref.
Robert Weir, Lord Weir	?	Senator of the College of Justice (2020–); Sheriff of the Edinburgh Sheriff Court (2018–2020)	

=== Judges of the High Court of Justice ===
Name	College	Notes	Ref.
James Goss	University	Justice of the High Court (Queen's Bench) (2014–)	
David Maddison	Grey	Justice of the High Court (Queen's Bench) (2008–2013)	
Andrew McFarlane	Collingwood	Justice of the High Court (2006–2011); Lord Justice of Appeal (2011–2018); President of the Family Division (2018–)	
Finola O'Farrell	Trevelyan	Justice of the High Court (Queen's Bench) (2016–)	
Caroline Swift	St Aidan's	Justice of the High Court (Queen's Bench) (2005–2015)	
Mark Waller	King's	Justice of the High Court (1989–1996); Lord Justice of Appeal (1996–2010); Intelligence Services Commissioner (2011–2016)	
Sonia Harris	University	Justice of the High Court (Family Division) (2024-)	

=== Judges of the International Court of Justice ===
Name	College	Notes	Ref.
Dapo Akande	Staff	Elected a judge of the International Court of Justice 2026; lecturer in Durham Law School 2000–2004	

=== Judges in other countries ===
Name	College	Notes	Ref.
St John Branch	Codrington	Chief Justice of Jamaica (1923–1925); Chief Justice of Sri Lanka (1925–1926)	
Henry Joko-Smart	Fourah Bay	Justice of the Supreme Court of Sierra Leone (1998–2005)	
Kobina Arku Korsah	Fourah Bay	Chief Justice of the Gold Coast (1956–1957); Chief Justice of Ghana (1957–1963)	
George Lamptey	King's	Justice of the Supreme Court of Ghana (2000–2002)	
Koi Larbi	Fourah Bay	Justice of the Supreme Court of Ghana (1970–1972)	
Andrew Macrae	St John's	Vice President of the Court of Appeal of Hong Kong (2018–); Justice of Appeal of the Court of Appeal of Hong Kong (2013–)	
Albert Earnshaw	University	Judge of the Supreme Court of the Straits Settlements (1914–1920); acting Chief Justice, British Guiana (1913)	

=== Lawyers ===
Name	College	Notes	Ref.
George Gretton	Hatfield	Commissioner of the Scottish Law Commission (2006–2011)	
Jolyon Maugham QC	Hatfield	Barrister at Devereux Chambers; Founder of Good Law Project	

== Broadcasters and entertainers ==
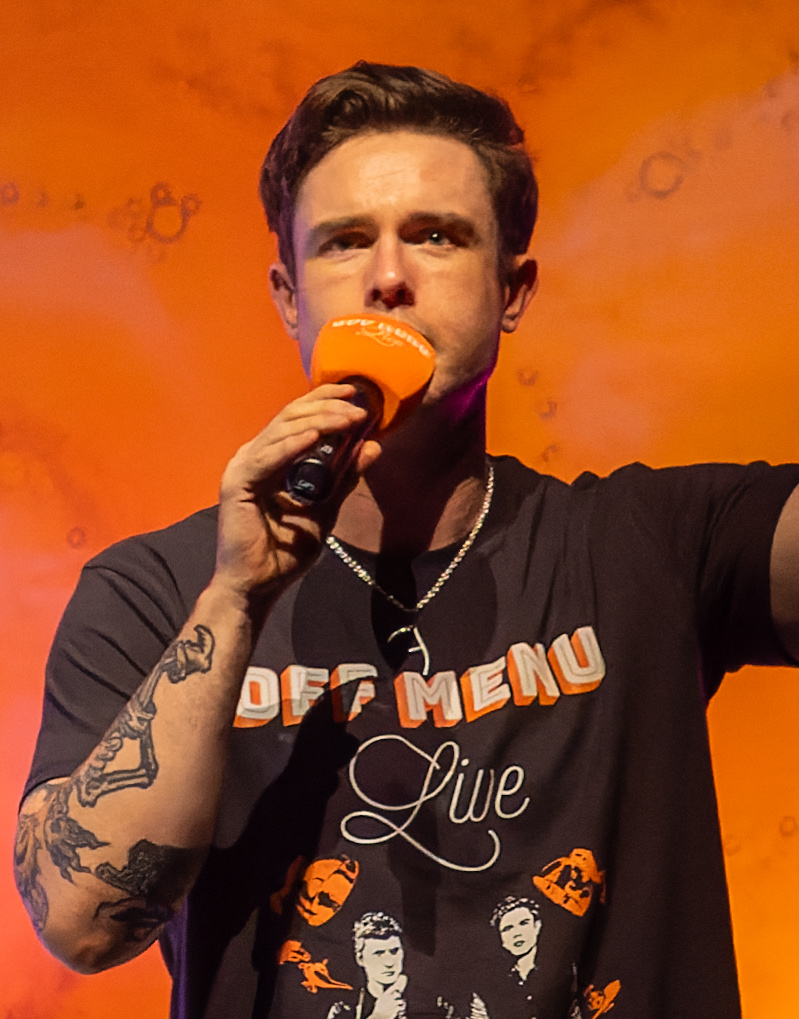
Ed Gamble

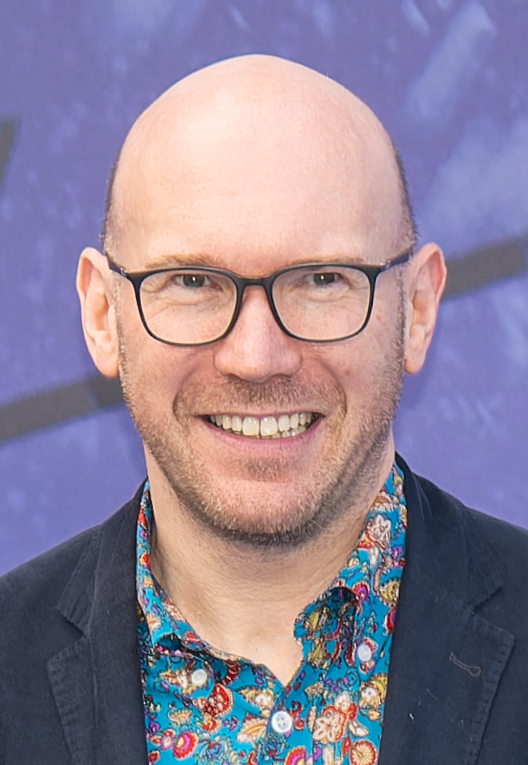
Alex Macqueen

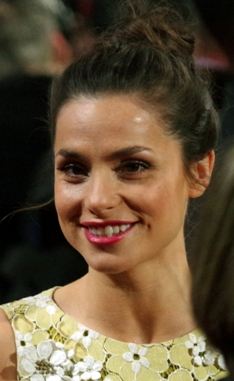
Charlotte Riley

=== Actors and comedians ===
- Delaval Astley, 23rd Baron Hastings (Hatfield) – actor, The Archers
- Arthur Bostrom (St Chad's) – played Officer Crabtree in 'Allo 'Allo!
- Andrew Buchan (St Cuthbert's) – All the Money in the World (2017)
- James Cary (Hatfield) – TV and radio comedy writer, Think the Unthinkable and Bluestone 42
- Daniel Casey (Grey) – co-star of Midsomer Murders
- Mark Cooper-Jones (Van Mildert) – YouTuber, comedian and author
- Tim FitzHigham (St Chad's) – comedian, actor and record-breaker
- Ed Gamble (Hatfield) – presenter and performer, The Peacock and Gamble Podcast and Mock the Week
- Ian Hogg (St John's) – played lead role in Rockliffe
- Nathan Kiley – stage actor
- Liz Kingsman – comedian and actress, Parlement and I, Jack Wright
- Nish Kumar (Grey) – stand-up and host, The Mash Report
- Alex Macqueen (Collingwood) – The Thick of It and The Inbetweeners
- Stevie Martin (St John's) – comedian and podcast host, Nobody Panic
- Ambika Mod (St Mary's) – This Is Going to Hurt and One Day
- Nick Mohammed (St Aidan's) – comedian and actor
- Naz Osmanoglu (Van Mildert) – stand-up and former So You Think You're Funny runner-up
- Adam Rayner (St Chad's) – actor, Tyrant
- Charlotte Riley (St Cuthbert's) – actress
- Patrick Ryecart (Bede) – film and stage actor
- John Schwab (Hild Bede) – actor and voice artist
- Lily Travers – actress, Viceroy's House
- Jenny Walser (University) – actress, Heartstopper
- James Wilby (Grey) – film, television and theatre actor known for Maurice and Howards End
- Christina Wolfe (Van Mildert) – actress, The Royals
- Fenella Woolgar (St Mary's) – actress, Bright Young Things (2003)

=== Correspondents and Presenters ===
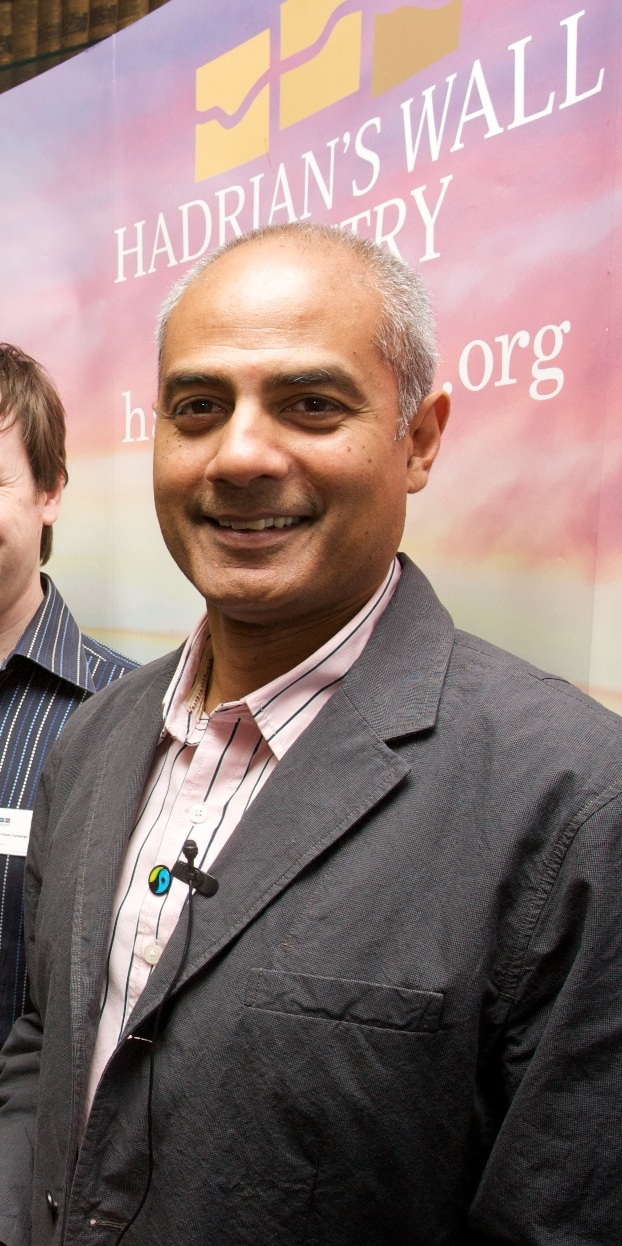
George Alagiah

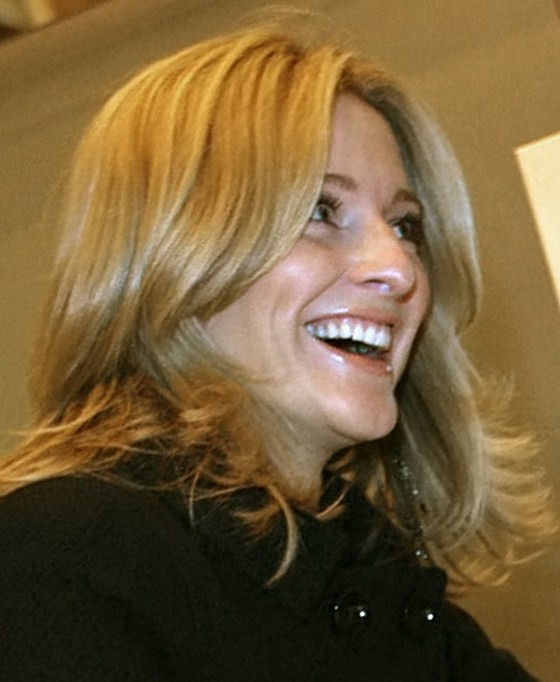
Gabby Logan

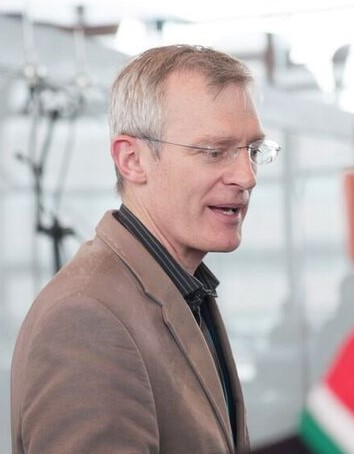
Jeremy Vine

- George Alagiah (Van Mildert) – broadcaster; BBC TV News at Six since 2003
- Matthew Amroliwala (St Chad's) – BBC news presenter
- Guy de la Bédoyère (Collingwood) – British historian and broadcaster, Time Team
- Lucy Beresford (Trevelyan) – broadcaster, host of #MindOverMatterMondays and agony aunt on This Morning
- Lionel Blue – rabbi, broadcaster, author; Honorary Doctor of Divinity and Fellow at Grey College
- Allan Cartner (University) – Continuity announcer, Border Television
- Mark Durden-Smith (Hatfield) – Channel 5 sports presenter
- Jonny Dymond (Hild Bede) – BBC Royal Correspondent (2017–)
- Jonathan Gould (Hatfield) – Channel 5 television presenter of MLB on Five (1997–2008)
- Judith Hann (St Aidan's) – freelance broadcaster and writer, former Tomorrow's World presenter
- Gavin Hewitt (St John's) – Special Correspondent for BBC News
- Chris Hollins (Hild Bede) – broadcaster, sports presenter for BBC Breakfast
- Nina Hossain (St Cuthbert's) – broadcast journalist
- Catherine Jacob (Grey) – Sky News journalist
- Gabby Logan (Hild Bede) – TV presenter
- Dominic Montserrat (Grey) – TV Egyptologist
- Rory Morrison (University) – BBC Radio 4 newsreader and continuity announcer
- Maryam Nemazee – Bloomberg presenter
- Kjartan Poskitt (Collingwood) – TV presenter and author
- Mark Pougatch (Hatfield) – BBC sports presenter and radio host
- Jonny Saunders (Collingwood) – BBC Radio 2 Sports Presenter
- David Shukman (Hatfield) – BBC correspondent
- Gareth Sibson (University) – writer and broadcaster
- Kate Silverton (St Cuthbert's) – Broadcast journalist
- Bill Steel – presenter and announcer, Tyne Tees Television
- Jeremy Vine (Hatfield) – BBC radio and television presenter
- Tim Willcox (St Chad's) – BBC television presenter

=== Directors and Producers ===
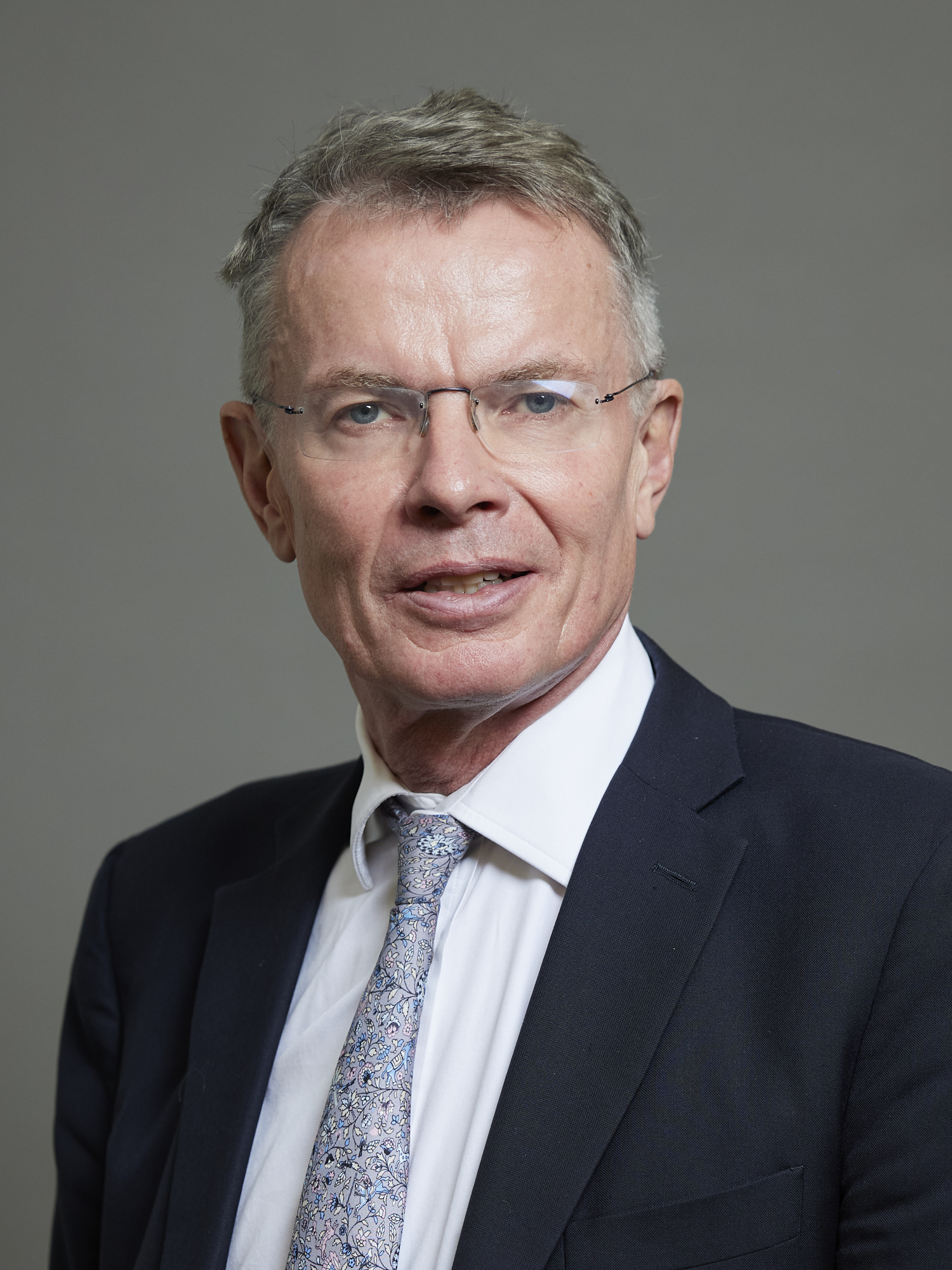
Viscount Colville

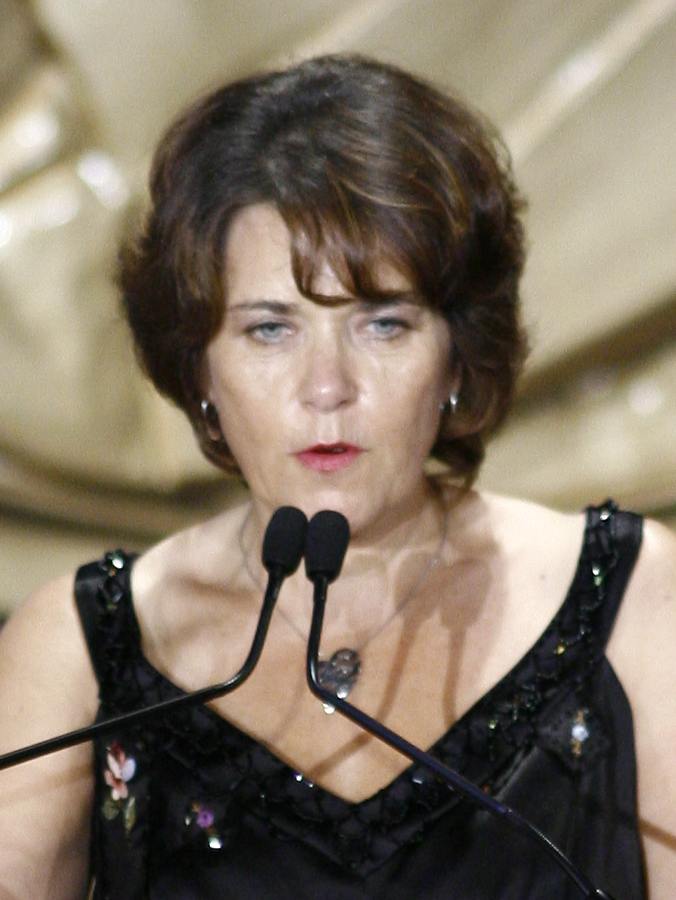
Lorraine Heggessey

- George Auckland (Hatfield) – longtime BBC television and digital media executive
- Simon Ardizzone (University) – film editor and producer, Hacking Democracy (2006)
- Biddy Baxter (St Mary's) – TV producer (Blue Peter) and inventor of the Blue Peter badge
- Jamie Campbell (St John's) – documentary filmmaker and producer, 24 Hours with...
- Jonny Campbell (Van Mildert) – film and television director, Alien Autopsy (2006)
- Charles Mark Townshend Colville (St Chad's) – 5th Viscount Colville of Culross, BBC producer and director, elected as hereditary peer in 2011
- George Entwistle (University) – journalist, TV producer and former Director-General of the BBC
- John Exelby (University) – co-founder and editor of BBC News World Service
- Shelagh Fogarty – host of the BBC Radio 5 Live breakfast show
- Fiona Foster (Van Mildert) – television presenter of BBC Business News and ITV London Tonight
- Alastair Fothergill (St Cuthbert's) – BBC Nature producer and co-producer of The Blue Planet
- Pippa Greenwood (Trevelyan) – plant pathologist, appears on BBC Gardeners World
- Lorraine Heggessey (Collingwood) – BBC One controller (2000–2004)
- Sally El Hosaini (Collingwood) – filmmaker
- Cecil McGivern – Controller of BBC Television Service (1950–1957)
- Roger Pratt (St John's) – cinematographer and Academy Award nominee, The End of the Affair (1999)
- Ian Sharp (Hatfield) – director known for Who Dares Wins (1982) and his second-unit work on GoldenEye (1995)
- Chris Terrill (Collingwood) – documentary maker, writer and adventurer
- Dougal Wilson (University) – director; Paddington in Peru (2024)

== Military personnel ==
=== British Army ===
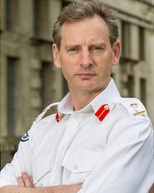
Mark Carleton-Smith

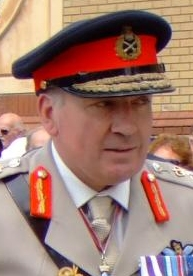
Richard Dannatt, Baron Dannatt

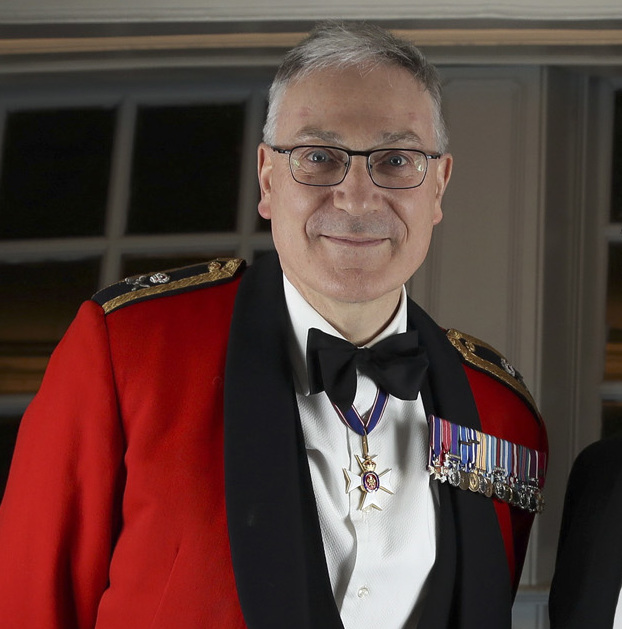
Richard Nugee

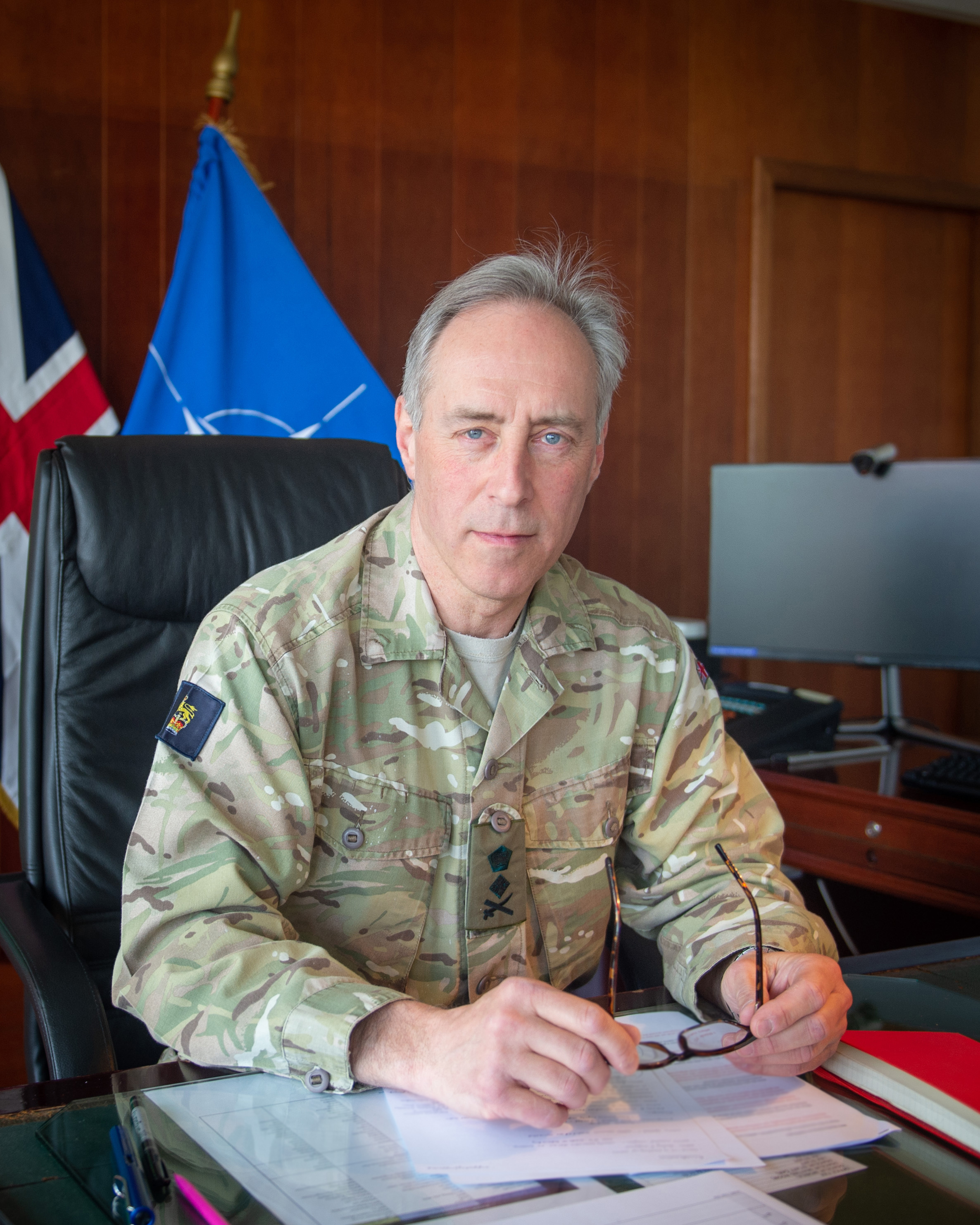
Tim Radford

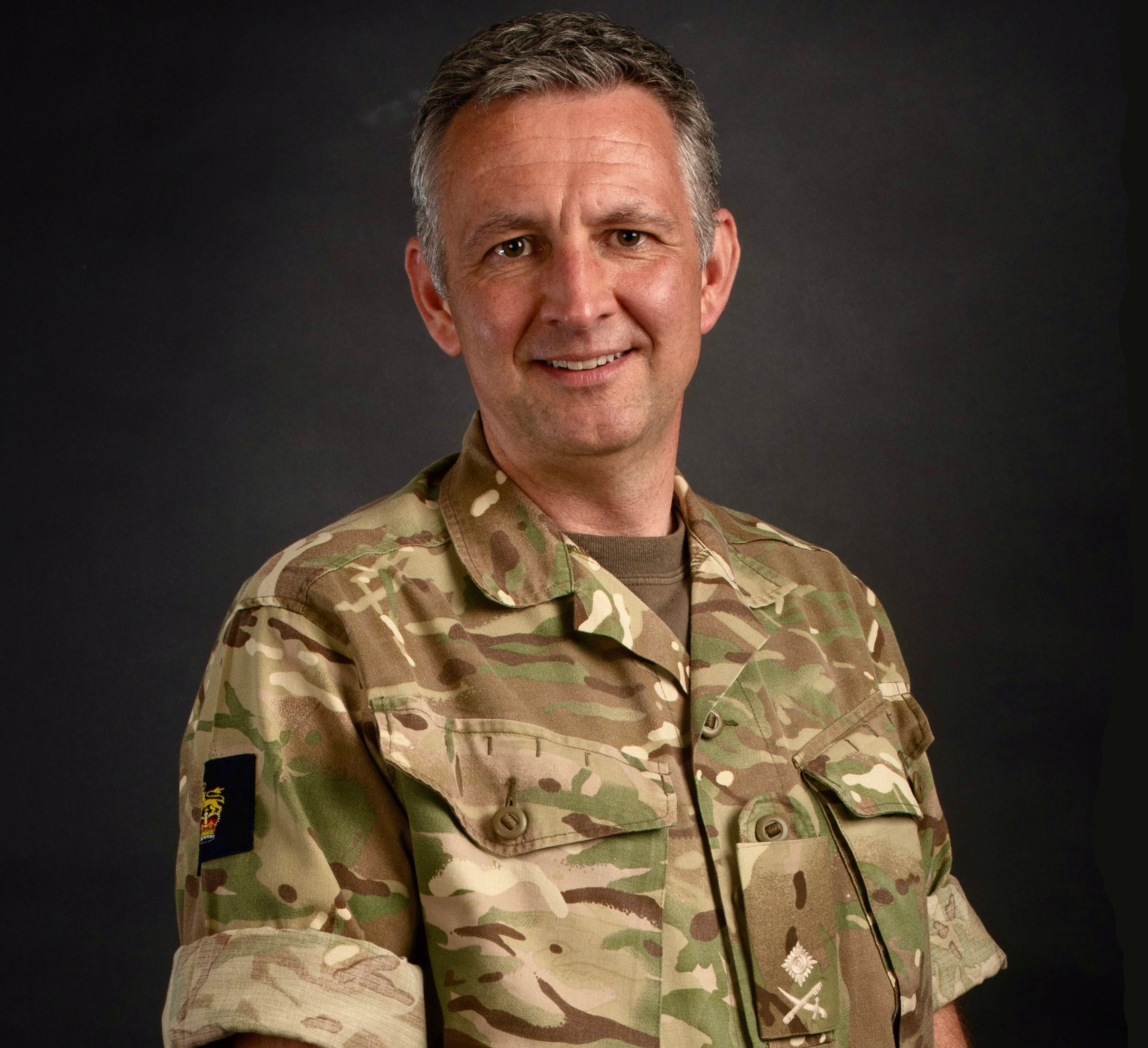
Alex Taylor

Chiefs of the General Staff
Name	College	Notes	Ref.
General Sir Mark Carleton-Smith	Hatfield	Previously Deputy Chief of the Defence Staff (Military Strategy and Operations) (2016–2018); Director Special Forces (2012–2015)	
General Sir Richard Dannatt	Hatfield	Also Constable of the Tower (2009–2016)	

Senior personnel
Name	College	Notes	Ref.
Major-General Harold Henry Blake	Armstrong	Royal Army Medical Corps	
Major-General Thomas Brodie	Bede	General Officer Commanding, 1st Division (1952–1955)	
Major-General Nicholas Cottam	Van Mildert	Military Secretary (2005–2008)	
Major-General Craig Lawrence	University	Director of Joint Warfare at the Directorate of Joint Warfare	
Lieutenant General Richard Nugee	Grey	Chief of Defence People (2016–2020); Defence Services Secretary (2015–2016)	
Major-General Peter Grant Peterkin	Hatfield	Serjeant-at-Arms of the House of Commons (2004–2007)	
Major-General Edward Phillips	College of Medicine	Director of Medical Services, British Army of the Rhine (1945–1949)	
Lieutenant-General Tim Radford	St Chad's	Deputy Supreme Allied Commander Europe (2020–)	
Major-General Andrew Ritchie	University	Commandant of the Royal Military Academy Sandhurst (2003–2006)	
Major-General John Sutherell	Grey	Director Special Forces (1996–1999)	
Major-General Alex Taylor	Hatfield	Director, Army Legal Services Branch (2019–)	

Other personnel
Name	College	Notes	Ref.
Captain Hugh Clark	King's	Won Military Cross for actions during Operation Varsity	
Captain Nigel Morgan	Hatfield	Irish Guards officer; known for helping to expose the 2004 Equatorial Guinea coup d'état attempt	
Lieutenant-Colonel John Vane, 11th Baron Barnard	?	Commanded Northumberland Hussars (1964–1966)	
Lieutenant Michael Osborne Waddell	King's	Won Military Cross for actions during Invasion of Sicily	

=== Royal Air Force ===
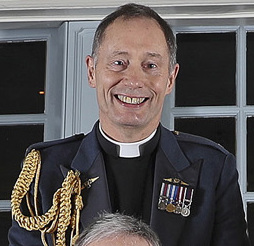
Jonathan Chaffey

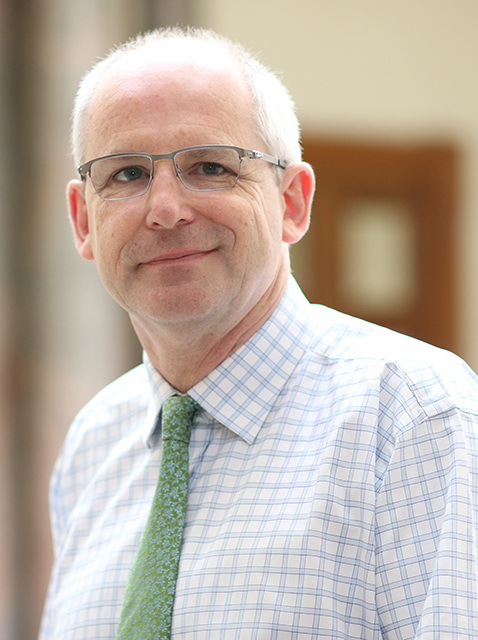
Nigel Phillips

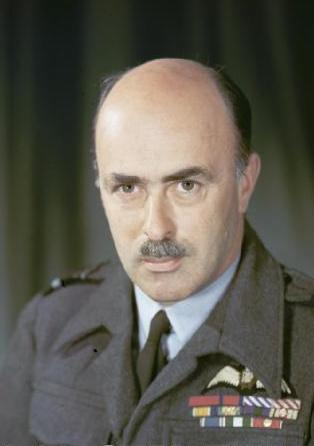
James Milne Robb

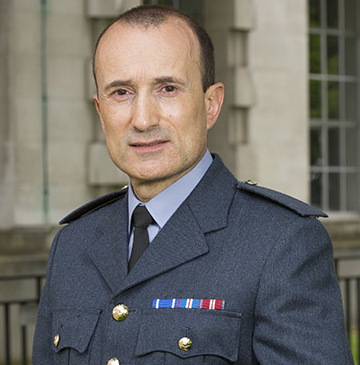
Garry Tunnicliffe

Senior personnel
Name	College	Notes	Ref.
Air Vice Marshall Jonathan Chaffey	St Chad's/St John's	Archdeacon for the Royal Air Force (2014–2018)	
Group Captain Campbell Hoy	Armstrong	Flying ace (11 victories)	
Air Commodore Nigel Phillips	?	Governor of the Falkland Islands and Commissioner for South Georgia and the South Sandwich Islands (2017–2022)	
Air Chief Marshal Sir James Robb	Armstrong	Inspector-General of the RAF (1951); Vice Chief of the Air Staff (1947–1948)	
Air Vice Marshal Adam Henry Robson	Armstrong	Director, RAF Educational Service (1944–1952)	
Air Commodore Joy Tamblin	?	Director, Women's Royal Air Force (1976–1980)	
Air Vice Marshal Garry Tunnicliffe	University	Defence Services Secretary (2016–2019)	
Air Marshal Peter Walker	Hatfield	Lieutenant Governor of Guernsey (2011–2015); Commander, Joint Warfare Centre (2005–2007)	

Other personnel
Name	College	Notes	Ref.
Flight Lieutenant Thomas Kerr	University	Pilot during Second World War; later President of the Royal Aeronautical Society (1985–1986)	

=== Royal Navy ===
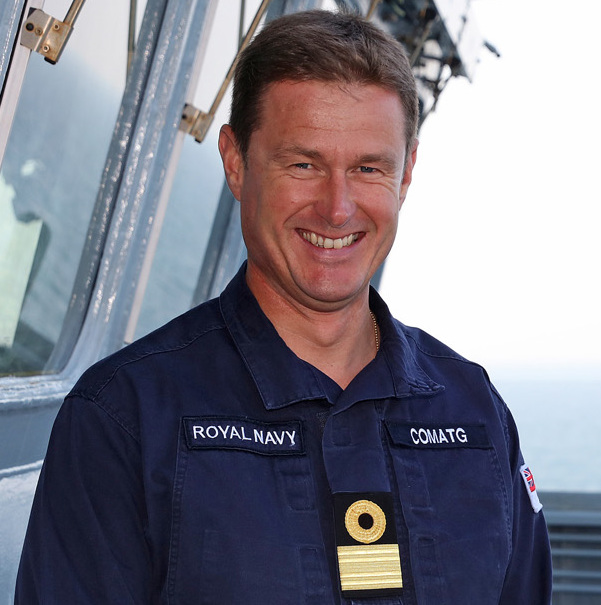
Andrew Burns

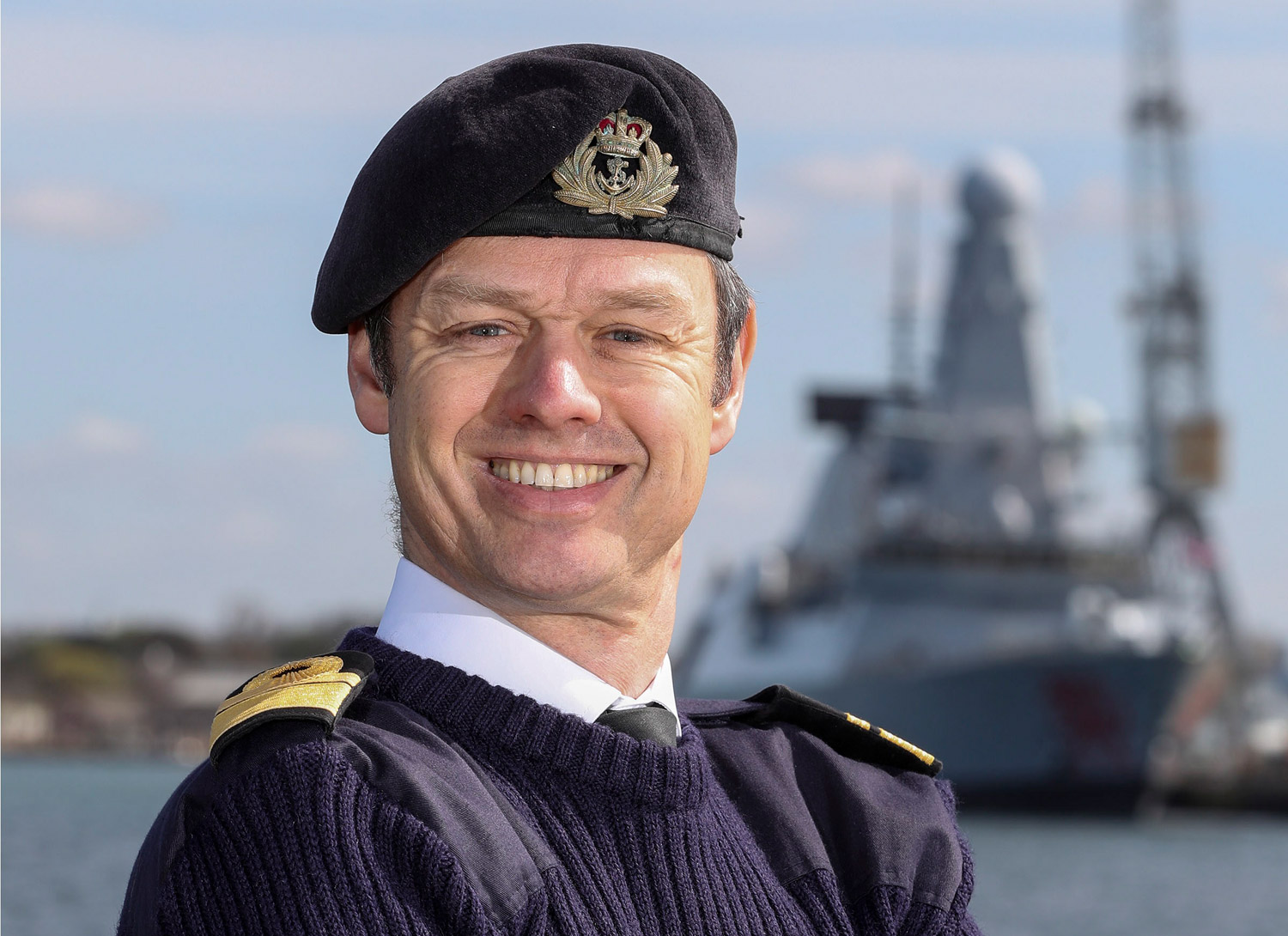
Alex Burton

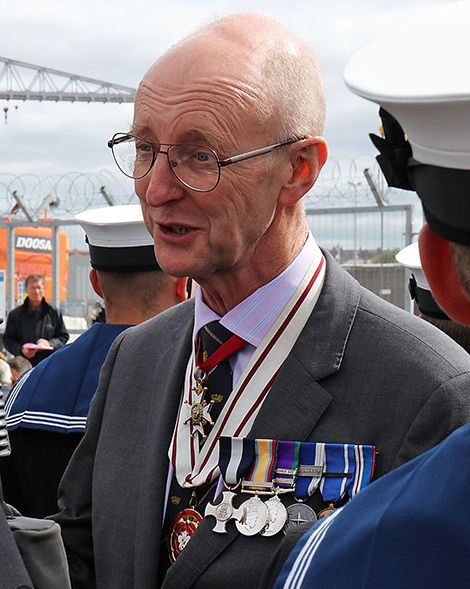
Richard Ibbotson

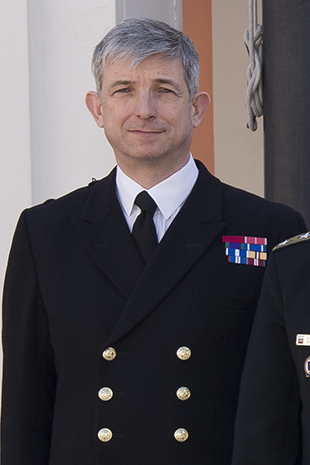
Clive Johnstone

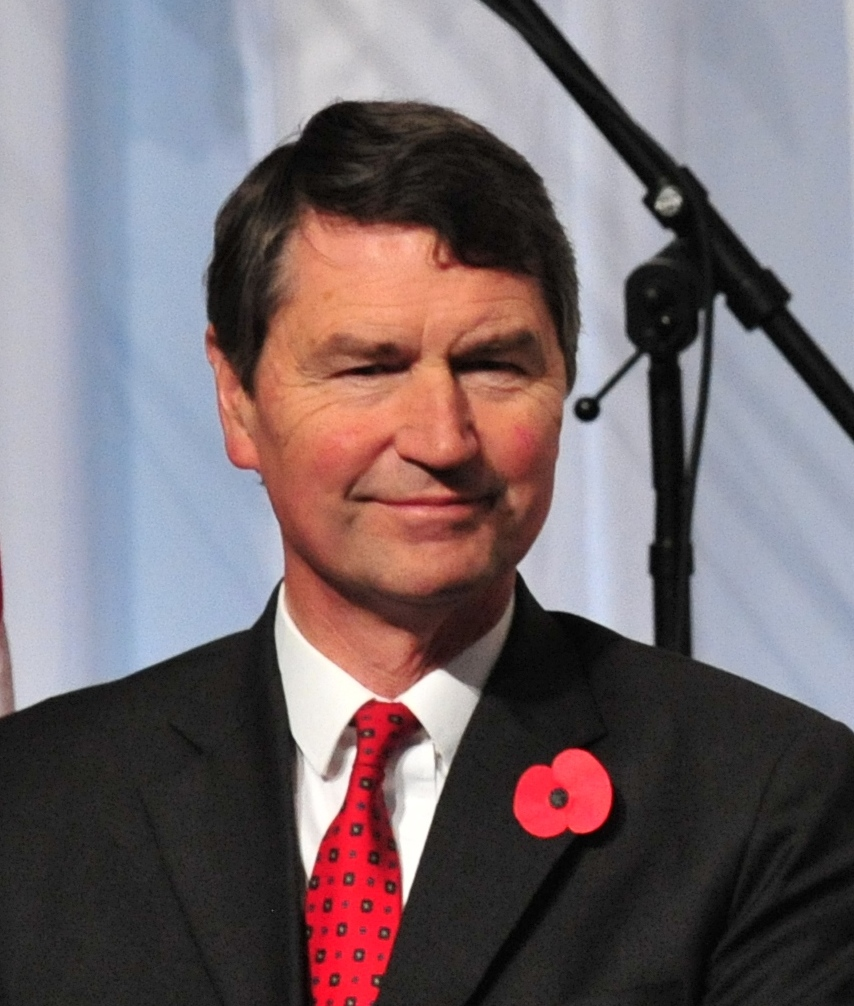
Timothy Laurence

Senior personnel
Name	College	Notes	Ref.
Vice Admiral Andrew Burns	Hatfield	Fleet Commander (2021–2025)	
Rear Admiral Alex Burton	University	Commander United Kingdom Maritime Forces (2016–2017)	
Rear Admiral Amjad Hussain	Collingwood	Controller of the Navy (2009–2012)	
Vice Admiral Sir Richard Jeffrey Ibbotson	Grey	Deputy Commander-in-Chief Fleet (2009–2011); Flag Officer Sea Training (2007–2009)	
Vice Admiral Sir Clive Johnstone	Hild Bede	Assistant Chief of the Naval Staff (Policy) (2013–2015), Commander, Allied Maritime Command (2015-2019)	
Vice Admiral Sir Tony Johnstone-Burt	Van Mildert	Commander, Joint Helicopter Command (2008–2011)	
Vice Admiral Sir Timothy Laurence	University	Chief Executive, Defence Estates (2007–2010)	
Rear Admiral Matthew Parr	Hatfield	Commander Operations (2013–2015)	
Rear Admiral Christopher Snow	St Cuthbert's	Flag Officer Sea Training (2009–2011)	
Vice Admiral Sir David Steel	Grey	Governor of Gibraltar (2020–2024); Second Sea Lord (2012–2015)	

== Musicians and artists ==
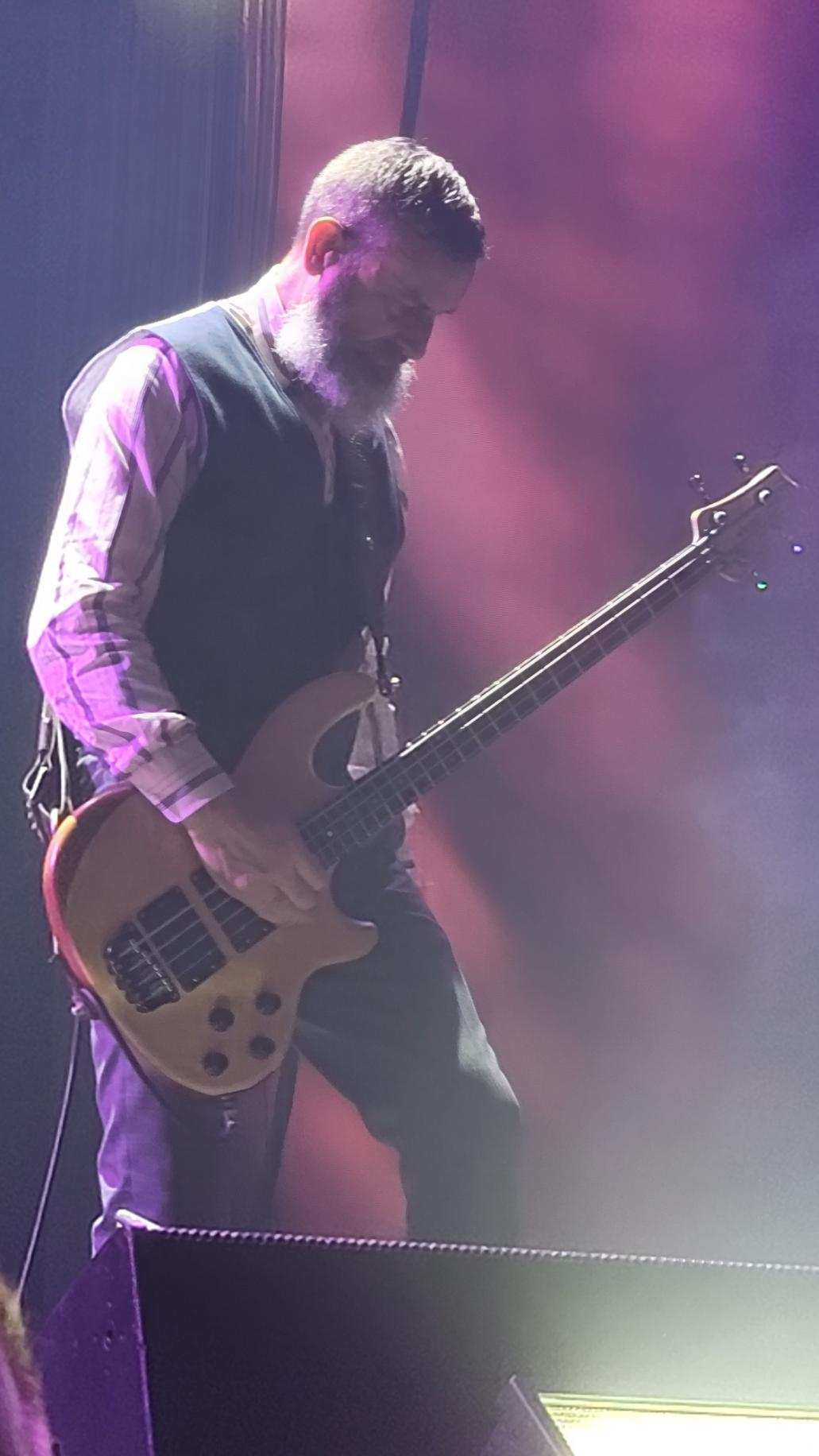
Justin Chancellor

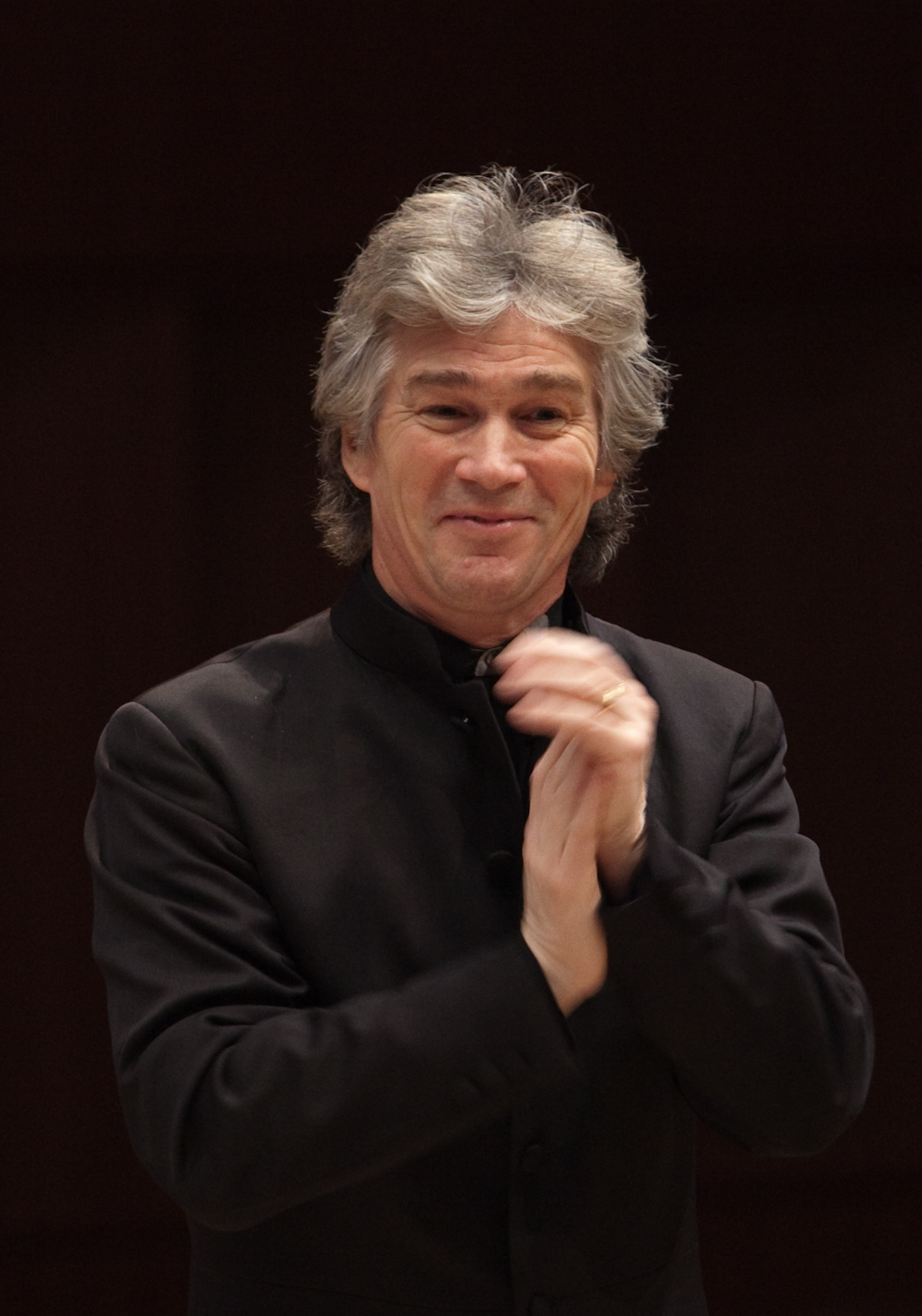
Jonathan Darlington

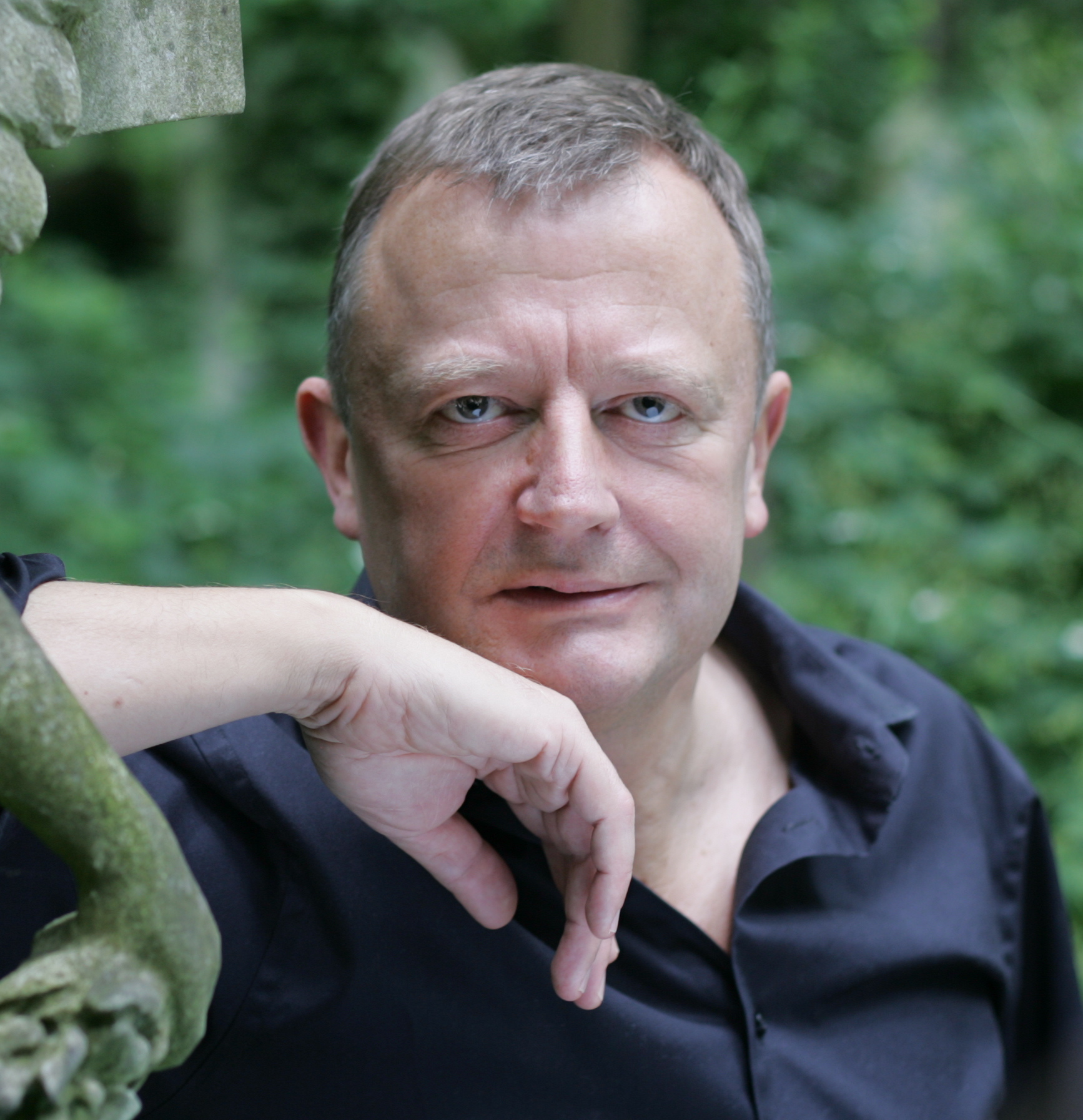
Patrick Hawes

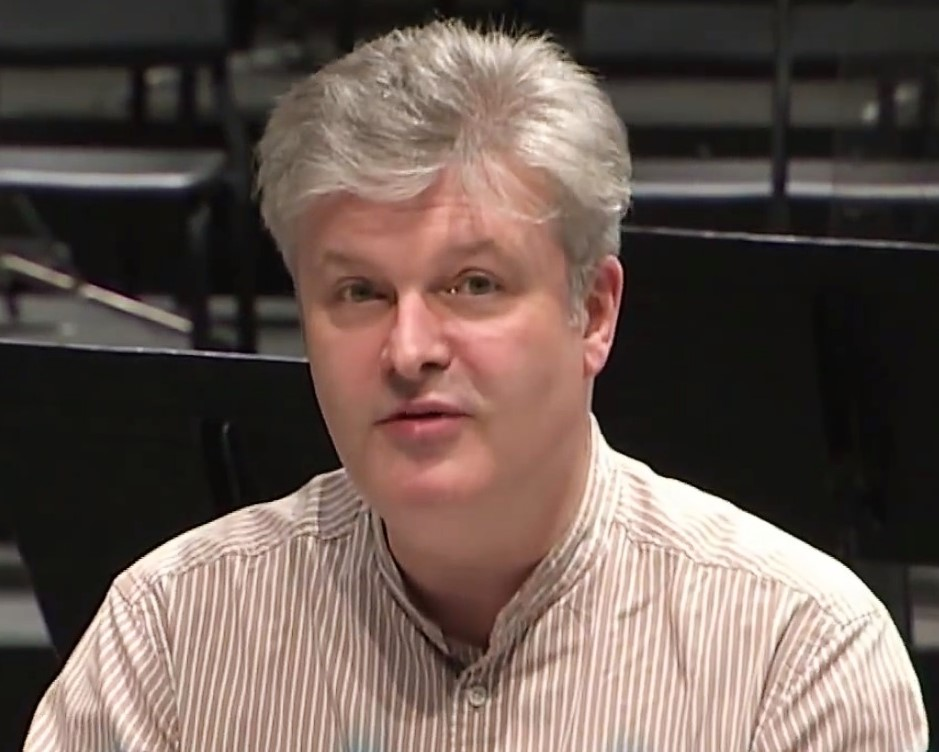
James MacMillan

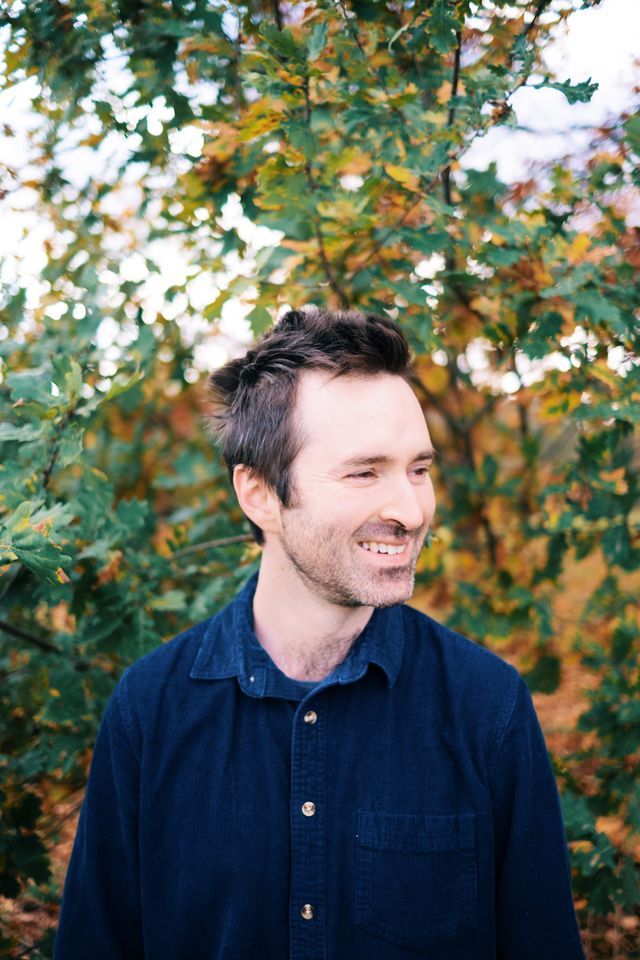
Tom Rosenthal

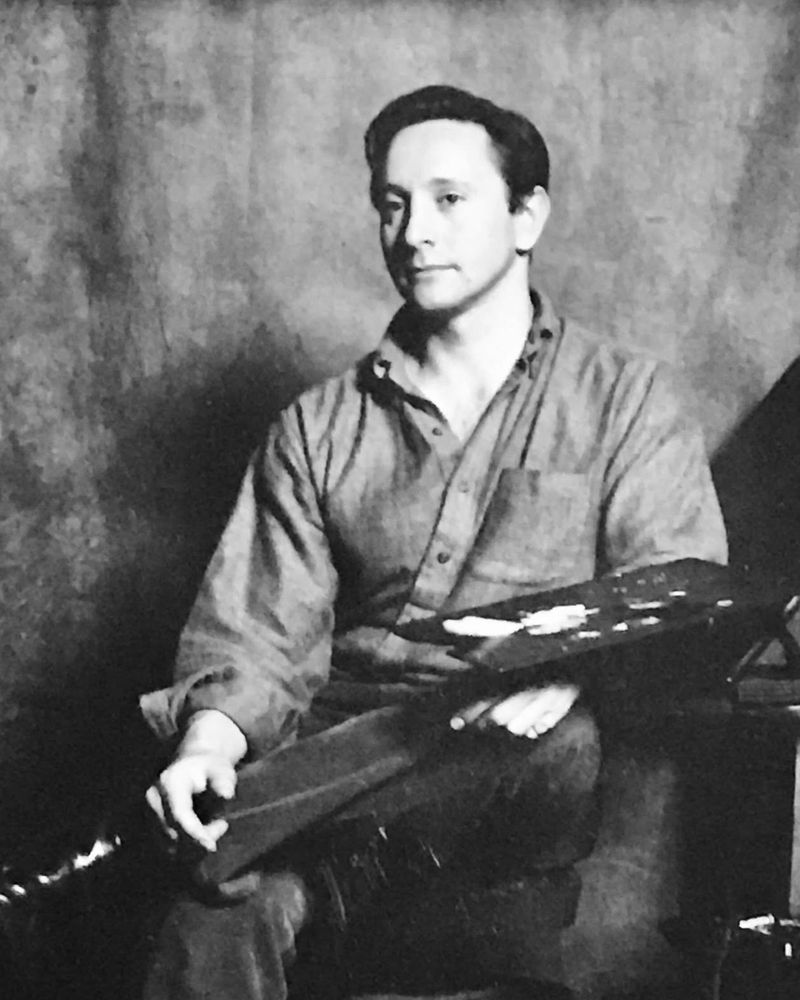
Alexander Talbot Rice

- Michael Alford (St John's) – figurative painter
- Sir Thomas Allen – operatic baritone, former Chancellor of Durham University
- Ralph Allwood (Van Mildert) – Director of Music at Eton College
- Marian Arkwright (Unattached) – composer, one of the first British women to receive a doctorate in music
- Frederic Austin – English baritone singer, musical teacher and composer from 1905 to 1930
- Edward Bairstow – organist and composer in the Anglican church music tradition
- H. Hugh Bancroft – British organist and composer who was organist of five cathedrals
- Kerry Beaumont – organist and Director of Music at Holy Trinity Church, Leamington Spa (2021–)
- Philip Best – pioneer in power electronics
- Jon Boden (Collingwood) – English fiddle player and folk singer
- Thomas Frederick Candlyn – organist and choirmaster, St. Thomas Church, New York
- Andrew Cantrill (Hild Bede) – organist and choirmaster, St. Paul's Cathedral, Buffalo, New York
- Justin Chancellor – bassist, Tool
- King Charles – indie rock artist
- J. Michael Clarke (St Chad's) – composer and musician
- Rod Clements (St Cuthbert's) – musician in folk-rock band Lindisfarne
- (Alfred) Melville Cook – British organist and conductor
- Jonathan Darlington (Hatfield) – conductor and Music Director of Vancouver Opera
- Howard Davies (St Cuthbert's) – theatre and television director
- Bryan Ferry – Roxy Music singer (only studied for one year before moving to Newcastle)
- Eveline Fischer – video game composer known for her work with Rare
- Margot Fonteyn – ballet dancer, Chancellor of Durham University
- Noel Forster (King's) – British artist
- Rumon Gamba – conductor, Chief Conductor of Oulu Symphony Orchestra
- Ruth Gipps – British composer, conductor, oboist and pianist
- Malcolm Goldring (Hatfield) – English conductor and oboist
- Dan "Nu:Tone" Gresham – drum and bass musician
- Kit Hain (St Mary's) – musician and songwriter, Marshall Hain
- J. P. E. Harper-Scott (St Chad's) – Professor of Music History and Theory at Royal Holloway, University of London
- Ted Harrison – Canadian artist
- Patrick Hawes (St Chad's) – composer and Classic FM's Composer in Residence
- Gwyneth Herbert (St Chad's) – singer-songwriter and jazz musician
- Arthur Hutchings – Professor of Music at Durham University (1947–1968)
- David Jennings (University) – composer
- John Joubert – composer of choral music
- James MacMillan (Hild Bede and Grad Soc) – Scottish composer
- Stuart MacRae (Hild Bede) – composer
- Peter Manning (Hatfield) – musicologist, Professor of Music at Durham University (1996–2015)
- Paul Miles-Kingston – director of music at St Peter's School, York
- Anthony Payne (St Cuthbert's) – composer and Elgar specialist
- Giles Ramsay (St Chad's) – theatre director, producer and playwright, Fellow of St Chad's
- Michael F. Robinson – composer and musicologist, faculty member (1961-1965)
- Tom Rosenthal (St Cuthbert's) – English singer-songwriter
- Alec Roth (Hatfield) – English composer
- Janet Mary Salsbury - English author, composer and organist
- Malcolm Sargent (Unattached) – English conductor, organist and composer
- Tim "Exile" Shaw (Hatfield) – drum and bass and IDM musician
- Robert Simpson – composer, writer, BBC producer
- Ronald Smith – English classical pianist, composer and teacher
- Alexander Talbot Rice (St Cuthbert's) – portrait artist
- Richard Terry – organist and revivalist of Tudor period music
- John Philip 'Jake' Thackray (Hatfield) - singer-songwriter, poet, humourist and journalist
- Alan Walker – musicologist and biographer of Franz Liszt
- John B. Williams (Van Mildert) – drum and bass musician and DJ

== Politicians and civil servants ==
=== Cabinet of the United Kingdom ===
Current members of the Cabinet of the United Kingdom

Name	College	Title	Ref.
Heidi Alexander	Grey	Labour MP for Lewisham East (2010–2018), Shadow Secretary of State for Health (2015–2016), Deputy Mayor of London (2018–2021), MP for Swindon South (2024–present), Minister of State at the Ministry of Justice (2024), Secretary of State for Transport (2024–present).	

=== Members of the House of Commons ===
Excluding current members of the Cabinet and Shadow Cabinet, who are listed above (if any), and former MPs who went on to be members of the House of Lords, who are listed below

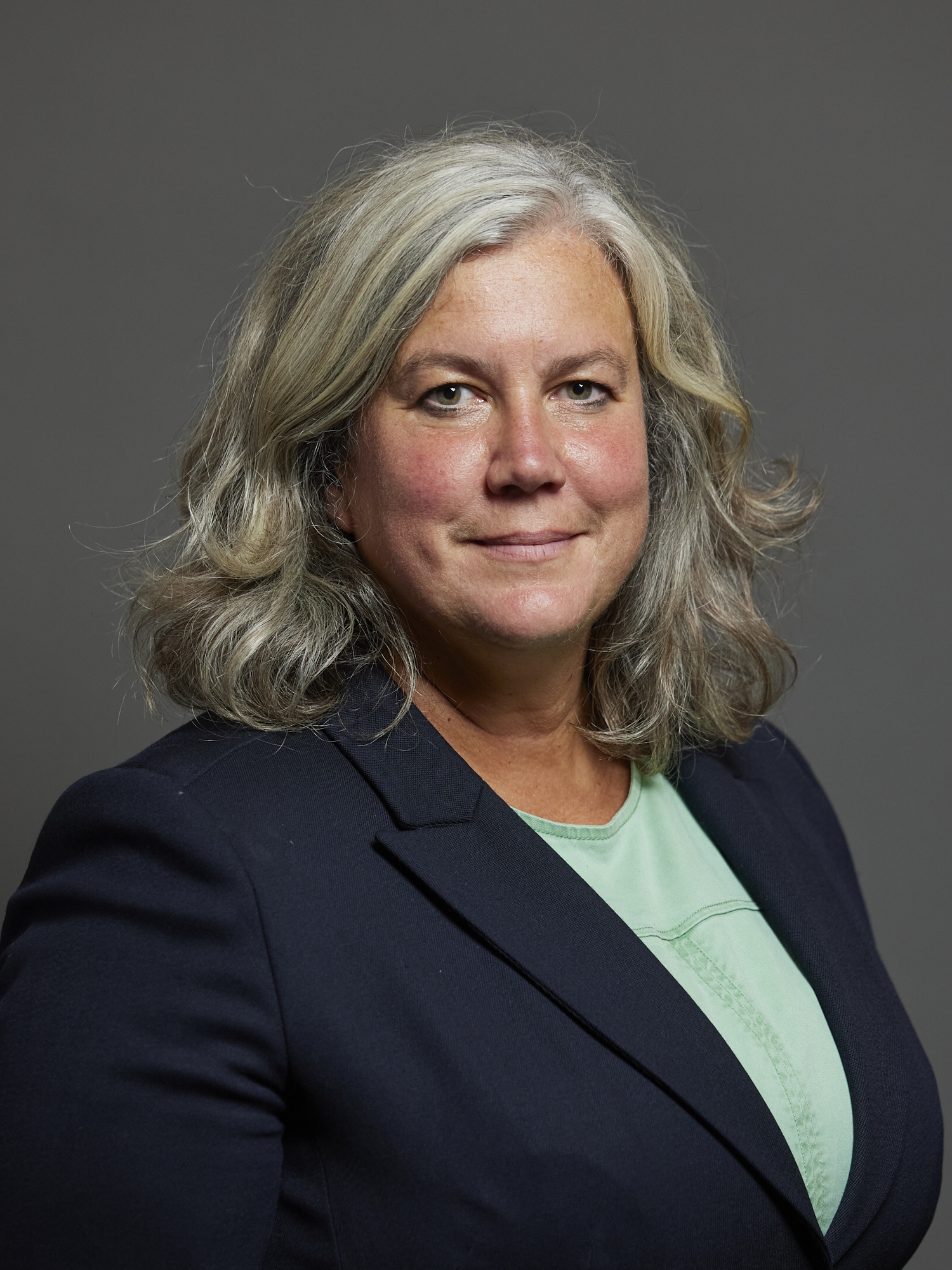
Heidi Alexander

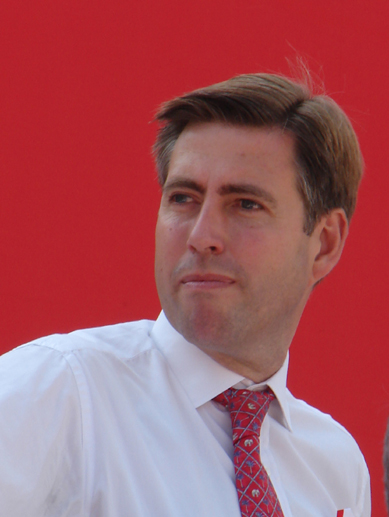
Graham Brady

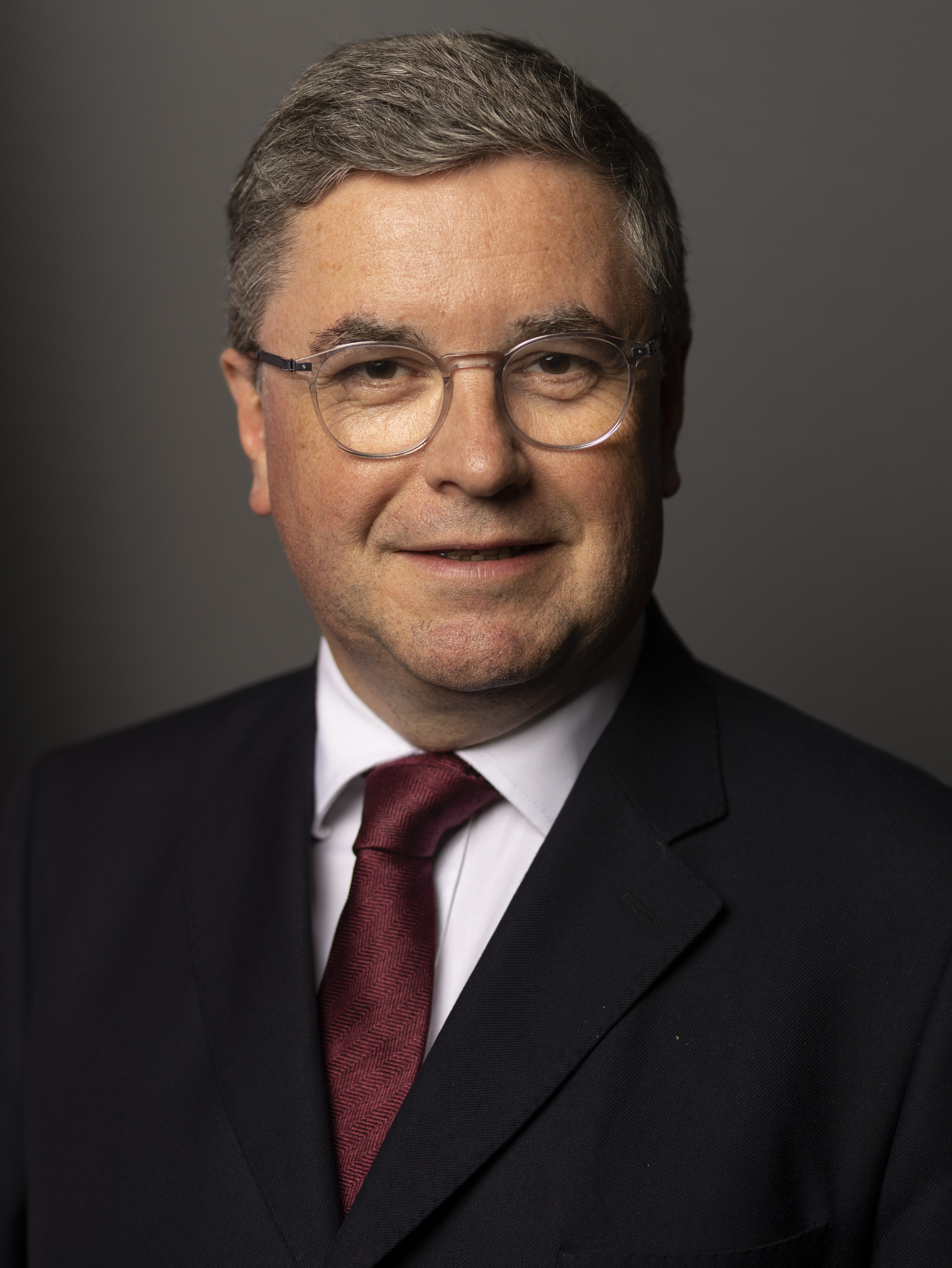
Robert Buckland

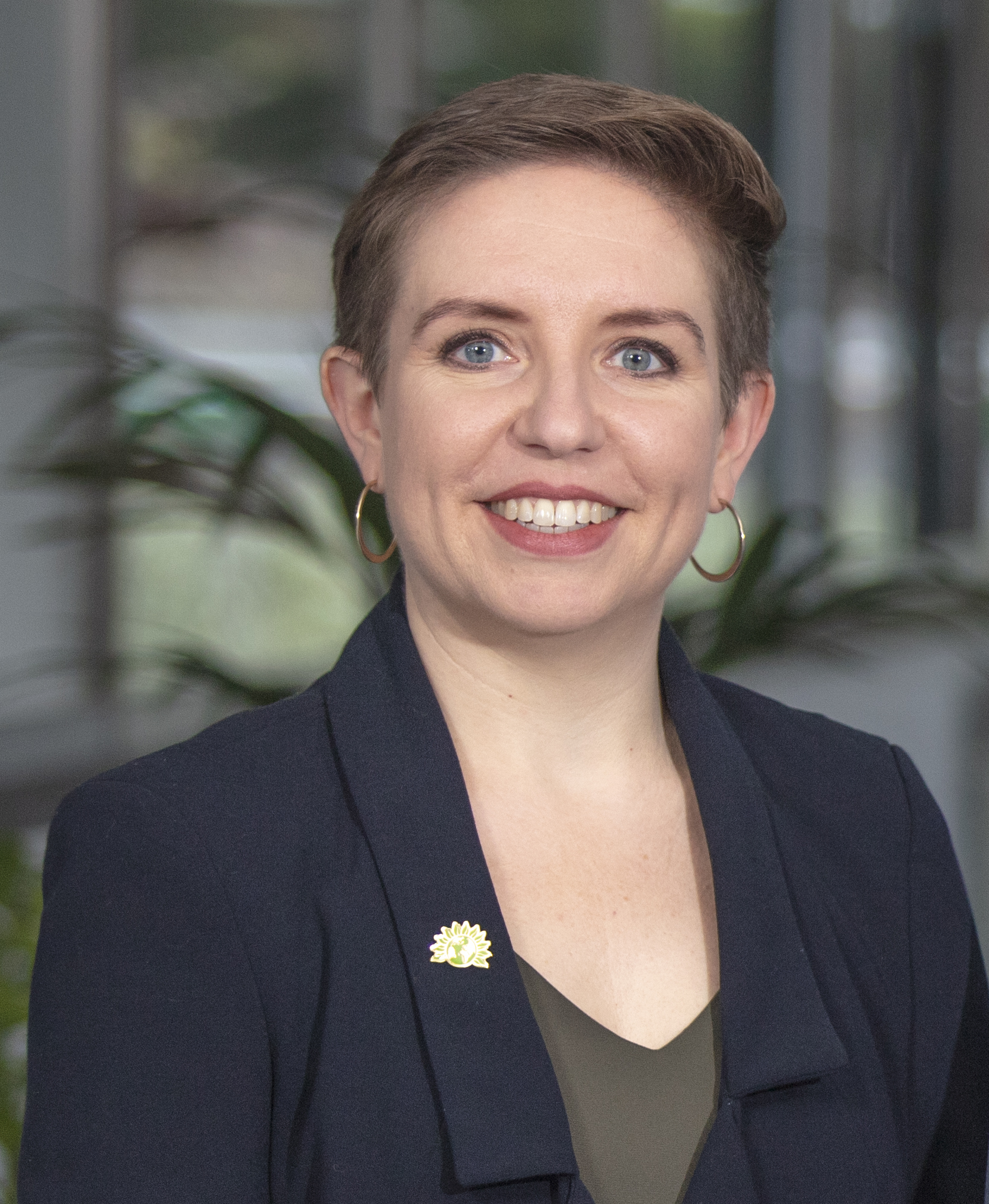
Carla Denyer

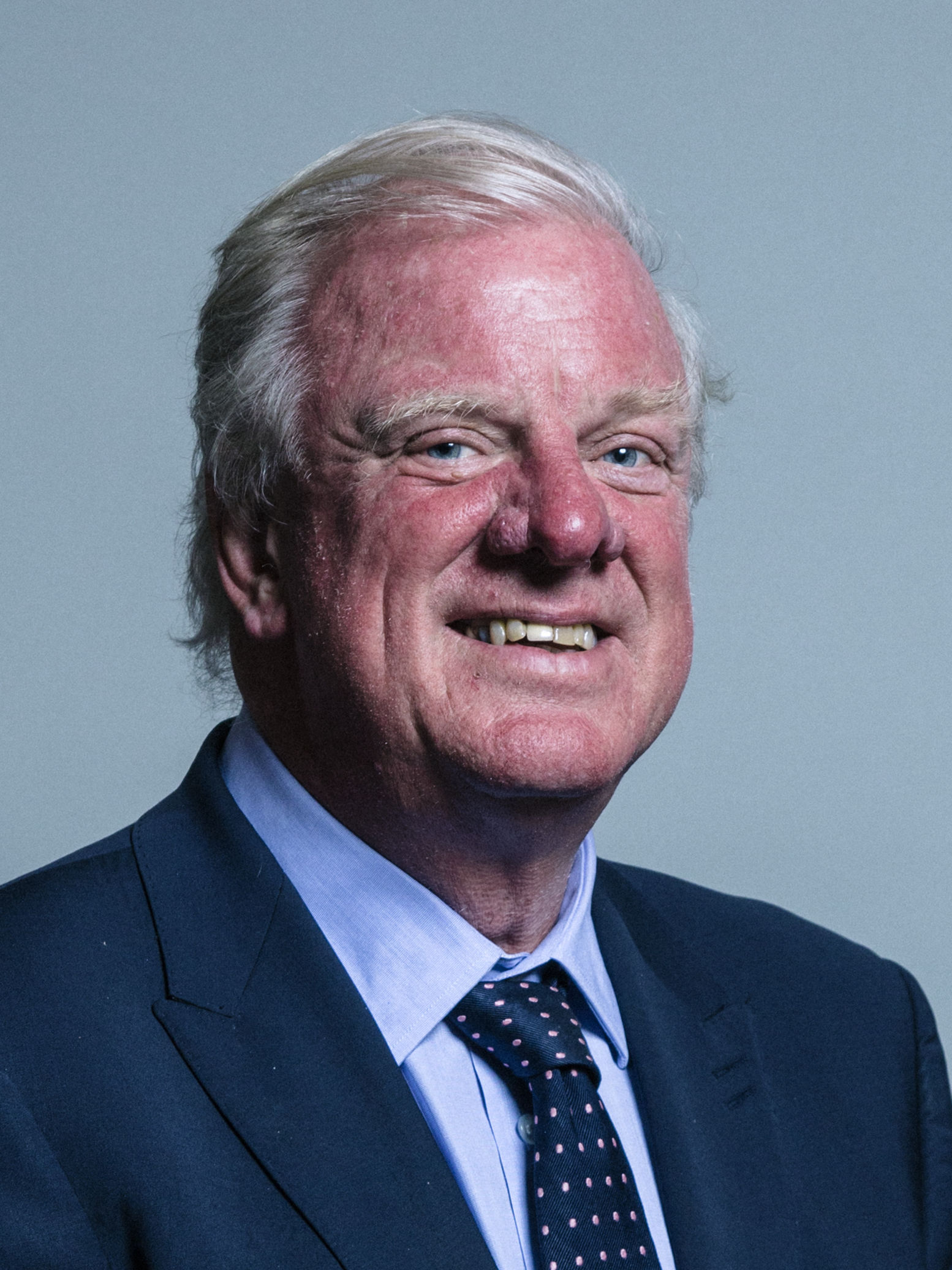
Edward Leigh

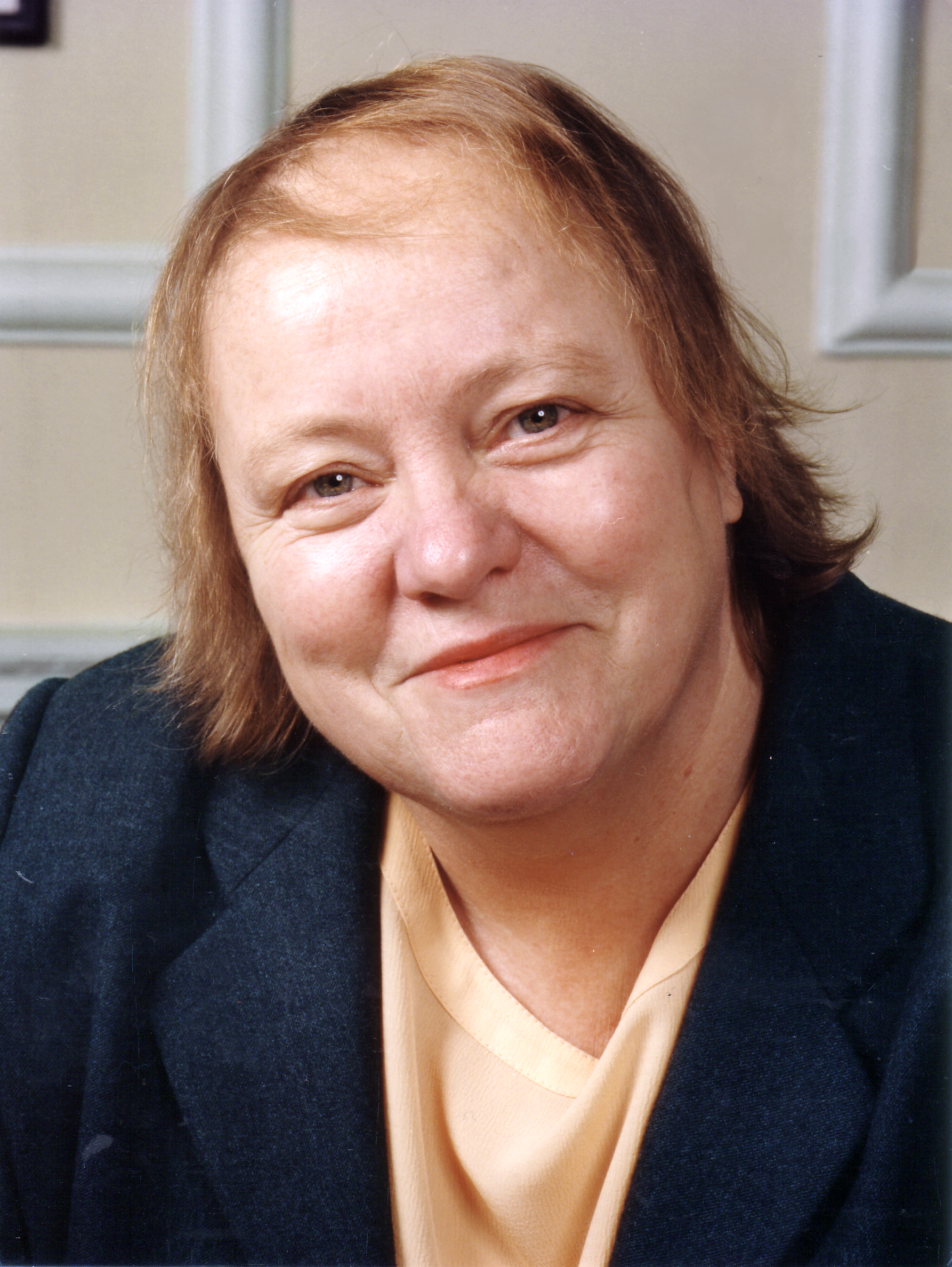
Mo Mowlam

Name	College	Notes	Ref.
Lucy Allan	Trevelyan	Conservative MP for Telford (2015–2024)	
David Anderson	?	Labour MP for Blaydon (2005–2017); Shadow Secretary of State for Northern Ireland and Shadow Secretary of State for Scotland (2016–2017)	
Jonathan Ashworth	St Aidan's	Labour MP for Leicester South (2011–2024), Shadow Secretary of State for Health and Social Care (2023–2024)	
Emerson Muschamp Bainbridge	?	Liberal MP for Gainsborough (1895–1900)	
Crispin Blunt	University	Conservative MP for Reigate (1997–2024)	
James Boyden	King's	Labour MP for Bishop Auckland (1959–1979)	
Graham Brady	St Aidan's	Conservative MP for Altrincham and Sale West (1997–2024); Chairman of 1922 Committee (2010–2019, 2020–2024)	
Phil Brickell	?	Labour MP for Bolton West (2024–present)	
Sir Robert Buckland	Hatfield	Conservative MP for Swindon South (2010–2024), Lord Chancellor and Secretary of State for Justice (2019–2021)	
Jenny Chapman	?	Labour MP for Darlington (2010–2019)	
Victoria Collins	Van Mildert	Liberal Democrat MP for Harpenden and Berkhamsted (2024–)	
John Robert Davison	University	Liberal MP for the City of Durham (1868–1871)	
Carla Denyer	St Chad's	Co-leader of the Green Party of England and Wales (2021–2025), Green MP for Bristol Central (2024–present)	
Jackie Doyle-Price	University	Conservative MP for Thurrock (2010–2024)	
Bill Etherington	?	Labour MP for Sunderland North (1992–2010)	
Ben Everitt	?	Conservative MP for Milton Keynes North (2019–2024)	
Nick Gibb	Hild Bede	Conservative MP for Bognor Regis and Littlehampton (1997–2024)	
Paul Goggins	Ushaw	Labour MP for Wythenshawe and Sale East (1997–2014)	
Thomas George Greenwell	College of Medicine	Conservative MP for The Hartlepools (1943–1945)	
Jane Griffiths	St Mary's	Labour MP for Reading East (1997–2005)	
Ben Howlett	St John's	Conservative MP for Bath (2015–2017)	
Mark Hughes	King's	Labour MP for Durham (1970–1983); City of Durham (1983–1987)	
Andrew Hunter	St John's	Conservative (1983–2002); Independent Conservative (2002–2005); and Democratic Unionist Party (2005) MP for Basingstoke	
Sarah Jones	Trevelyan	Labour MP for Croydon Central (2017–2024) and for Croydon West (2024–present), Minister of State for Industry and Decarbonisation (2024–present)	
Peter Kilfoyle	?	Labour MP for Liverpool Walton (1991–2010)	
Joseph Leech	College of Medicine	Unionist Party MP for Newcastle upon Tyne West (1931–1940)	
Edward Leigh	University	Conservative MP for Gainsborough and Horncastle (1983–1997); Gainsborough (1997–present); Father of the House (2024–present)	
Malcolm MacDonald	―	Labour MP for Bassetlaw (1929–1931); National Labour MP for Bassetlaw (1931–1935); Ross and Cromarty (1936–1945); Chancellor of the University of Durham (1971–1980)	
David Mackintosh	?	Conservative MP for Northampton South (2015–2017)	
Shona McIsaac	St Aidan's	Labour MP for Cleethorpes (1997–2010)	
Alan Meale	?	Labour MP for Mansfield (1987–2017)	
Piers Merchant	University	Conservative MP for Newcastle upon Tyne Central (1983–1987); Beckenham (1992–1997)	
Huw Merriman	University	Conservative MP for Bexhill and Battle (2015–2024),	
Fergus Montgomery	Bede	Conservative MP Newcastle upon Tyne East (1959–1964); Brierley Hill (1967–1974); Altrincham and Sale (1974–1997)	
Iqbal Mohamed	?	Independent MP for Dewsbury and Batley (2024—present)	
Mo Mowlam	Trevelyan	Labour MP for Redcar (1987–2001); Secretary of State for Northern Ireland (1997–1999)	
Oswald O'Brien	St Cuthbert's	Labour MP for Darlington (1983)	
Tris Osborne	Hild Bede	Labour MP for Chatham and Aylesford (2024–present)	
John Pugh	St Cuthbert's	Liberal Democrat MP for Southport (2001–2017)	
Nathan Raw	College of Medicine	Conservative MP for Liverpool Wavertree (1918–1922)	
Lucy Rigby	?	Labour MP for Northampton North (2024–)	
Sam Rushworth	Staff	Labour MP for Bishop Auckland (2024–present)	
Thomas Sexton	Bede	Labour MP for Barnard Castle (1935–1945)	
Edward Shortt	University	Liberal MP for Newcastle upon Tyne (1910–1918); Newcastle upon Tyne West (1918–1922); Home Secretary (1919–1922); Chief Secretary for Ireland (1918–1919)	
David Simmonds	Grey	Conservative MP for Ruislip, Northwood and Pinner (2019–)	
Sir John Sinclair, 3rd Baronet	University	Liberal MP for Caithness (1869–1885)	
John Slinger	University	Labour MP for Rugby (2024–)	
Lisa Smart	?	Liberal Democrat MP for Hazel Grove (2024–)	
Rachel Squire	Trevelyan	Labour MP for Dunfermline West (1992–2005)	
Robert Strother Stewart	Hatfield/Armstrong	Liberal MP for Stockton-on-Tees (1923–1924)	
Peter Swallow	Staff	Labour MP for the Bracknell (2024–present)	
Thomas Charles Thompson	University	Liberal MP for the City of Durham (1874 & 1880–1885)	
Edward Timpson	Hatfield	Conservative MP for Crewe and Nantwich (2008–2017) and for Eddisbury (2019–2024)	
Henry Villiers-Stuart	University	Liberal MP for County Waterford (1873–1874 & 1880–1885)	
Matt Warman	St Cuthbert's	Conservative MP for Boston and Skegness (2015–2024)	
Thomas Watts	College of Medicine	Conservative MP for Manchester Withington (1922–1923 & 1924–1929)	
Jenny Willott	St Mary's	Liberal Democrat MP for Cardiff Central (2005–2015)	
Esmond Wright	Armstrong	Conservative MP for Glasgow Pollok (1967–1970)	

=== Members of the House of Lords ===
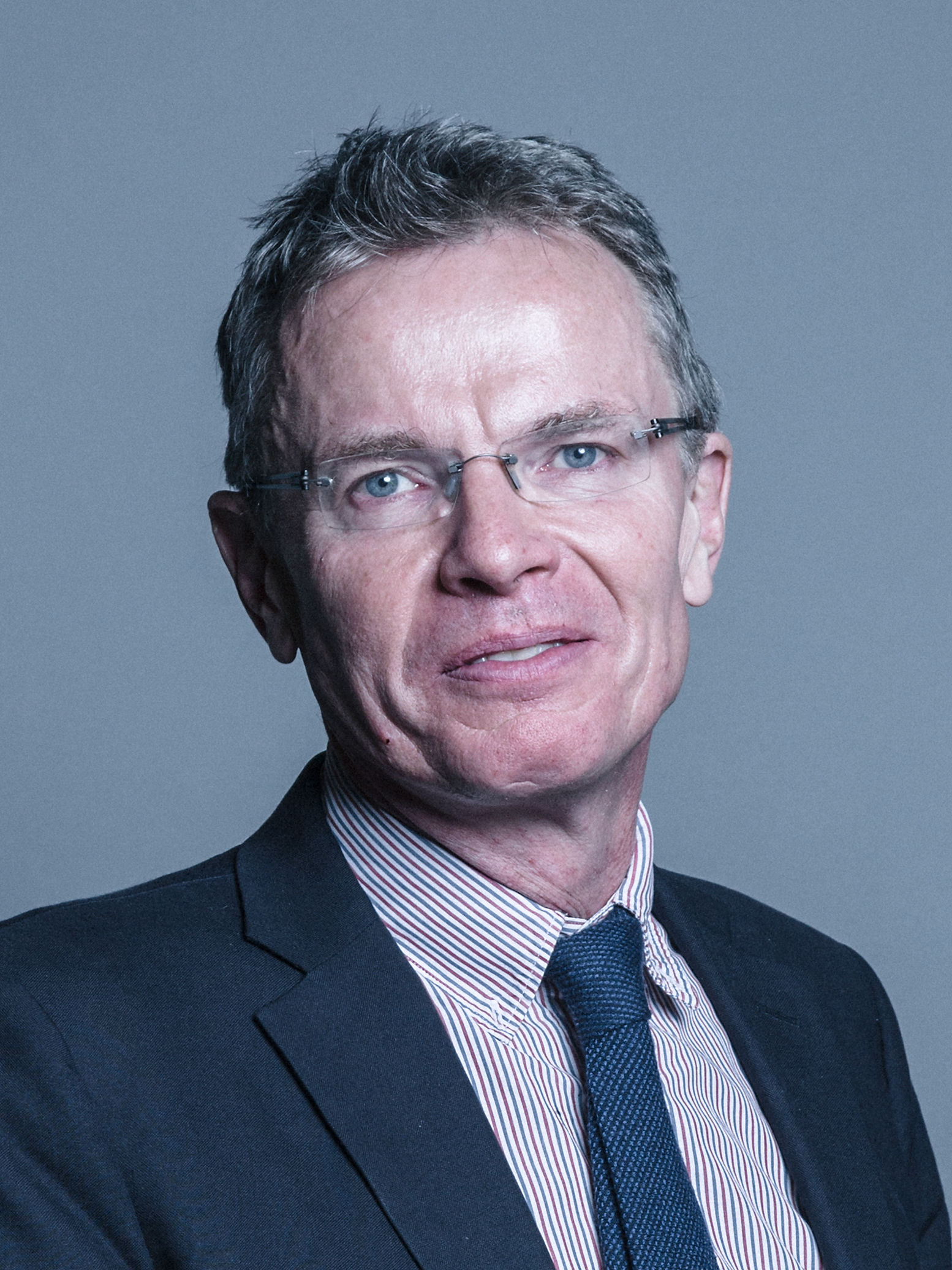
Charles Colville, 5th Viscount Colville of Culross

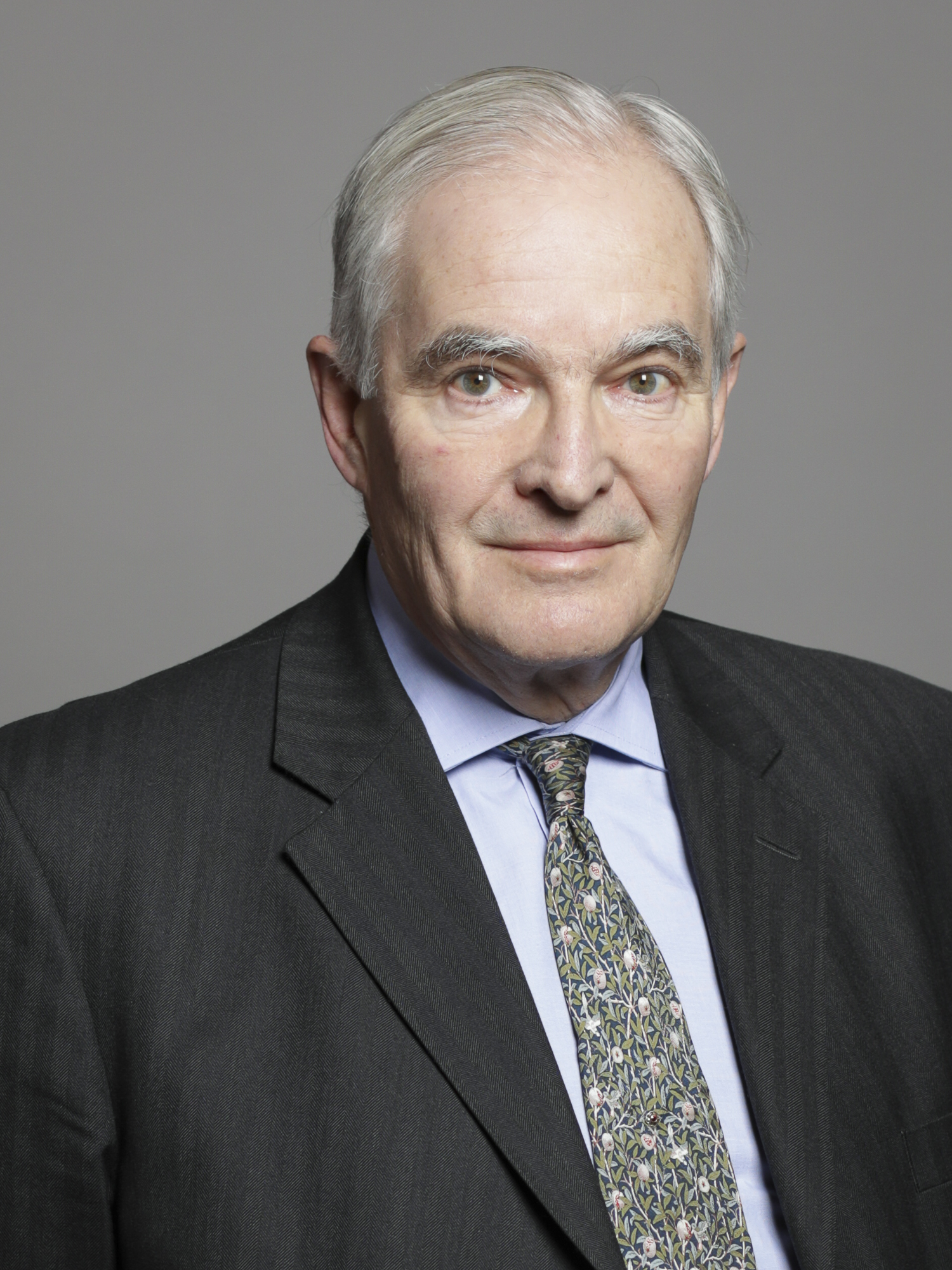
Oliver Eden, 8th Baron Henley

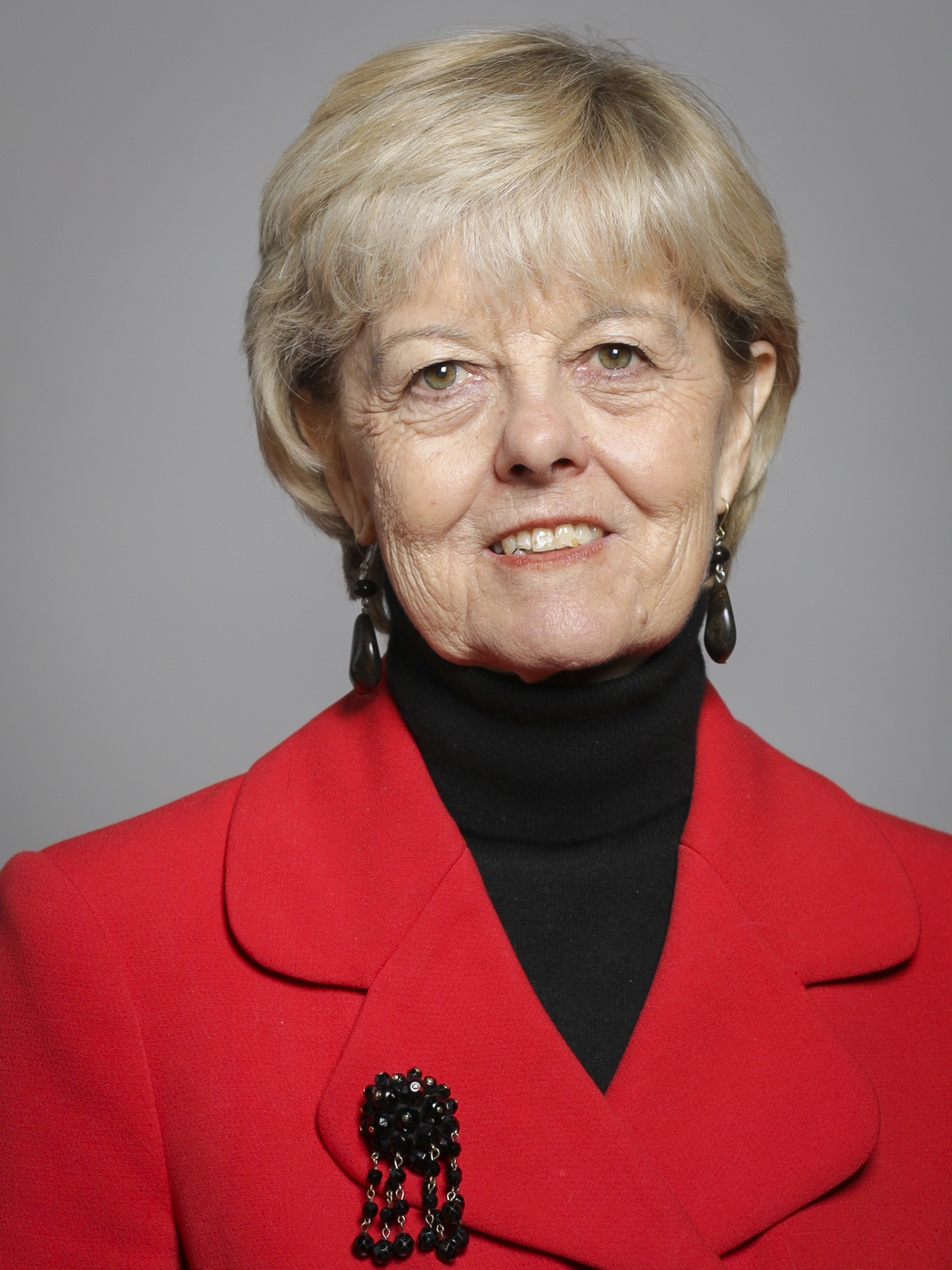
Dianne Hayter, Baroness Hayter of Kentish Town

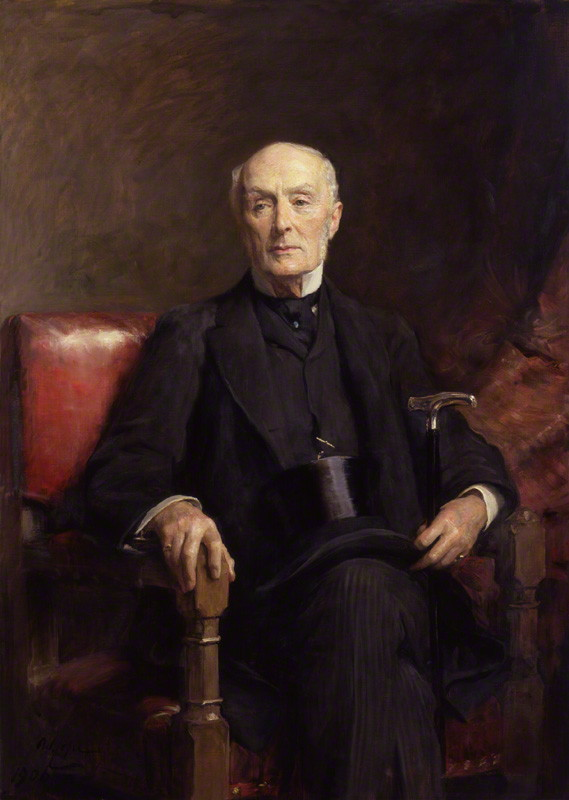
Viscount Knutsford

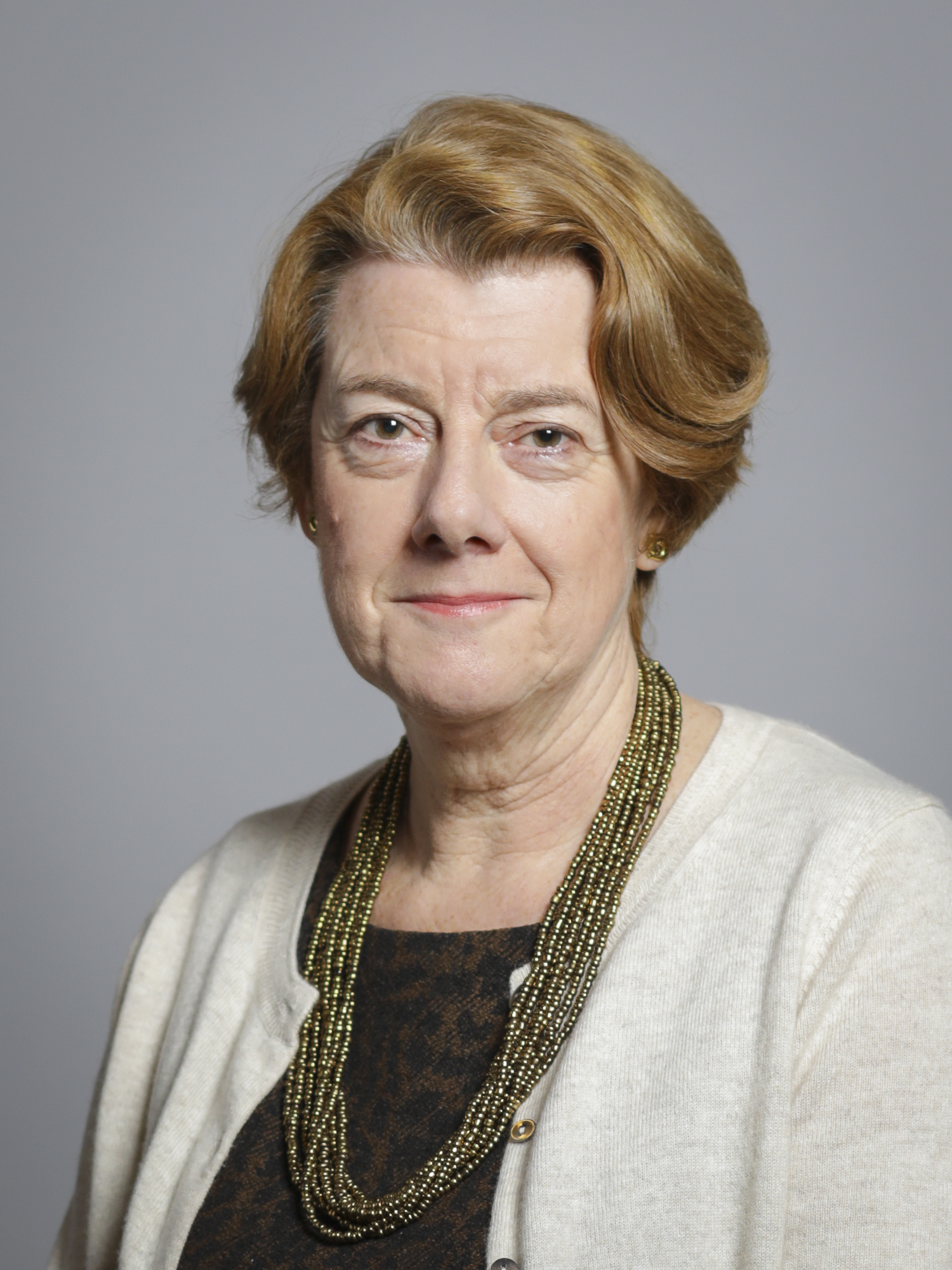
Sally Morgan, Baroness Morgan of Huyton

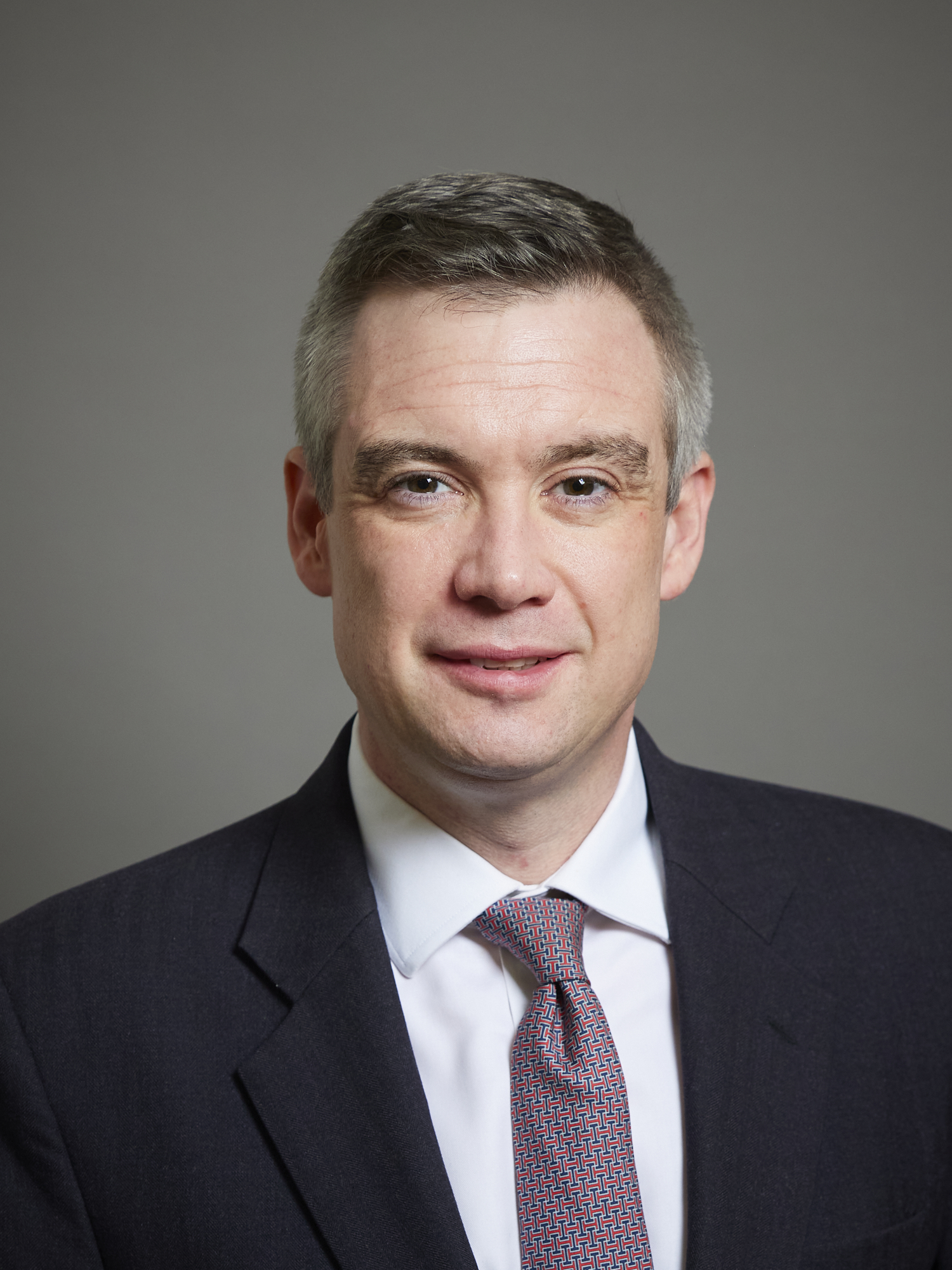
James Wharton, Baron Wharton of Yarm

Name	College	Notes	Ref.
Jonathan Berry, 5th Viscount Camrose	St Cuthbert's	Parliamentary Under-Secretary of State at Department for Science, Innovation and Technology	
Jenny Chapman, Baroness Chapman of Darlington	?	Shadow Minister for the Cabinet Office	
Charles Colville, 5th Viscount Colville of Culross	St Chad's	Member of the House of Lords (2011–)	
Jack Cunningham, Baron Cunningham of Felling	Bede	Chancellor of the Duchy of Lancaster (1998–1999)	
Joe Docherty, Baron Docherty of Milngavie	N/A	Chair of Durham University council 2018–2025	
Jack Dormand, Baron Dormand of Easington	Bede	Chair of the Parliamentary Labour Party (1981–1987); Labour MP for Easington (1970–1987)	
Oliver Eden, 8th Baron Henley	Collingwood	Lord-in-waiting (1989, 2016–2017)	
Dianne Hayter, Baroness Hayter of Kentish Town	Trevelyan	Shadow Deputy Leader of the House of Lords (2017–)	
Henry Holland, 1st Viscount Knutsford	University	Secretary of State for the Colonies (1887–1892)	
Michael Jopling, Baron Jopling	King's	Minister of Agriculture, Fisheries and Food (1983–1987); Conservative MP for Westmorland (1964–1983); Westmorland and Lonsdale (1983–1997)	
Herbert Laming, Baron Laming	King's	Chairman of Committees (2015–2016); Convenor of the Crossbench Peers (2011–2015)	
Massey Lopes, 4th Baron Roborough	St Cuthbert's		
Roger Lumley, 11th Earl of Scarbrough	―	Chancellor of the University of Durham (1958–1969)	
Sally Morgan, Baroness Morgan of Huyton	Van Mildert	Member of the House of Lords (2001–)	
Fred Peart, Baron Peart	Bede	Leader of the House of Lords (1976–1979); Labour MP for Workington (1945–1976)	
Henry Percy, 7th Duke of Northumberland	―	Chancellor of the University of Durham (1913–1918)	
Randolph Quirk, Baron Quirk	―	Professor of English Language at University of Durham (1958–1960); Member of the House of Lords (1994–2017)	
John Sewel, Baron Sewel	University	Chairman of Committees (2012–2015); Member of the House of Lords (1996–2015)	
Maeve Sherlock, Baroness Sherlock	St Chad's	Honorary Fellow and Tutor at St Chad's College; Member of the House of Lords (2010–)	
Dominic Johnson, Baron Johnson of Lainston	Collingwood	Member of the House of Lords (2022–); Minister of State for Investment (2022); Deputy Chairman of the Conservative Party (2016–2019)	
Edward Short, Baron Glenmara	Bede	Deputy Leader of the Labour Party (1972–1976); Labour MP for Newcastle upon Tyne Central (1951–1976)	
Charles Vane-Tempest-Stewart, 7th Marquess of Londonderry	―	Chancellor of the University of Durham (1931–1949)	
Richard Walker, Baron Walker of Broxton	St Aidan's	Executive chairman of Iceland Foods	
James Wharton, Baron Wharton of Yarm	University	Conservative MP for Stockton South (2010–2017), entered House of Lords 2020, Chair of the Office for Students (2021–2024)	

=== Members of devolved assemblies and parliaments ===
Name	College	Notes	Ref.
Nick Ramsay	St John's	Conservative Member of the Welsh Assembly for Monmouth (2007–2021)	
Patrick Roche	Graduate Society	Northern Ireland Unionist Party Member of the Northern Ireland Assembly for Lagan Valley (1998–2003)	
Mike Tuffrey	University	Liberal Democrat Member of the London Assembly as an additional member (2002–2012)	

=== Members of the European Parliament ===
Name	College	Notes	Ref.
Paul Brannen	?	Labour Party MEP for North East England (2014–2019)	
Alexandra Phillips	St Mary's	Brexit Party MEP for South East England (2019–2020)	
Jake Pugh	Hatfield	Brexit Party MEP for Yorkshire and the Humber (2019–2020)	

=== Ambassadors and High Commissioners ===
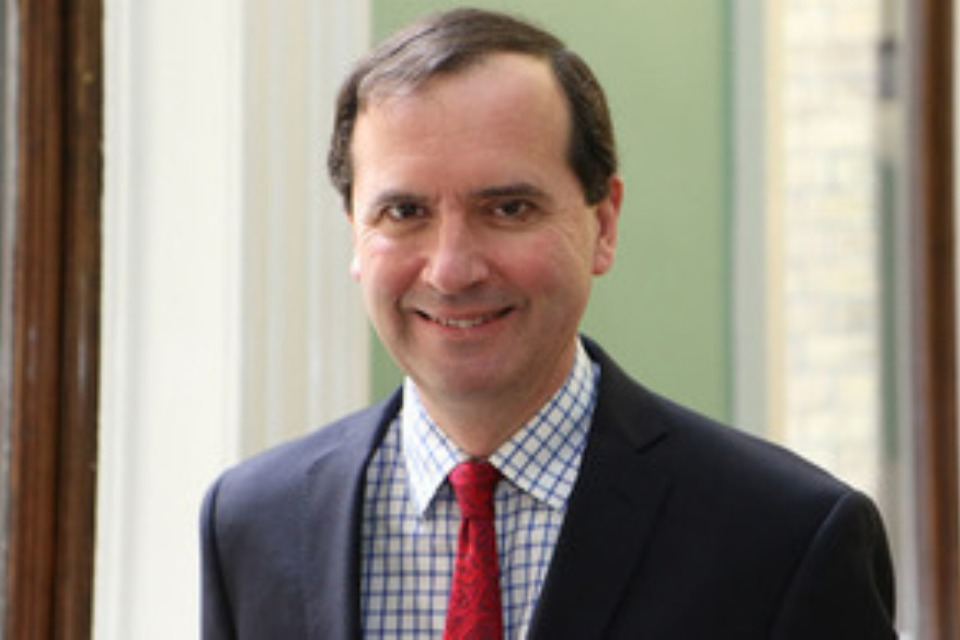
Fergus Cochrane-Dyet

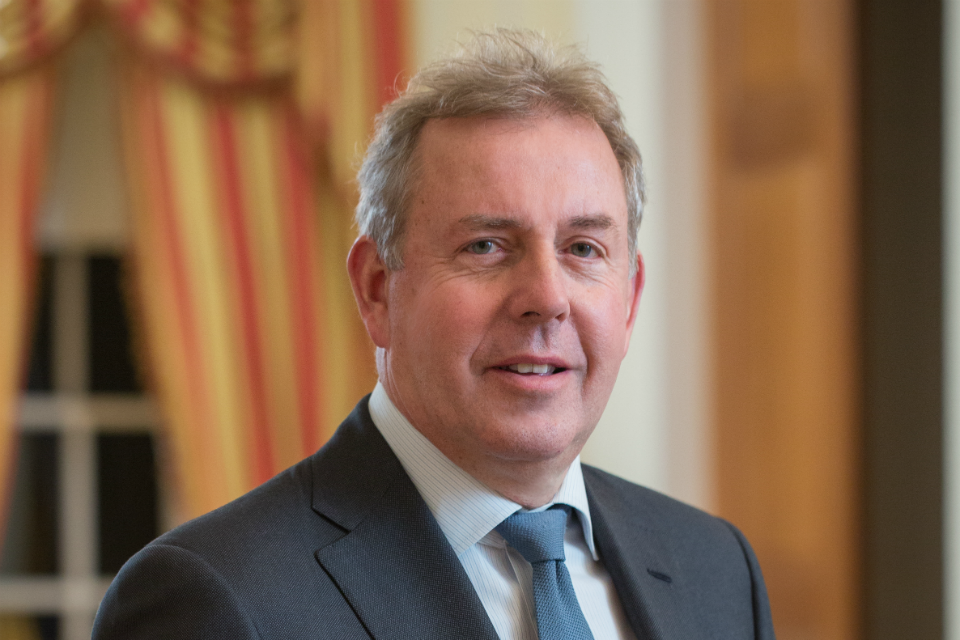
Kim Darroch

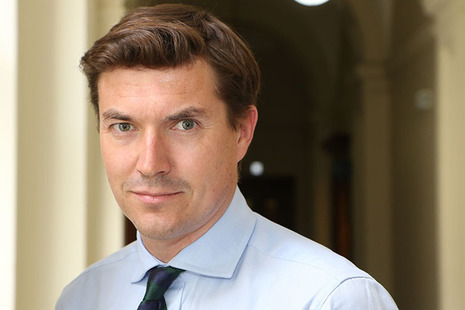
James Roscoe

United Kingdom
Name	College	Notes	Ref.
Asif Ahmad	St Cuthbert's	British High Commissioner to Jamaica and the Bahamas (2017–); British Ambassador to the Republic of the Philippines and Palau (2013–2017); British Ambassador to the Kingdom of Laos (2010–2012); British Ambassador to Thailand (2010–2012)	
Norman Aspin	St John's	British High Commissioner to Malta (1976–1979)	
David Carter	Hatfield	British High Commissioner to Bangladesh (2000–2004)	
Anwar Choudhury	?	Governor of the Cayman Islands (2018–); British Ambassador to Peru (2014–2018); British High Commissioner to Bangladesh (2004–2008)	
Fergus Cochrane-Dyet	Grey	British High Commissioner to Zambia (2016–); British Ambassador to Liberia (2013–2015); British High Commissioner to Malawi (2009–2011); British High Commissioner to the Seychelles (2007–2009)	
Neil Crompton	University	British Ambassador to Saudi Arabia (2020–)	
Kim Darroch	Hatfield	British Ambassador to the United States (2016–2019); National Security Advisor (2012–2015); UK Permanent Representative to the European Union (2007–2011)	
Matt Field	Van Mildert	British Ambassador to Bosnia and Herzegovina (2018–)	
David Fitton	Hatfield	British High Commissioner to Jamaica (2013–2017); British High Commissioner to the Bahamas (2013–2017)	
Alexandra Hall Hall	Collingwood	British Ambassador to Georgia (2013–2016)	
James Hennessy	King's	Her Majesty's Chief Inspector of Prisons (1982–1987); Governor of British Honduras (1980–1981); High Commissioner to Uganda (1973–1976); Ambassador to Rwanda (1973–1976)	
Paul Madden	?	British Ambassador to Japan (2017–); British High Commissioner to Australia (2011–2015); British High Commissioner to Singapore (2007–2011)	
Jane Marriott	University	British Ambassador to Yemen (2013-2015); High Commissioner to Kenya (2019–)	
Chris O'Connor	?	British Ambassador to Tunisia (2008–2013)	
Denis Osborne	University	British High Commissioner to Malawi (1987–1990)	
William Quantrill	Hatfield	British High Commissioner to Cameroon (1991–1995)	
Allan Ramsay	Graduate Society	British Ambassador to Lebanon (1988-1990); British Ambassador to Sudan (1990-1991); British Ambassador to Morocco (1992-1996)	
John Richmond	―	British Ambassador to Sudan (1965–1966); British Ambassador to Kuwait (1961–1963)	
James Roscoe	St John's	Acting British Ambassador to the United States (2025–)	
Michael Scott	King's	British Ambassador to Nepal (1974-1977); British High Commissioner to Malawi (1977-1979); British High Commissioner to Bangladesh (1980-1981)	
James Lyall Sharp	St Cuthbert's	British Ambassador to Azerbaijan (2019–); British Ambassador to Kazakhstan (2002–2005)	
Jan Thompson	Collingwood	British Ambassador to the Czech Republic (2013–2017)	
Jonathan Wilks	University	British Ambassador to Iraq (2017–); British Ambassador to Oman (2014–2017); British Ambassador to Yemen (2010–2011)	

Other countries
Name	College	Notes	Ref.
K. B. Asante	University	Ghanaian Ambassador to Belgium, Luxembourg, and the European Economic Community (1976–1978); Ghanaian Ambassador to Switzerland and Australia (1967–1972)	
Phyllis Kandie	?	Kenyan Ambassador to Belgium, Luxembourg and the European Union (2018–)	
Desra Percaya	Graduate Society	Ambassador of Indonesia to the United Kingdom (2020–); Permanent Representative of Indonesia to the United Nations (2012–2015)	
Samir Sumaidaie	King's	Iraqi Ambassador to the United States (2006–2011); Permanent Representative of Iraq to the United Nations (2004–2006)	

=== Civil Service ===
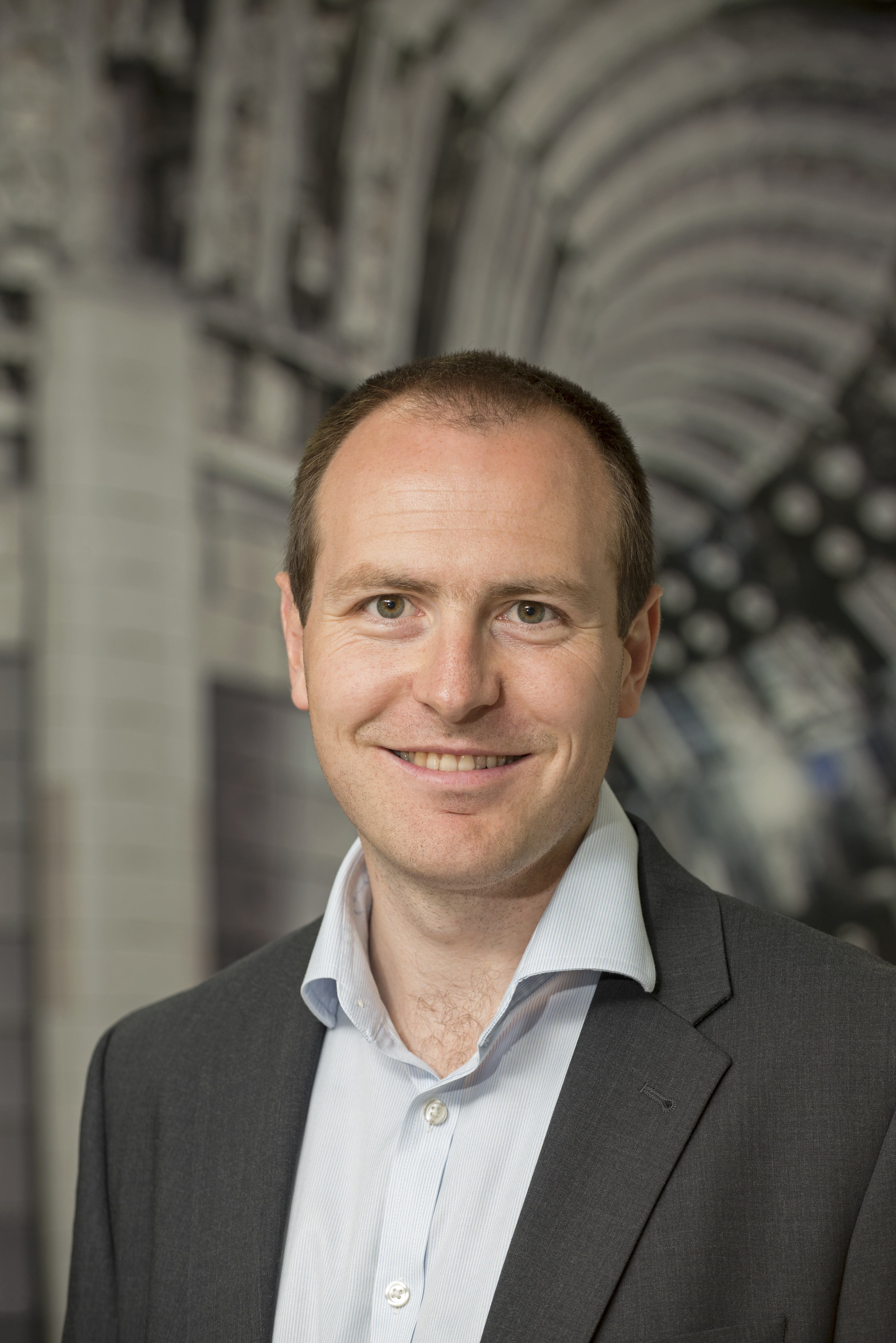
Ian Chapman

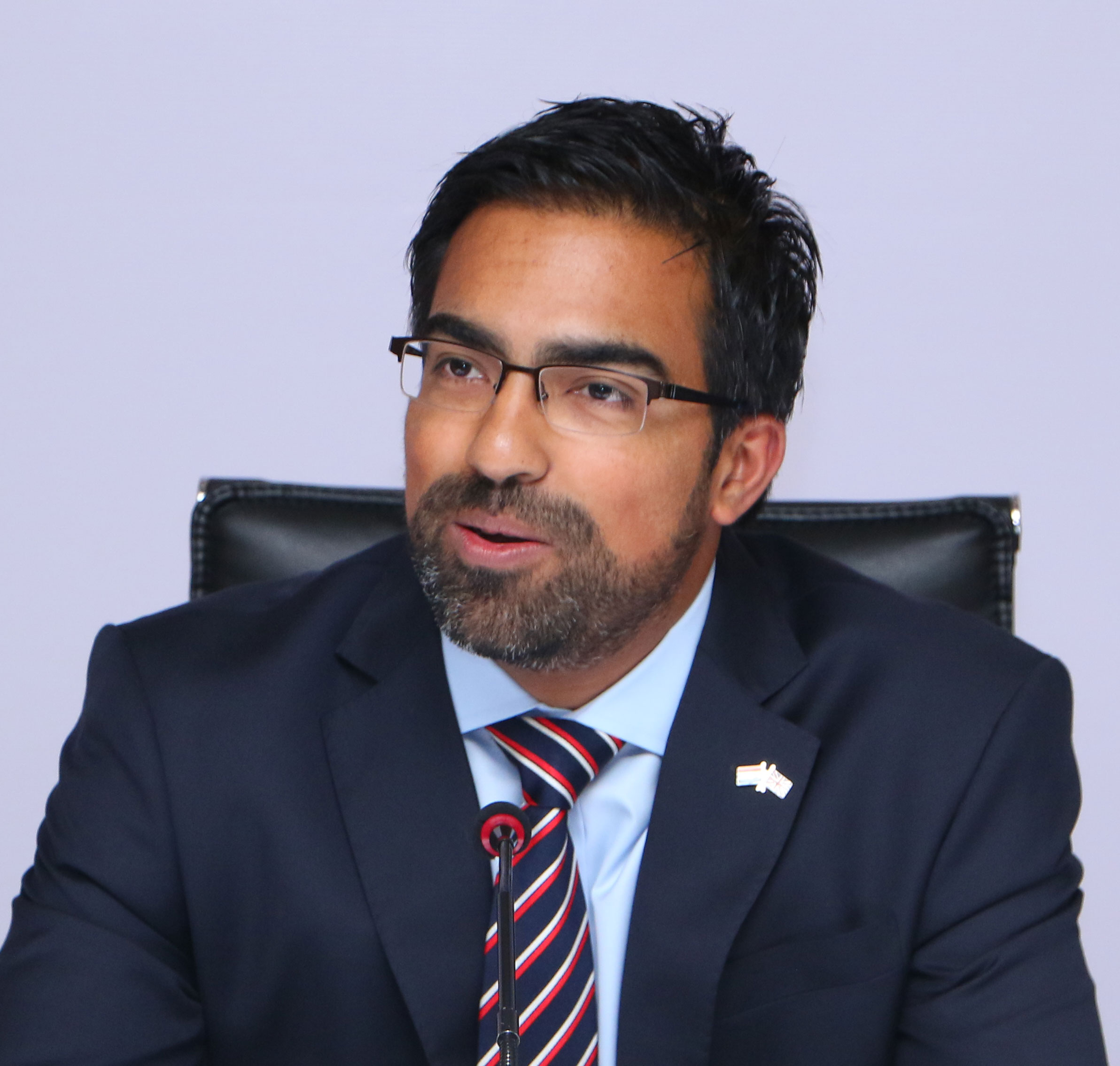
Kumar Iyer

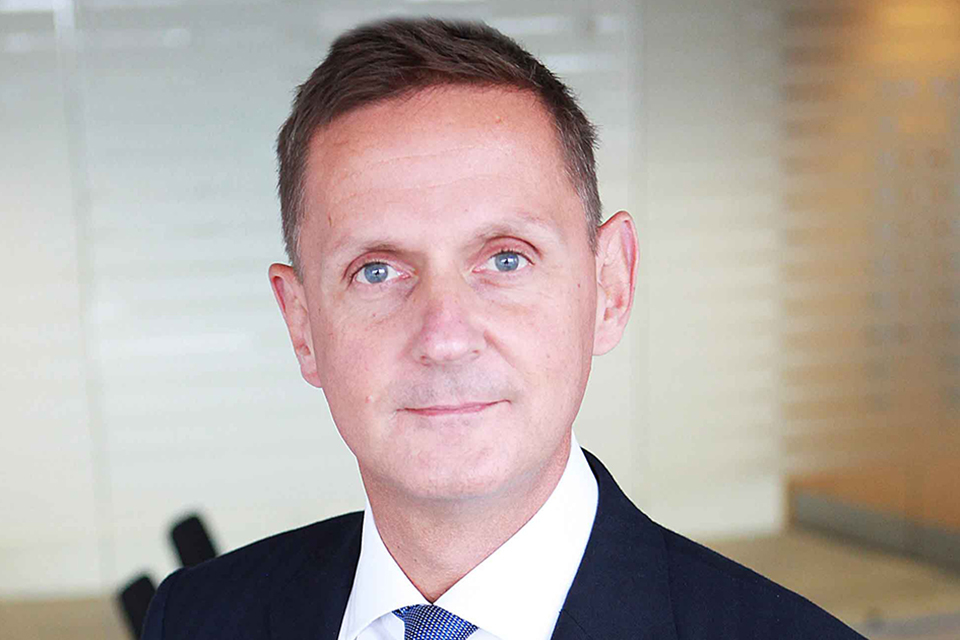
Jonathan Jones

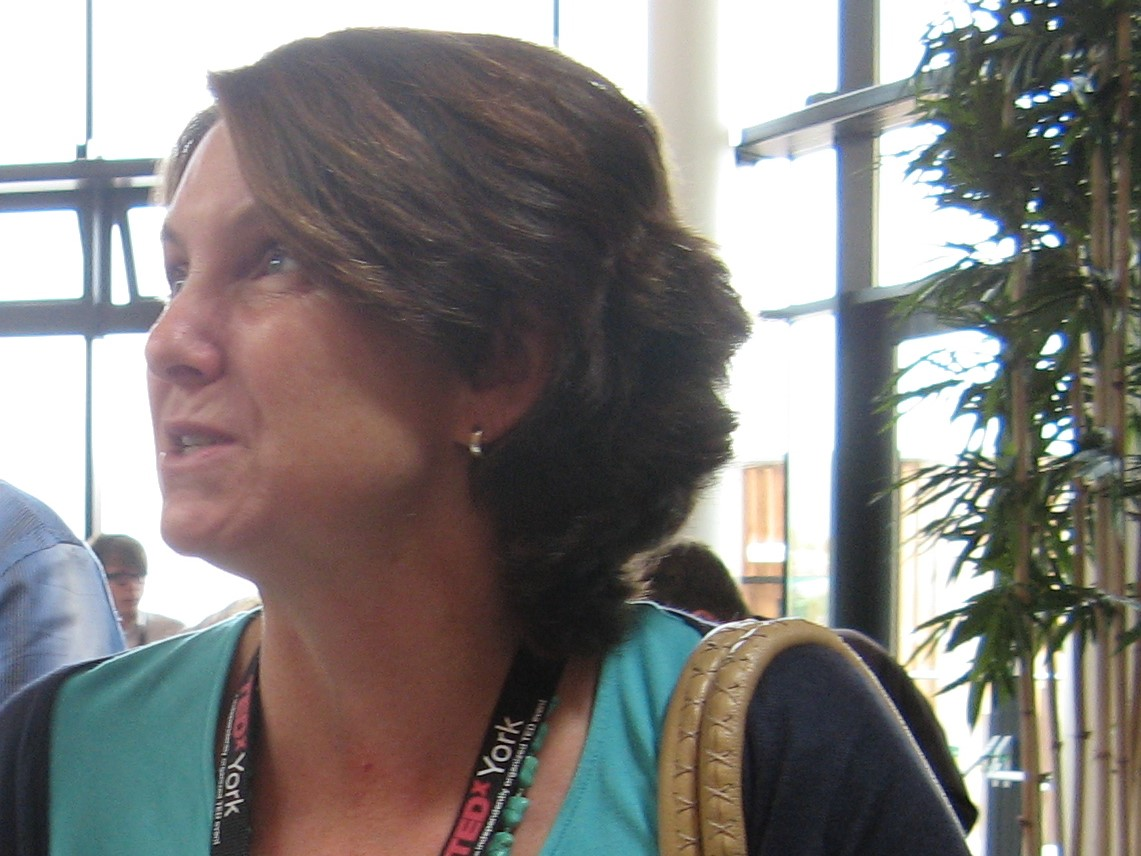
Nicola Spence

Home Civil Service
Name	College	Notes	Ref.
Adrian Brown	?	Director of Parliamentary Archives (2014–)	
Clare Cameron	University	Director, Defence Innovation, Ministry of Defence (2019–)	
Ian Chapman	Hild Bede	Chief Executive of the United Kingdom Atomic Energy Authority	
Shona Dunn	?	Second Permanent Secretary, Home Office (2018–2021)	
Kumar Iyer	University	Chief Economist, Foreign and Commonwealth Office (2019–)	
Jonathan Jones	St Chad's	Permanent Secretary, Government Legal Department (2014–2020)	
Richard Paniguian	Hatfield	Head of Defence & Security Organisation (2008–2015)	
Graham Savage	―	Education Officer, London County Council (1940–1951)	
Nicola Spence	St Aidan's	Chief Plant Health Officer, Department for Environment, Food and Rural Affairs (2014–)	
Mike Tomlinson	?	Chief Inspector at Ofsted (2000–2002)	

Overseas Civil Service
Name	College	Notes	Ref.
John Rawling Todd	Hatfield	Secretary for Housing, British Hong Kong (1986–1988)	
John Francis Yaxley	Hatfield	Hong Kong Commissioner in London (1989–1993)	

=== Others ===
Politicians overseas
Name	College	Notes	Ref.
Crispin Adeniyi-Jones	College of Medicine	President of Nigerian National Democratic Party; Member of Legislative Council of Nigeria (1923–1938)	
Aryo Djojohadikusumo	?	Member of the House of Representatives of Indonesia (2014–2019)	
Charles Bruzon	Ushaw	Member of the Gibraltar Parliament (2002–2013)	
Henry Rawlingson Carr	?	Member of Legislative Council of Nigeria (1933–1944)	
John Douglas	University	Premier of Queensland (1877–1879)	
François Jackman	?	Barbadian ambassador to UN and China	
Kinfe Gebremedhin	Hatfield	Chief of Security and Immigration, Ethiopia	
Kerryann Ifill	?	President of the Senate of Barbados (2012–2018)	
Norman Lacy	Ustinov	Minister for the Arts and Minister of Educational Services, State of Victoria, Australia (1979–1982)	
Maszlee Malik	?	Malaysian Minister of Education (2018–2020)	
Milton Margai	Fourah Bay/College of Medicine	Prime Minister of Sierra Leone (1958–1964)	
Steven Marshall	?	Premier of South Australia (2018–2022)	
Mark Pearson	St Chad's	Member of the New Hampshire House of Representatives (2016–)	
Maurice Berkeley Portman	University	Member of the Legislative Assembly of the Province of Canada for East Middlesex (1861–1863)	
Elsie Tu	Armstrong	Member of the Legislative Council of Hong Kong (1988–1995); Member of the Urban Council of Hong Kong (1963–1995)	
Emmanuel Tumusiime-Mutebile	Cuths	Governor of the Bank of Uganda (2001-2022)	
Tom Weidig	?	Member of the Luxembourg Chamber of Deputies (2023–)	
Ibrahim bin Ali bin Issa Al Hassan Al Mohannadi	?	Minister of Justice and Minister of State for Cabinet Affairs (2024–)	

Campaigners and activists
Name	College	Notes	Ref.
Rodney Atkinson	Collingwood	Eurosceptic campaigner; 1997 general election Referendum Party candidate for North West Durham, 1999 European Elections UK Independence Party (UKIP) candidate for the North East Region	
Tracy Philipps	Hatfield	Secretary-General of the International Union for Conservation of Nature (1955–1958)	
Francis Ambrose Ridley	Non-Collegiate	President of the National Secular Society (1951–1963)	
Charles Andrew Smith	Armstrong	Chairman of the Independent Labour Party (1939–1941); Chairman of the Common Wealth Party (1945–1947)	
Kevin Watkins	University	Chief Executive of Save the Children (2016–)	

== Religion ==
=== Archbishops and Primates ===
Walter Adams

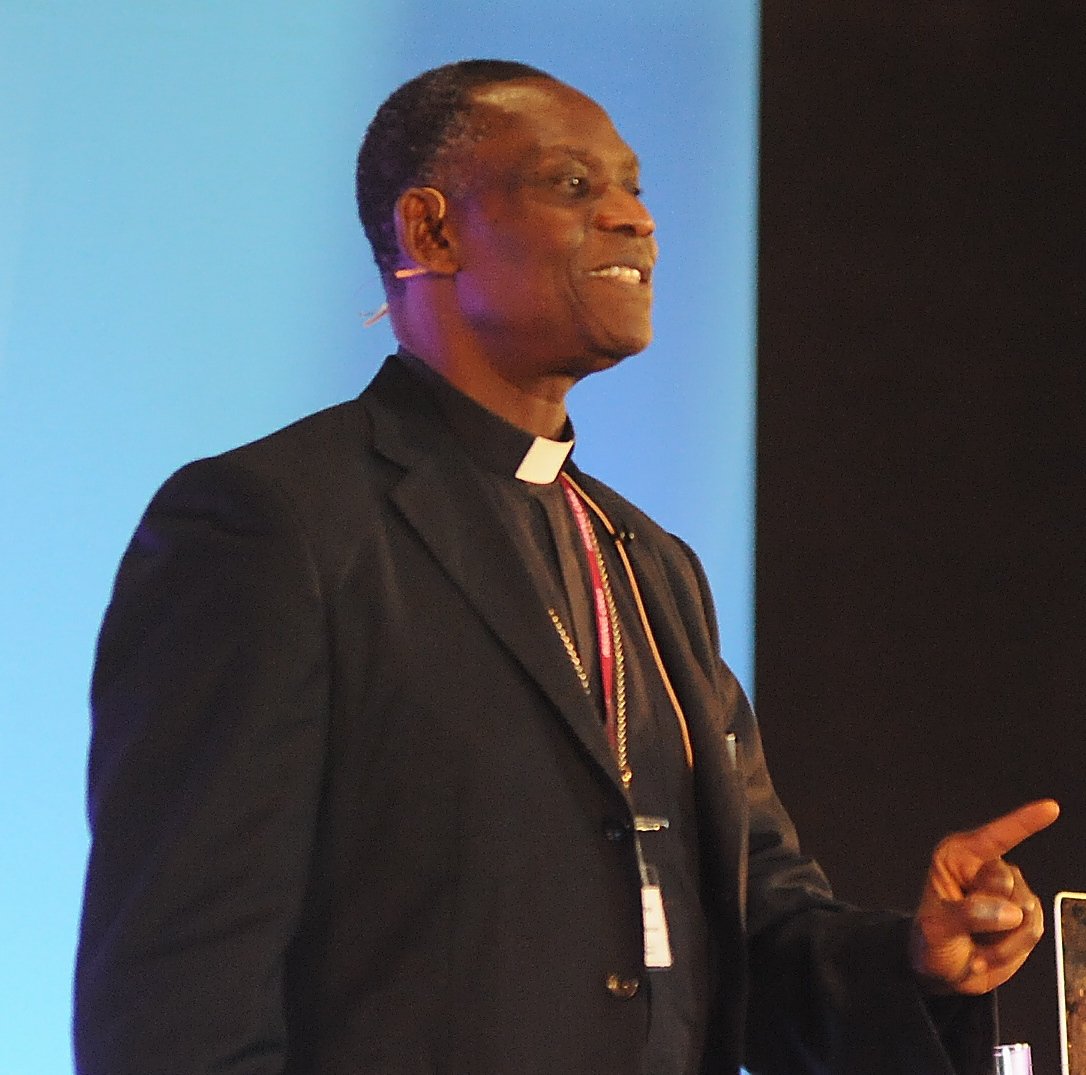
Josiah Idowu-Fearon

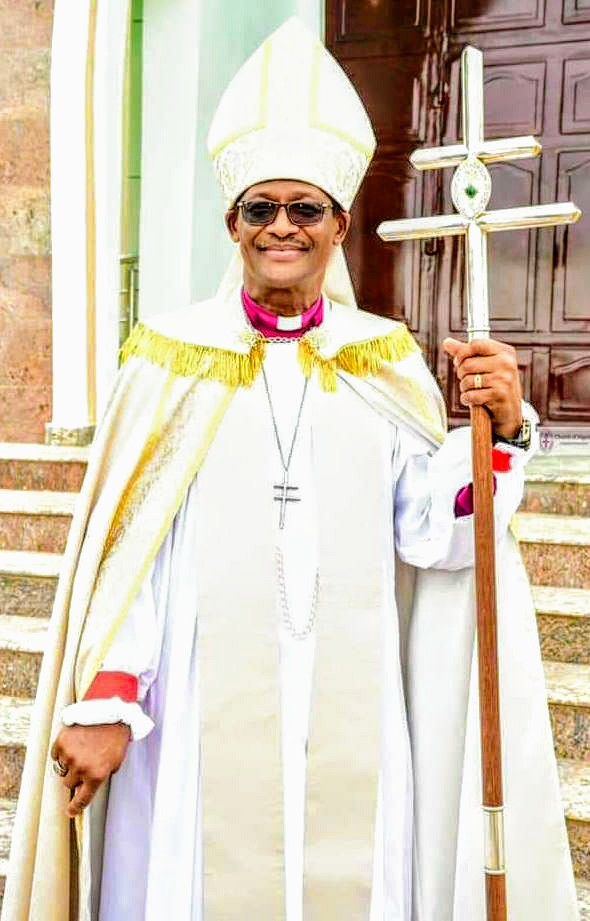
Henry Ndukuba

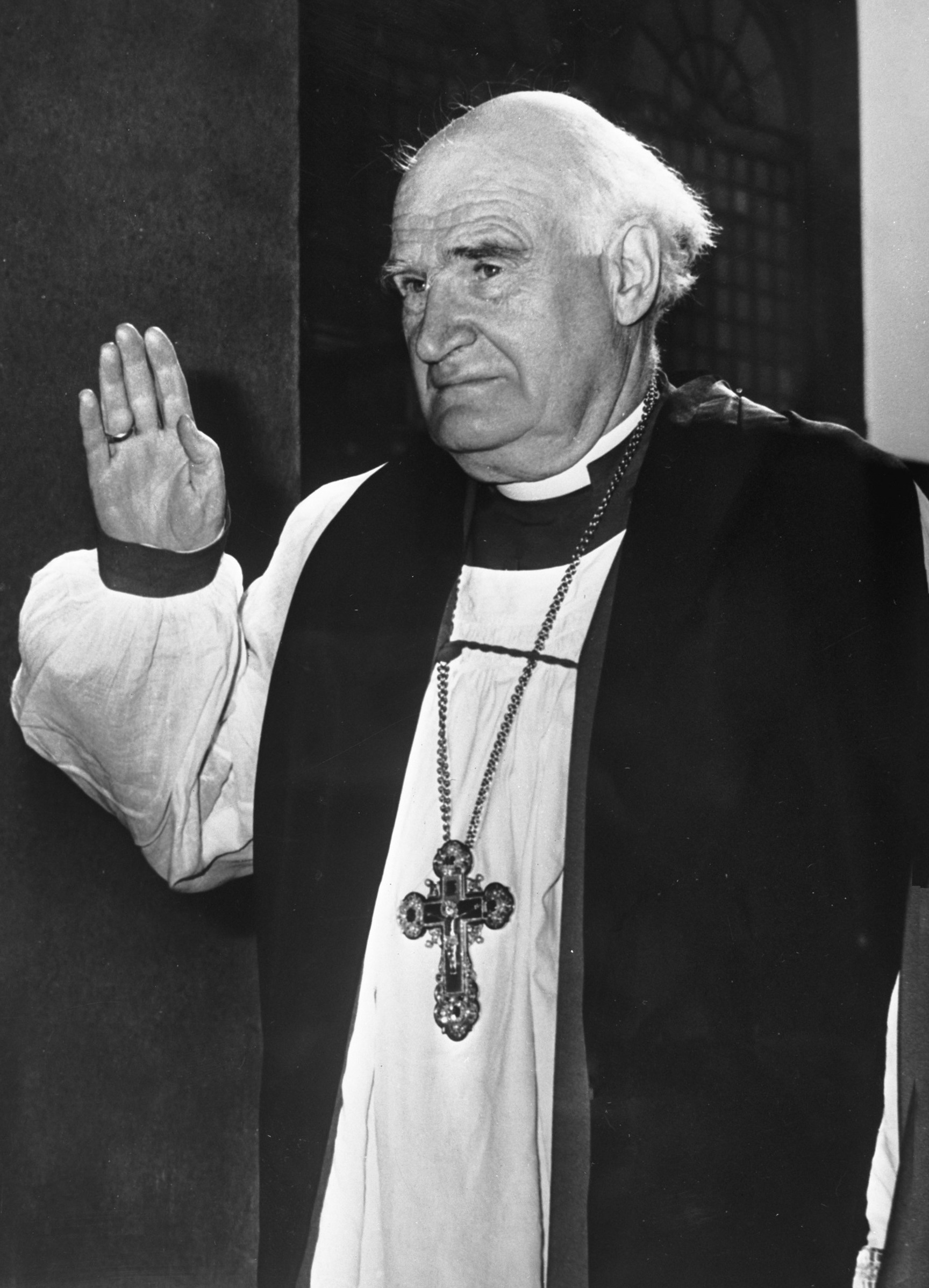
Michael Ramsey

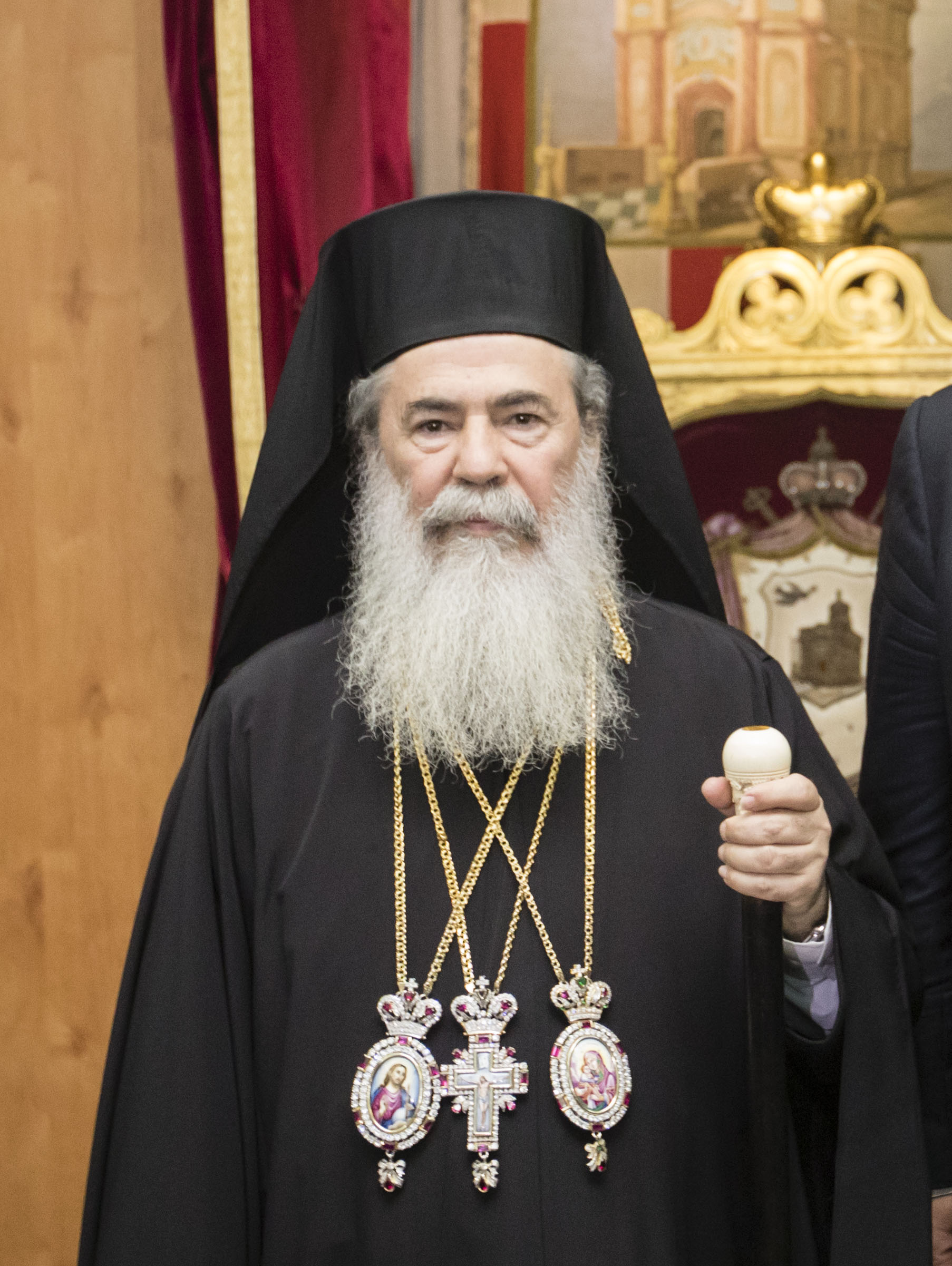
Patriarch Theophilos III of Jerusalem

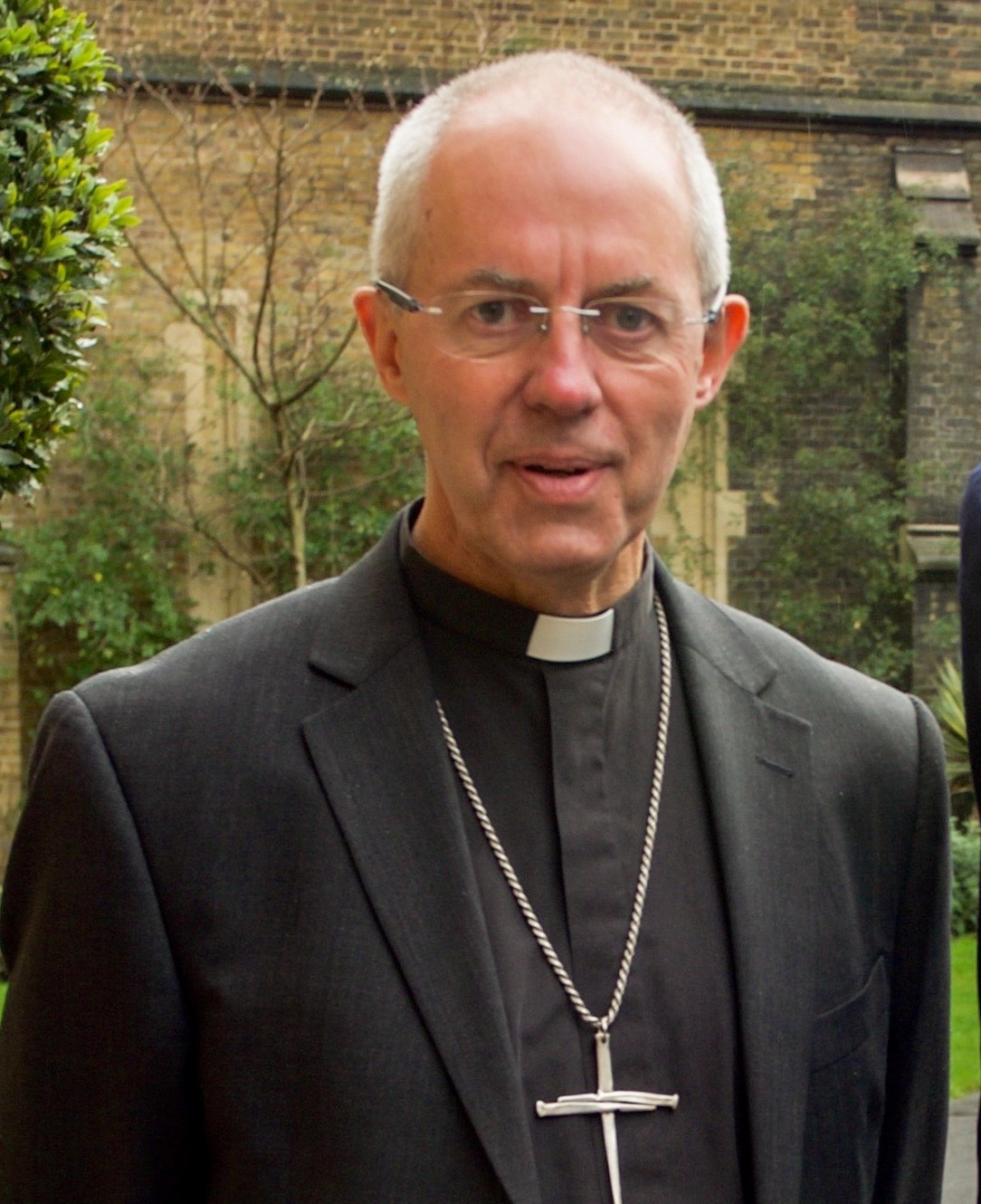
Justin Welby

Name	College	Notes	Ref.
Walter Robert Adams	University	Archbishop of Yukon (1947–1952)	
Drexel Gomez	St Chad's	Archbishop of the West Indies (1998–2009)	
Alastair Haggart	Hatfield	Primus of the Scottish Episcopal Church (1977–1985)	
Josiah Idowu-Fearon	St John's	Archbishop of Kaduna (2002–2008)	
James Horstead	University	Archbishop of West Africa (1955–1961)	
Edward Hutson	Codrington	Archbishop of the West Indies (1922–1936)	
Henry Ndukuba	St John's	Primate of the Anglican Church of Nigeria (2020–)	
Michael Ramsey	—	Van Mildert Professor of Divinity (1940–1950); Archbishop of Canterbury (1961–1974)	
Theophilos III	University	Patriarch of the Orthodox Church of Jerusalem (2005–)	
Justin Welby	St John's	Archbishop of Canterbury (2013–2025)	
John Wilson	Ushaw	Archbishop of Southwark (2019–)	

=== Bishops ===
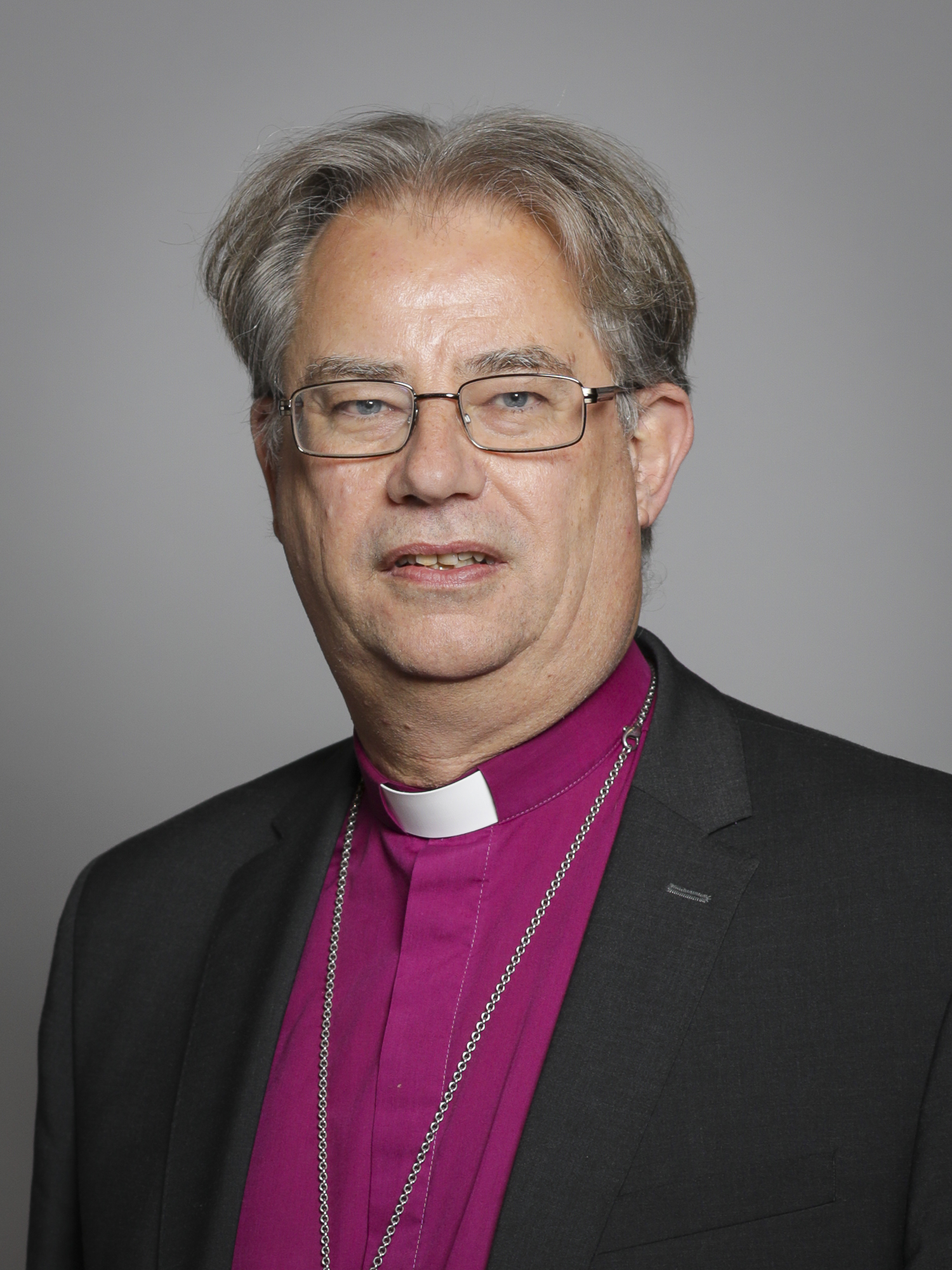
Steven Croft

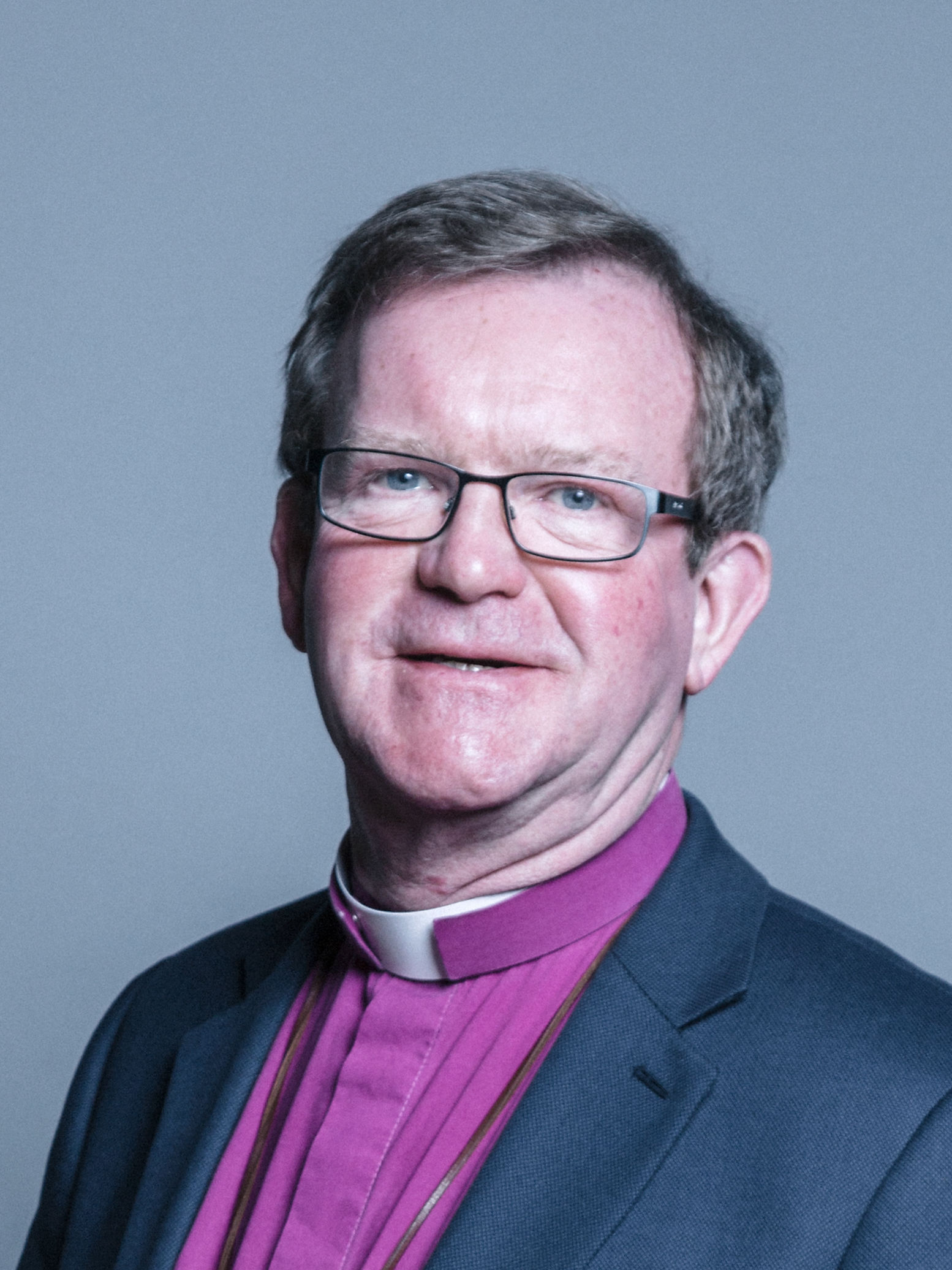
Christopher Foster

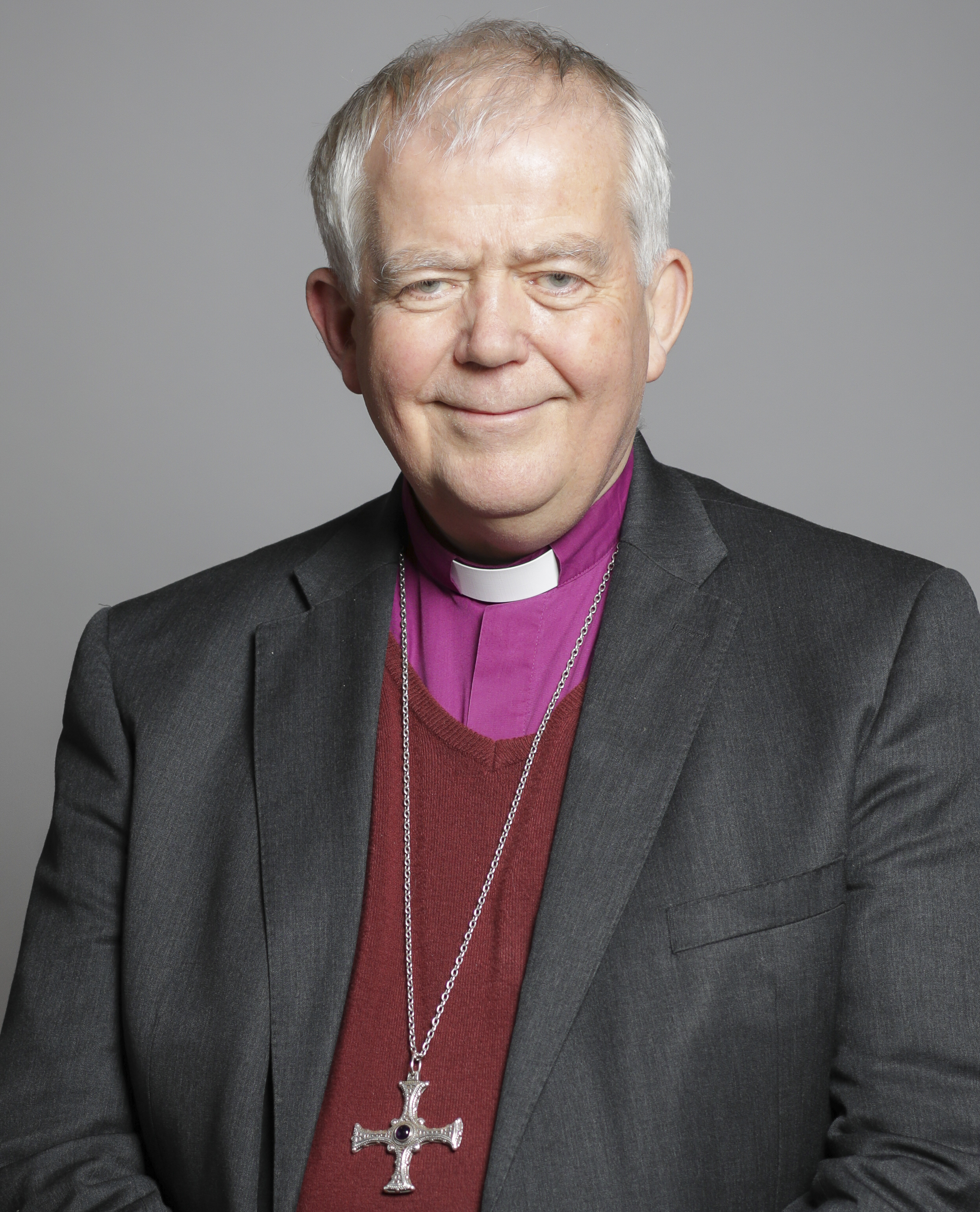
Nick Holtam

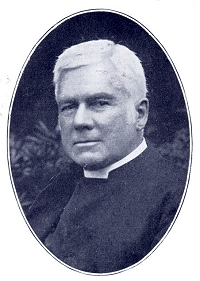
Walsham How

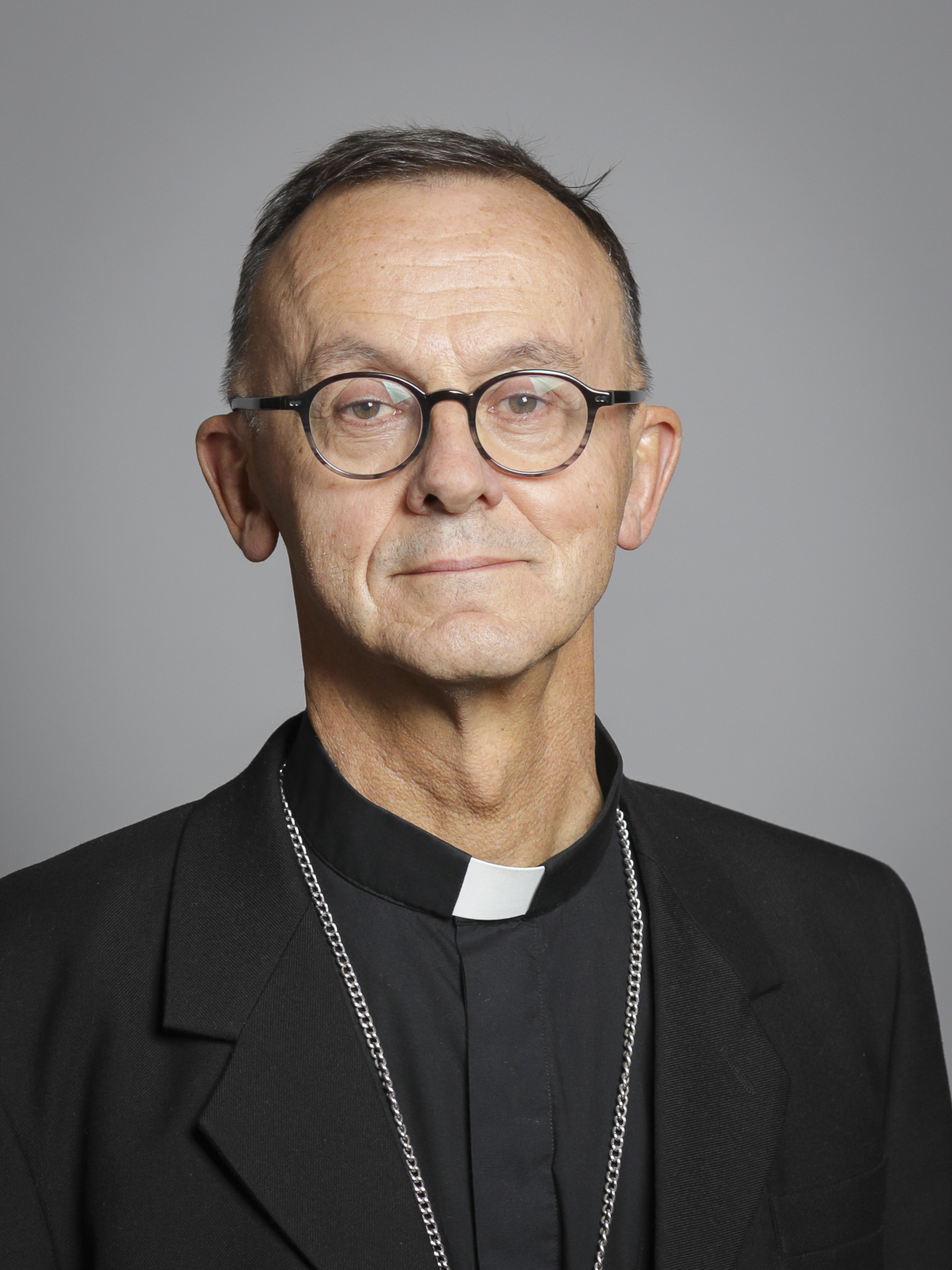
John Inge

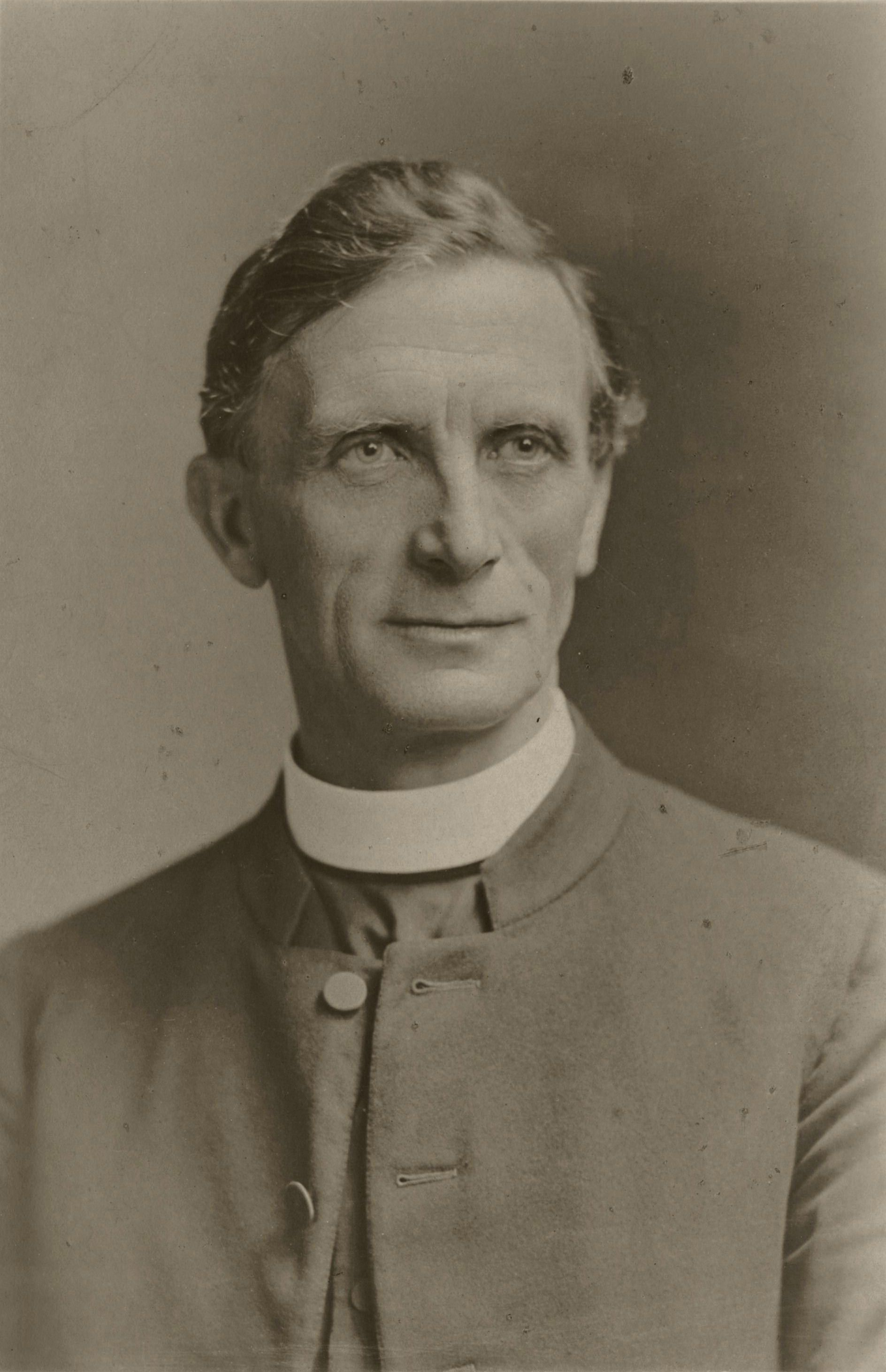
William Stanton Jones

Name	College	Notes	Ref.
Thomas Makinson Armour	St Chad's	Bishop of Wangaratta	
Robert Ronald Atwell	St John's	Bishop of Stockport	
Clifford Barker	St Chad's	Bishop of Whitby (1976–1983); Bishop of Selby (1983–1991)	
Frederic Beaven	University	Bishop of Mashonaland (1911–1925)	
James Harold Bell	St John's	Bishop of Knaresborough	
David Williams Bentley	St Cuthbert's	Bishop of Barbados	
Richard Blackburn	St John's	Bishop of Warrington	
John Boys	Hatfield	Bishop of Kimberley and Kuruman	
Ronald Brown	?	Bishop of Birkenhead	
Mark Bryant	St John's	Bishop of Jarrow	
Cyril Bulley	St Chad's	Bishop of Penrith (1959–1966); Bishop of Carlisle (1966–1972)	
Edmund Capper	St Cuthert's	Bishop of St Helena (1967–1973)	
Gething Caulton	St Chad's	Bishop of Melanesia	
Alan Chesters	St Chad's	Bishop of Blackburn (1989–2003)	
Steven Croft	St John's	Bishop of Sheffield (2008–2016); Bishop of Oxford (2016–)	
Harold Darby	?	Bishop of Sherwood (1975–1988)	
David Edwardes	Hatfield	Bishop of Bangor (1944–1949)	
Mark Davies	Ushaw	Roman Catholic Bishop of Shrewsbury (2010–)	
Peter Dawes	Hatfield	Bishop of Derby (1988–1995)	
Michael Doe		Bishop of Swindon (1994–2001)	
Arthur Douglas	Hatfield	Bishop of Aberdeen and Orkney (1883–1905)	
Christopher Paul	St John's	Bishop of Bolton	
Christopher Foster	University	Bishop of Portsmouth	
George Frodsham	University	Bishop of North Queensland (1902–1913)	
John Gaisford	St Chad's	Bishop of Beverley (1994–2000)	
Michael Frederick	St John's	Bishop of Doncaster (1993–1999)	
John Gladwin	St John's	Bishop of Chelmsford (2004–2009)	
John Goddard	St Chad's	Bishop of Burnley (2000–2014)	
Frederick Goldie	Hatfield	Bishop of Glasgow and Galloway (1974–1980)	
Temple Hamlyn	Hatfield	Bishop of Accra (1908–1910)	
Clive Handford	Hatfield	Bishop in Cyprus and the Gulf (1997–2007)	
Ralph Hawkins	Hatfield	Bishop of Bunbury (1957–1977)	
Robert Hay	Hatfield	Bishop of Tasmania (1919–1943)	
Samuel Heaslett	University	Bishop of South Tokyo (1921–1941)	
Michael Henshall	St Chad's	Bishop Suffragan of Warrington (1976–96)	
George Hills	University	Bishop of British Columbia (1859–1892)	
Nick Holtam	Collingwood	Bishop of Salisbury	
William Walsham How	University	Bishop of Wakefield (1889–1897)	
John Howe	St Chad's	Bishop of St Andrews, Dunkeld and Dunblane (1955–1969)	
John Taylor Hughes	Bede	Bishop of Croydon (1956–1977)	
John Inge	St Chad's	Bishop of Worcester (2007–)	
Michael Ipgrave	St Chad's	Bishop of Woolwich (2012–2016); Bishop of Lichfield (2016–)	
Francis Johnston	Hatfield	Bishop of Egypt (1952–1958)	
Thomas Sherwood Jones	Non-Collegiate	Bishop of Hulme (1930–1945)	
William Stanton Jones	Non-Collegiate	Bishop of Sodor and Man (1928–1942)	
Donald Knowles	Hatfield	Bishop of Antigua (1953–1969)	
Libby Lane	St John's	Bishop of Stockport (2015–2019)	
James Linton	St John's	Bishop in Persia (1917–1935)	
Evered Lunt	University	Bishop of Stepney (1957–1968)	
Peter Maurice	St Chad's	Bishop of Taunton	
Sandy Millar	St John's	Bishop of the Church of Uganda, serving as Assistant Bishop for Mission in the Diocese of London	
Cecil Norgate	St Chad's	Bishop of Masasi (1984–1992)	
Robert Paterson	St John's	Bishop of Sodor and Man (2008–2016)	
Geoffrey Seagrave Pearson	St John's	Bishop of Lancaster (2006–2017)	
Anthony Russell	St Chad's	Bishop of Dorchester (1988–2000); Bishop of Ely (2000–2010)	
Mark Rylands	Hild Bede	Bishop of Shrewsbury (2009–2018)	
Frank Sargeant	St John's	Bishop of Stockport (1984–1994); Bishop at Lambeth (1994–1999)	
John Saxbee	St John's	Bishop of Ludlow (1994–2002); Bishop of Lincoln (2002–2011)	
Bertram Simpson	University	Bishop of Kensington (1932–1942); Bishop of Southwark (1942–1959)	
William Nigel Stock	St Cuthbert's	Bishop of Stockport (2000–2007); Bishop of St Edmundsbury and Ipswich (2007–2013); Bishop at Lambeth (2013–2017); Bishop to the Forces and Bishop for the Falkland Islands (2014–2017)	
Cyril Swaby	St John's	Bishop of Jamaica (1968–1975)	
Proctor Swaby	Hatfield	Bishop of Guyana (1893–1899); Bishop of Barbados and the Windward Islands (1899–1916)	
Gordon Tindall	Hatfield	Bishop of Grahamstown (1964–1969)	
John Tinsley	St John's	Bishop of Bristol (1975–1985)	
Michael Turnbull	St John's	Bishop of Durham (1994–2003)	
James Turner	University	Bishop of Grafton and Armidale (1869–1893)	
Dennis Victor	Hatfield	Bishop of Lebombo	
Michael Volland	St John's	Bishop of Birmingham (2023–)	
Martin Warner	St Chad's	Bishop of Chichester (2012–)	
Martin Wharton	Van Mildert	Bishop of Newcastle (1997–2014)	
Alison White	St Aidan's/St John's	Bishop of Hull	
Alan Williams	Grey	Bishop of Brentwood (2014–)	
Paul Gavin Williams	Grey	Bishop of Kensington (2009–2015); Bishop of Southwell and Nottingham (2015–)	
Pete Wilcox	St John's	Bishop of Sheffield (2017–)	

=== Archdeacons ===
Name	College	Notes	Ref.
Henry Carden	Hatfield	Archdeacon of Lahore (1929–1934)	
Alexander Chisholm	Hatfield	Archdeacon of Carlisle (1947–1958)	
Richard Blundell Comins	Hatfield	Archdeacon of Northern Melanesia (1900–1910)	
Herbert Edmonds	Hatfield	Archdeacon of Madras (1937–1940)	
Hugh Edwardes	Hatfield	Archdeacon of Port Elizabeth (1933–1944)	
Richard Gillings	St Chad's	Archdeacon of Macclesfield (1994–2004)	
Glyndwr Hackett	Hatfield	Archdeacon of Monmouth (2001–2008)	
Thomas Hodgson	Hatfield	Archdeacon of Huntingdon (1915–1921)	
Robert Jones	Hatfield	Archdeacon of Worcester (2014–)	
George MacDermott	Hatfield	Archdeacon of Norwich (1921–1938)	
Henry Marriott	Hatfield	Archdeacon of Bermuda (1925–1951)	
Frederic Murray	Hatfield	Archdeacon of Belize (1907–1918)	
Andrew Ritchie	Hatfield	Archdeacon of Surrey (1949–1955)	
Morris Rodham	Hatfield	Archdeacon of Warwick (2010–2019)	
Richard Ross-Lewin	Hatfield	Archdeacon of Limerick (1919–1921)	
Edward Seager	Hatfield	Archdeacon of Dorset (1955–1974)	
Andrew Spens of Craigsanquhar	Hatfield	Archdeacon of Lahore (1892–1900)	
Basil Stratton	Hatfield	Archdeacon of Lichfield (1959–1974)	
Paul Wheatley	?	Archdeacon of Sherborne (1991–2003)	
David Williams	Hatfield	Archdeacon of Cardigan (1928–1936)	

=== Deans ===
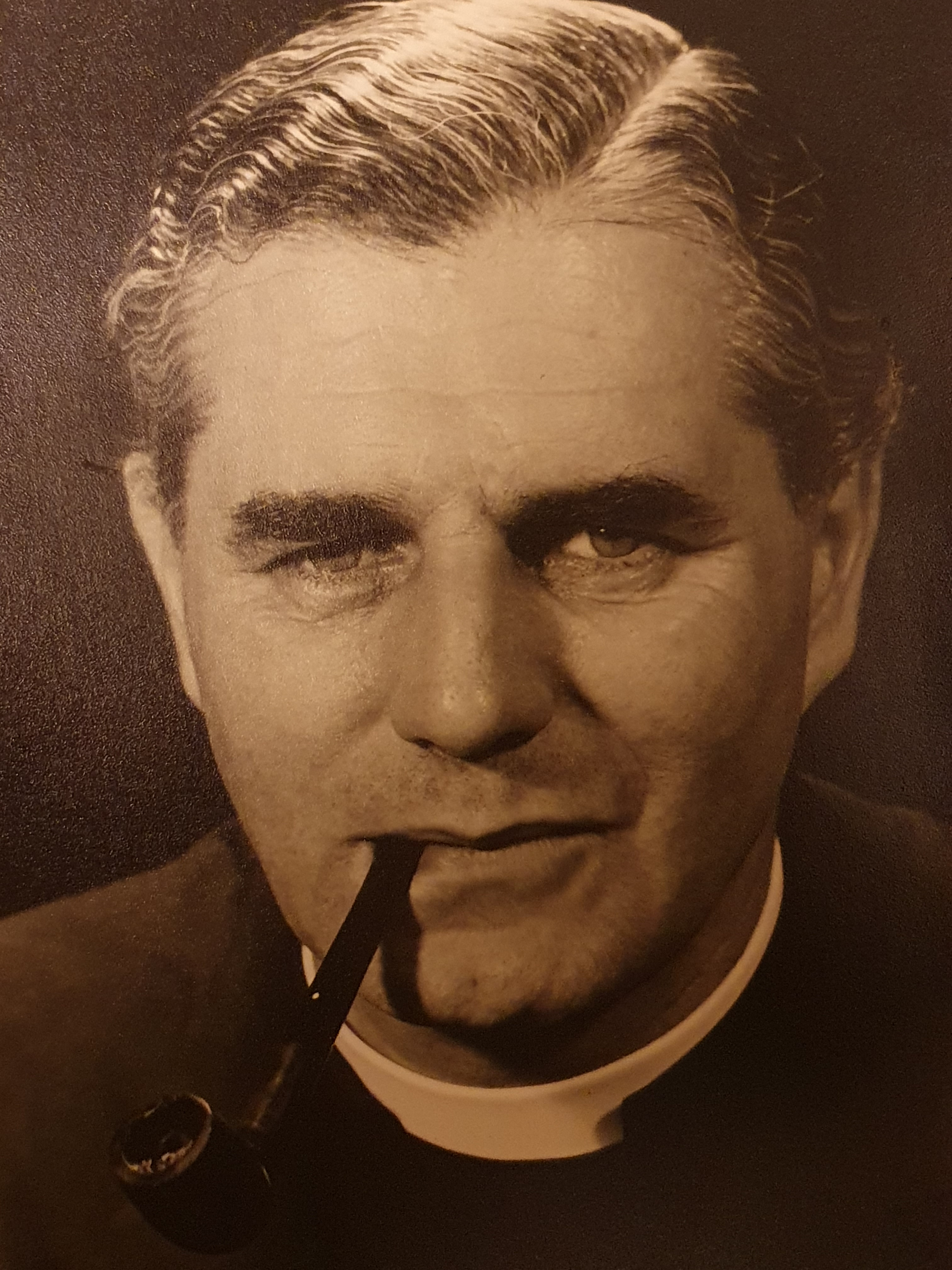
Bill Baddeley

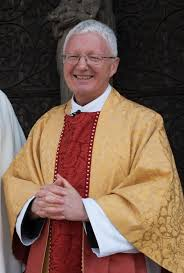
Adrian Dorber

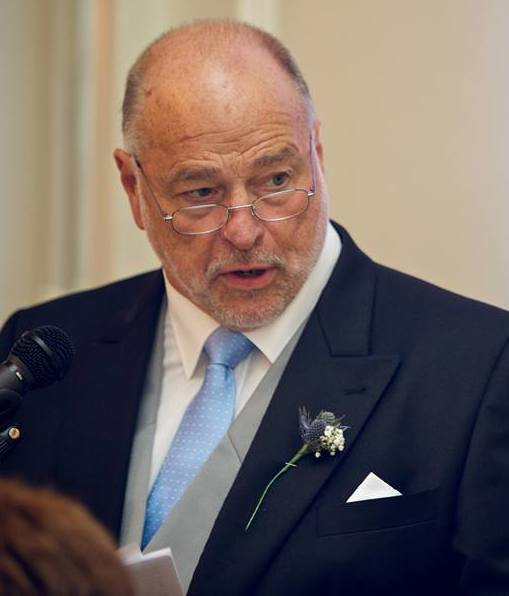
Jonathan Draper

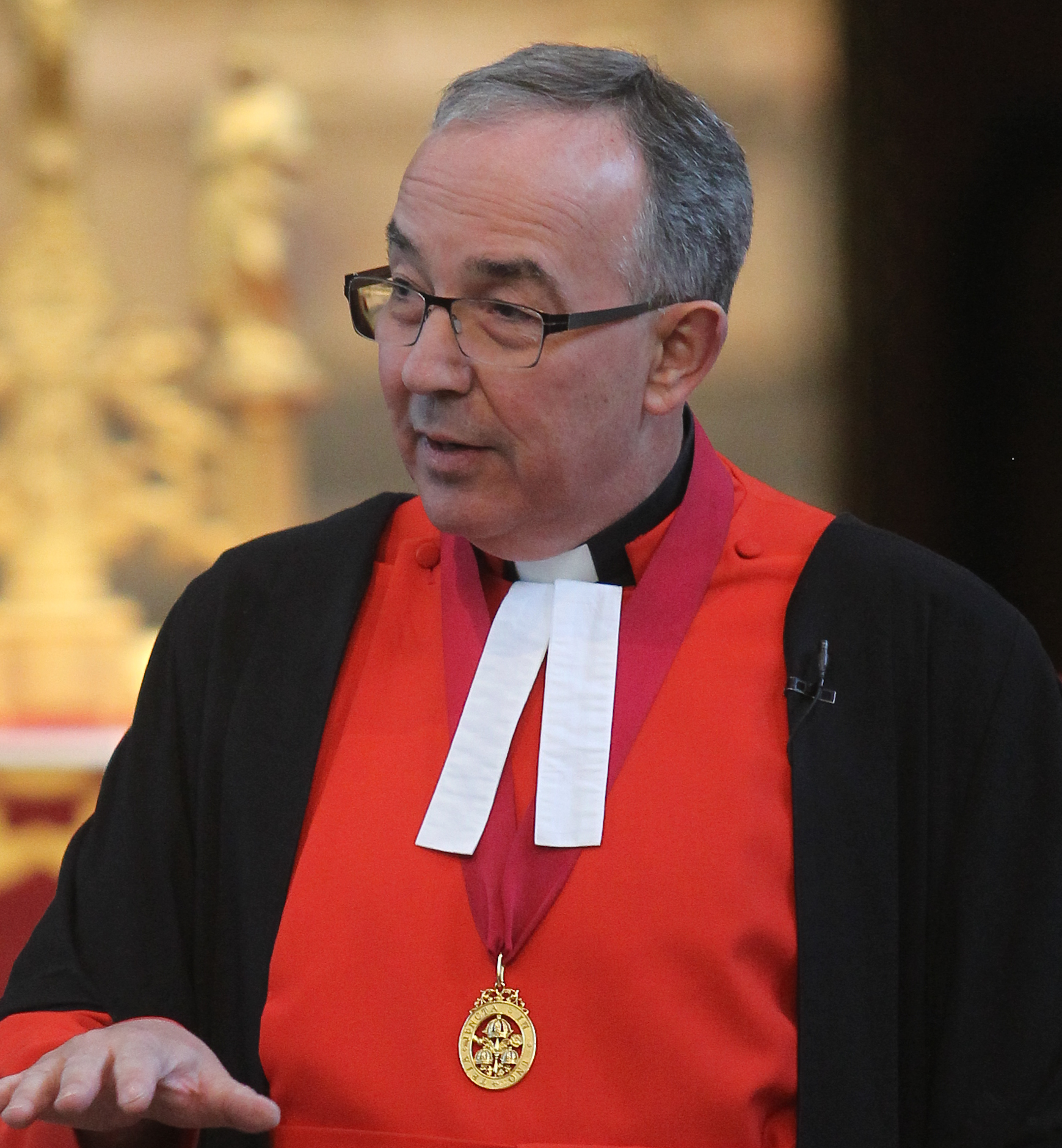
John Hall

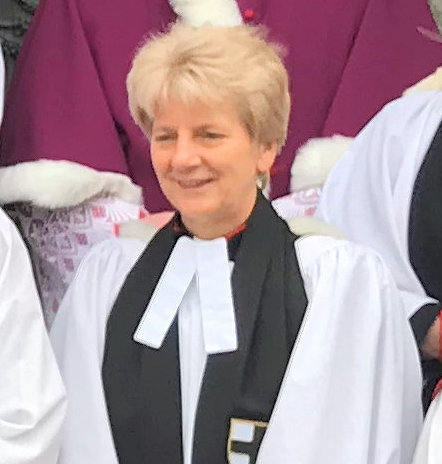
Jane Hedges

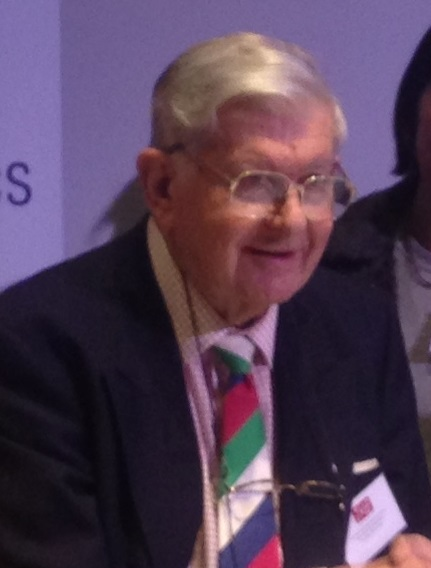
Edward Shotter

Name	College	Notes	Ref.
Bill Baddeley	St Chad's	Dean of Brisbane (1958–1967)	
John Barker	?	Dean of Cloyne (1973–1984)	
Dominic Barrington	Hatfield	Dean of York (2022–)	
Adrian Dorber	St John's	Dean of Lichfield (2005–2023)	
Jonathan Draper	St John's	Dean of Exeter (2012–2017)	
Edward Frossard	University	Dean of Guernsey (1947–1967)	
John Robert Hall	St Chad's	Dean of Westminster (2006–2019)	
Jane Hedges	St John's	Dean of Norwich (2014–)	
Roderick Mackay	Hatfield	Dean of Edinburgh (1939-1954)	
Geoff Miller	?	Dean of Newcastle (2018–)	
John Seaford	St Chad's	Dean of Jersey (1993–2005)	
Edward Shotter	?	Dean of Rochester (1989–2003)	
Michael Tavinor	University	Dean of Hereford (2002–2021)	

=== Other clerics ===
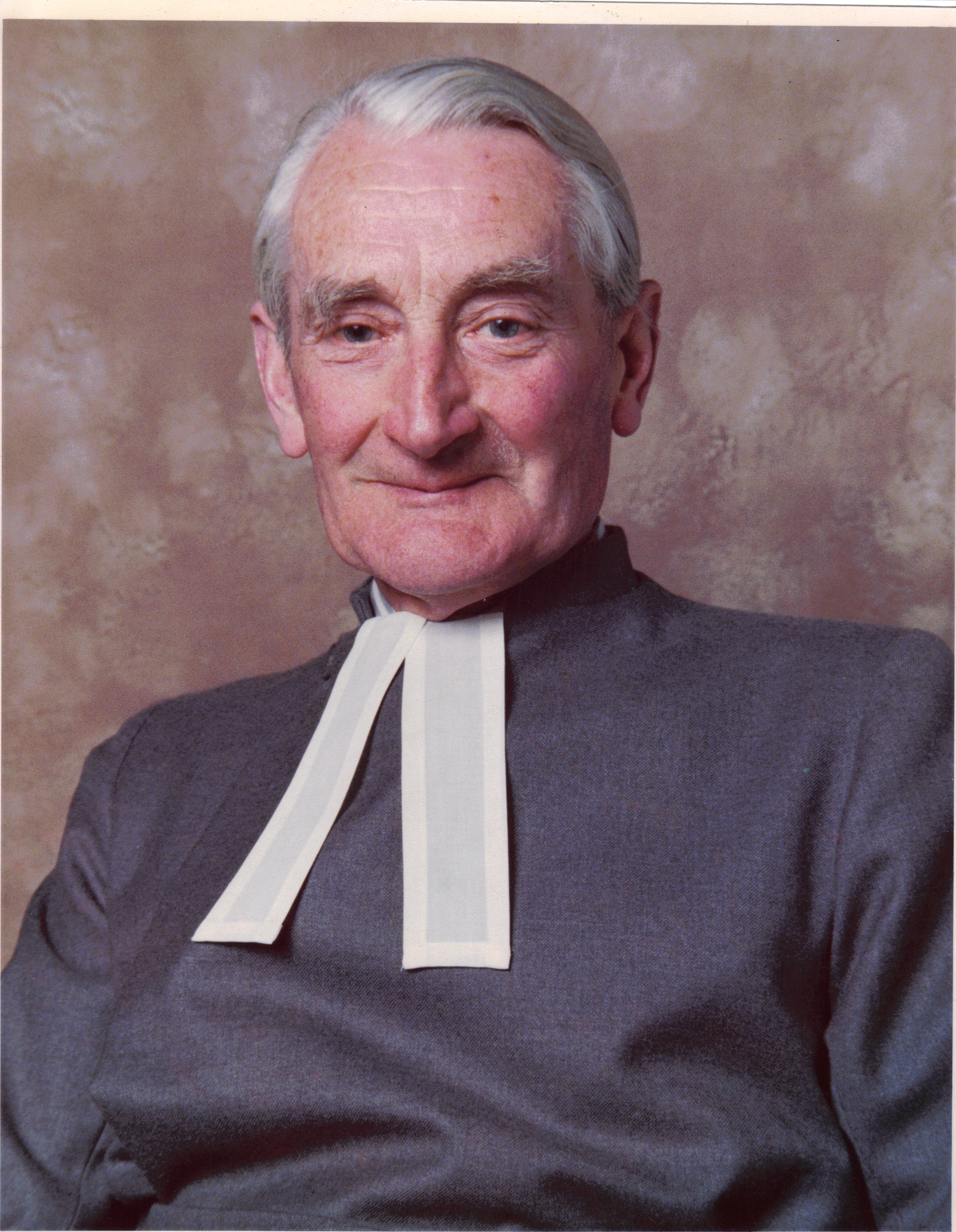
Ronald Beddoes

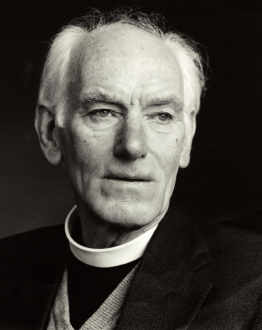
John McManners

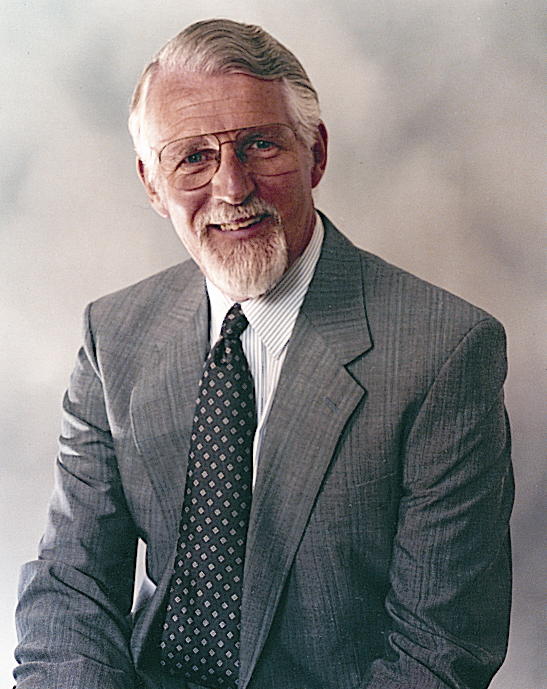
David Pawson

Leonard Sharland

Stephen Warner

Name	College	Notes	Ref.
Peter Adam	?	Principal of Ridley College (2002–2012)	
Ronald Beddoes	St Chad's	Provost of Derby (1953–1981)	
Joseph Cassidy	—	Principal of St Chad's College (1997–2015), Non-Residentiary Canon of Durham Cathedral (2001–2015)	
George Dragas	?	Professor of Patristics at Hellenic College Holy Cross Greek Orthodox School of Theology	
John Galbraith Graham	—	Chaplain and Tutor at St Chad's College (1949–1952); crossword puzzle writer, 'Araucaria' of The Guardian	
Robert Hornby	University	Held Curacy at Wakefield and Flaxton, noted antiquarian	
Francis ffolkes, 5th Baronet	Hatfield	Rector of Hillington, Norfolk, Chaplain-in-Ordinary to King George V	
Alan Horsley	St Chad's	Provost of St Andrew's Cathedral, Inverness (1988–1991)	
William Kay	Hatfield	Provost of Blackburn Cathedral (1936–1961)	
John Anthony McGuckin	Ushaw	Nielsen Professor of Church History, Union Theological Seminary	
Hugh McIntosh	Hatfield	Provost of St Mary's Cathedral, Glasgow (1966–1970)	
John McManners	St Chad's	Regius Professor of Ecclesiastical History, University of Oxford (1972–1984)	
Iain Murray	Bede	Founder of Banner of Truth Trust	
David Pawson	King's	Arminianism minister and Bible teacher	
Leonard Sharland	St John's	CMS missionary in Southern Sudan; Canon of Khartoum (1951–1958)	
Richard Turnbull	St John's	Principal of Wycliffe Hall, Oxford (2005–2012)	
Stephen Warner	University	Rector of Holy Trinity, Eastbourne	
Bill Williams	Hatfield	Provost of Coventry Cathedral (1958–1981)	

== Royalty ==
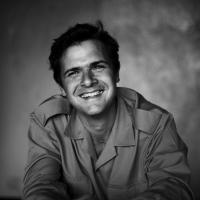
Emmanuel de Merode

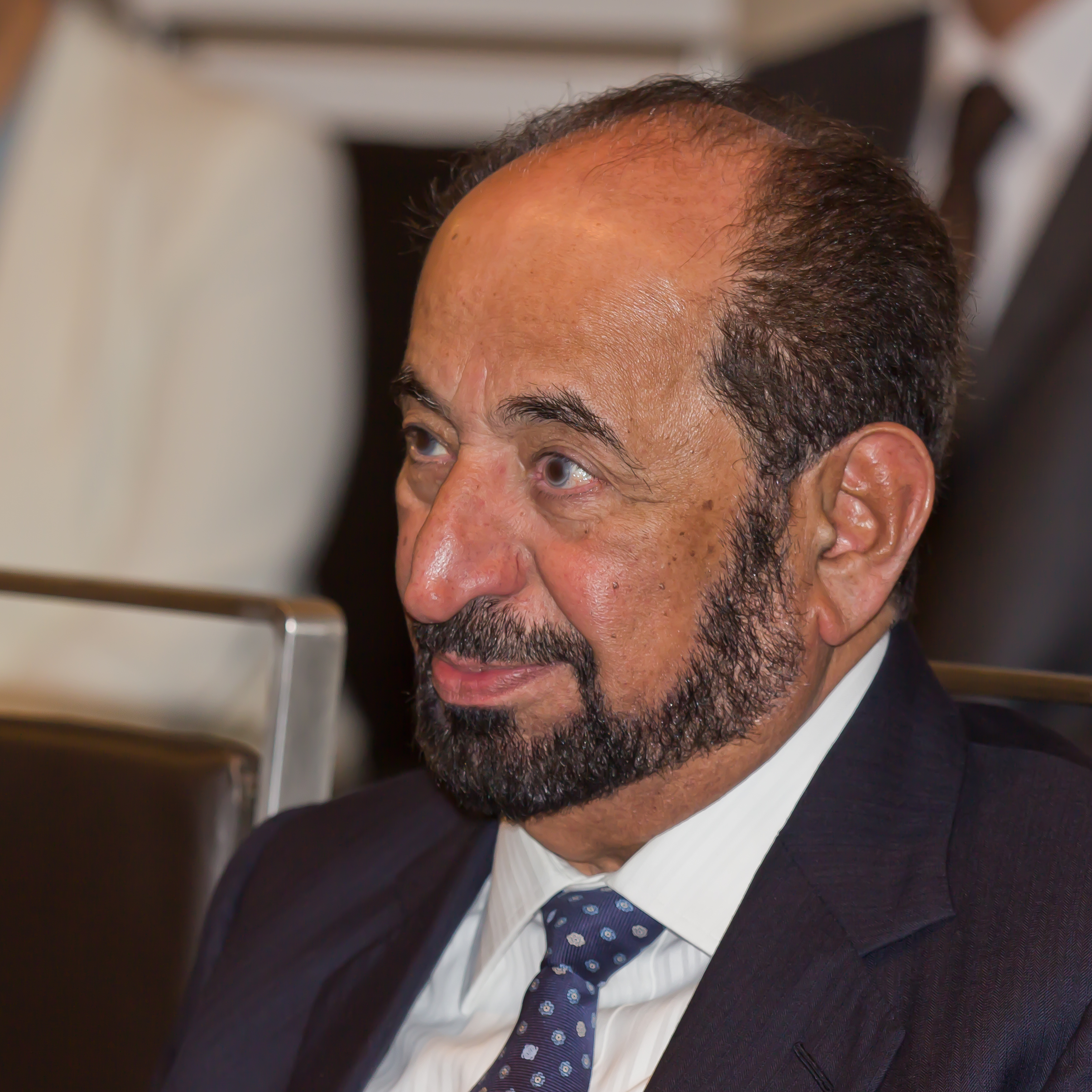
Sultan bin Muhammad Al-Qasimi

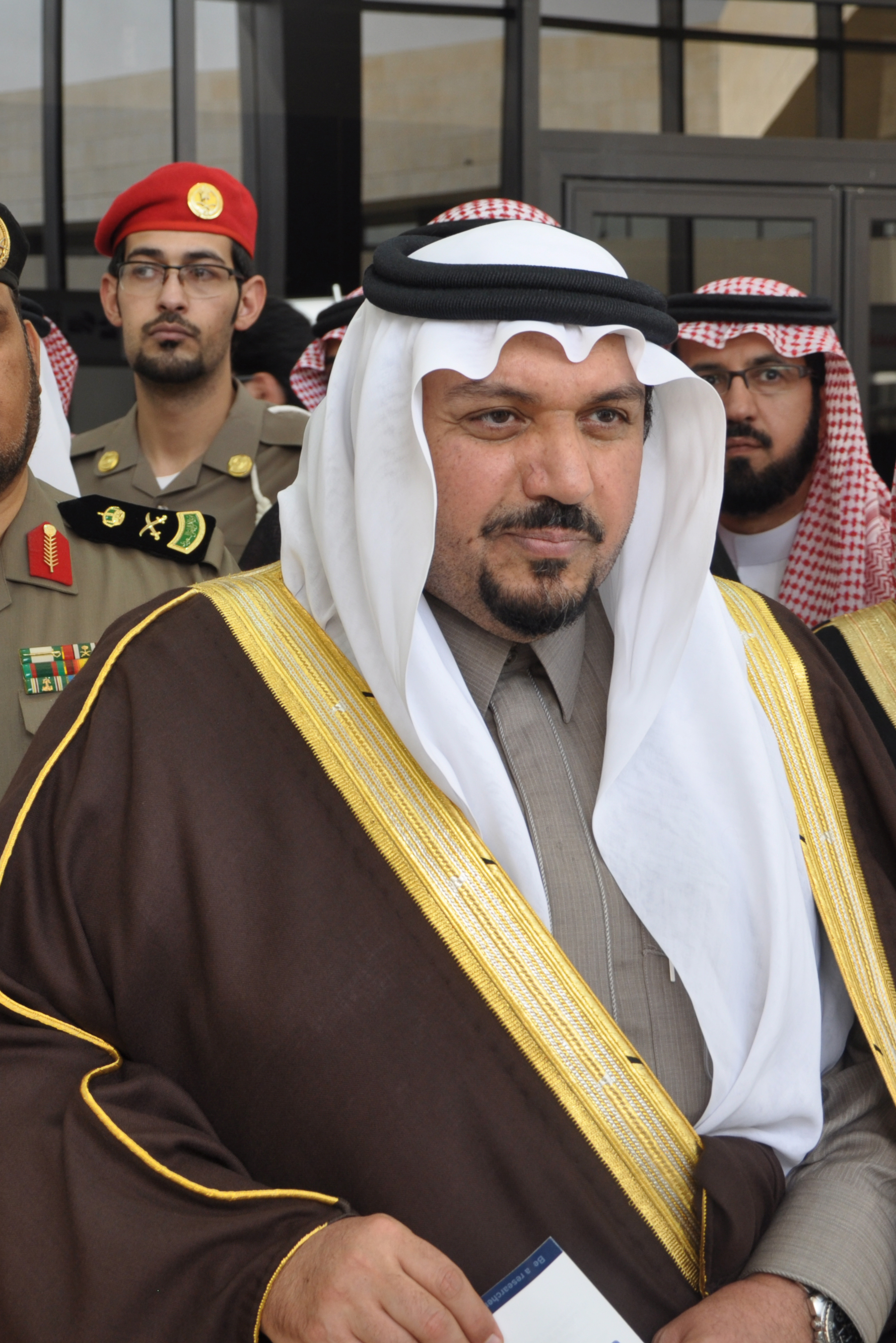
Faisal bin Mishaal Al Saud

Name	College	Notes	Ref.
Guillaume V	University	Grand Duke of Luxembourg (2025–)	
Emmanuel de Merode	?	Prince of the House of Merode; Director of Virunga National Park (2008–)	
Sultan bin Muhammad Al-Qasimi	?	Emir of Sharjah (1972–)	
Faisal bin Mishaal Al Saud	?	Prince of the House of Saud; Governor of Al-Qassim Province (2015–)	

== Sports people ==
=== Olympic and Paralympic medallists ===
Name	College	Course	Medal	Ref
Fiona Crackles	Collingwood	Bsc Sport and Exercise Science	Bronze medal (field hockey) at 2020 Summer Olympics (held in 2021) in Tokyo	
Jonathan Edwards	Van Mildert	BSc Physics	Gold medal (triple jump) at 2000 Olympics in Sydney; Silver medal in triple jump at 1996 Olympics in Atlanta	
Angus Groom	Hatfield	BSc Natural Sciences	Silver medal (Quad sculls) at 2020 Summer Olympics (held in 2021) in Tokyo	
Sophie Hosking	Trevelyan	BSc Chemistry and Physics	Gold medal (lightweight double sculls) at 2012 Olympics in London	
Stephen Rowbotham	Collingwood	BA Business Economics	Bronze medal (double sculls) at 2008 Olympics in Beijing	
Lily van den Broecke	University	BA Politics, Philosophy and Economics	Gold medal (mixed coxed four) at the 2012 Summer Paralympics	

=== Basketball players ===
- Mike Allison – basketball player for Gifu Swoops
- Monika Bosilj – Croatian basketball player
- Mollie Campbell – basketball player for Great Britain

=== Cricketers ===
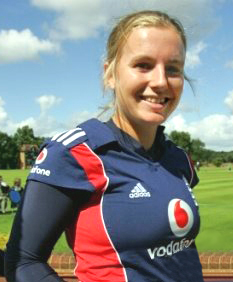
Holly Colvin

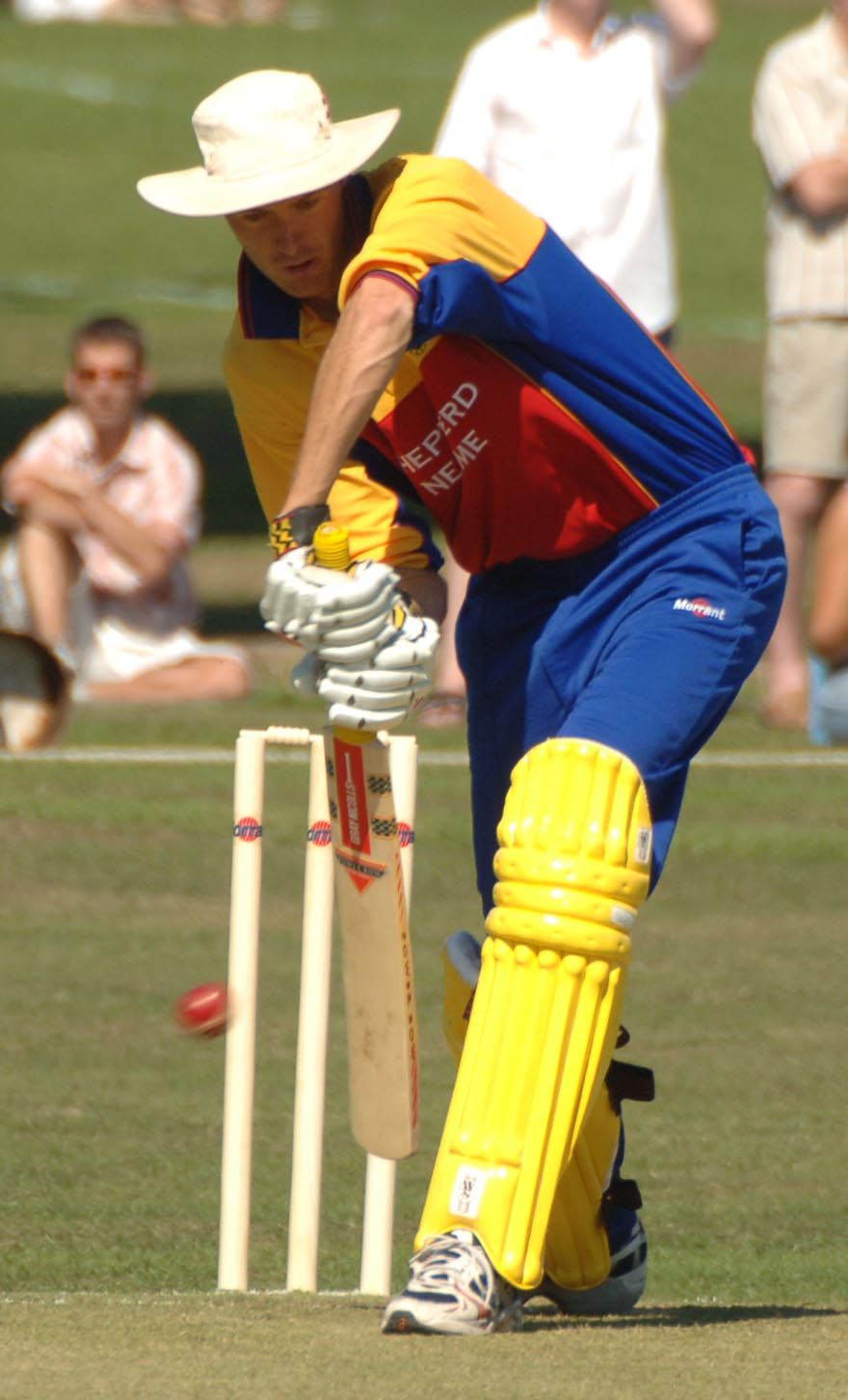
Will Jefferson

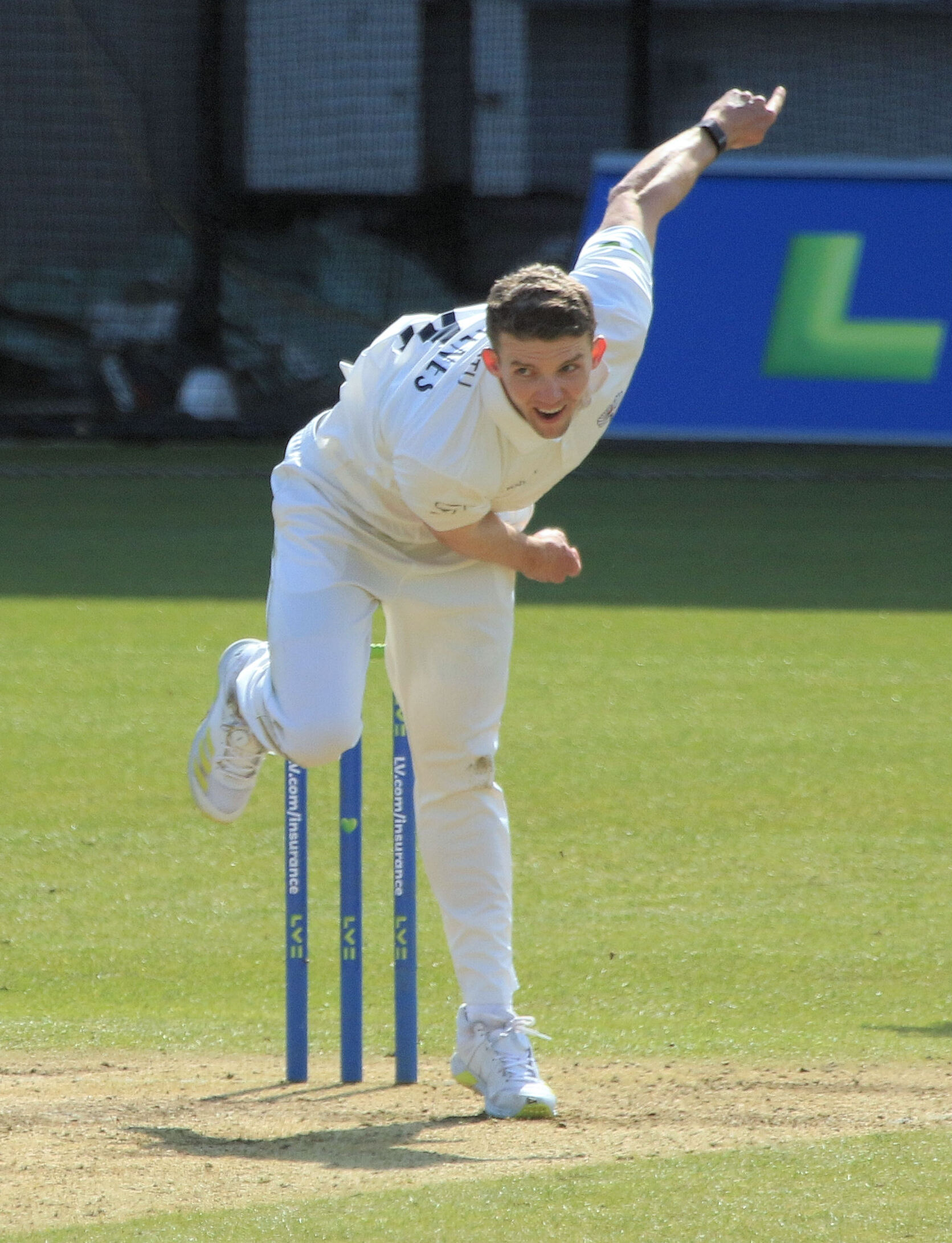
Matt Milnes

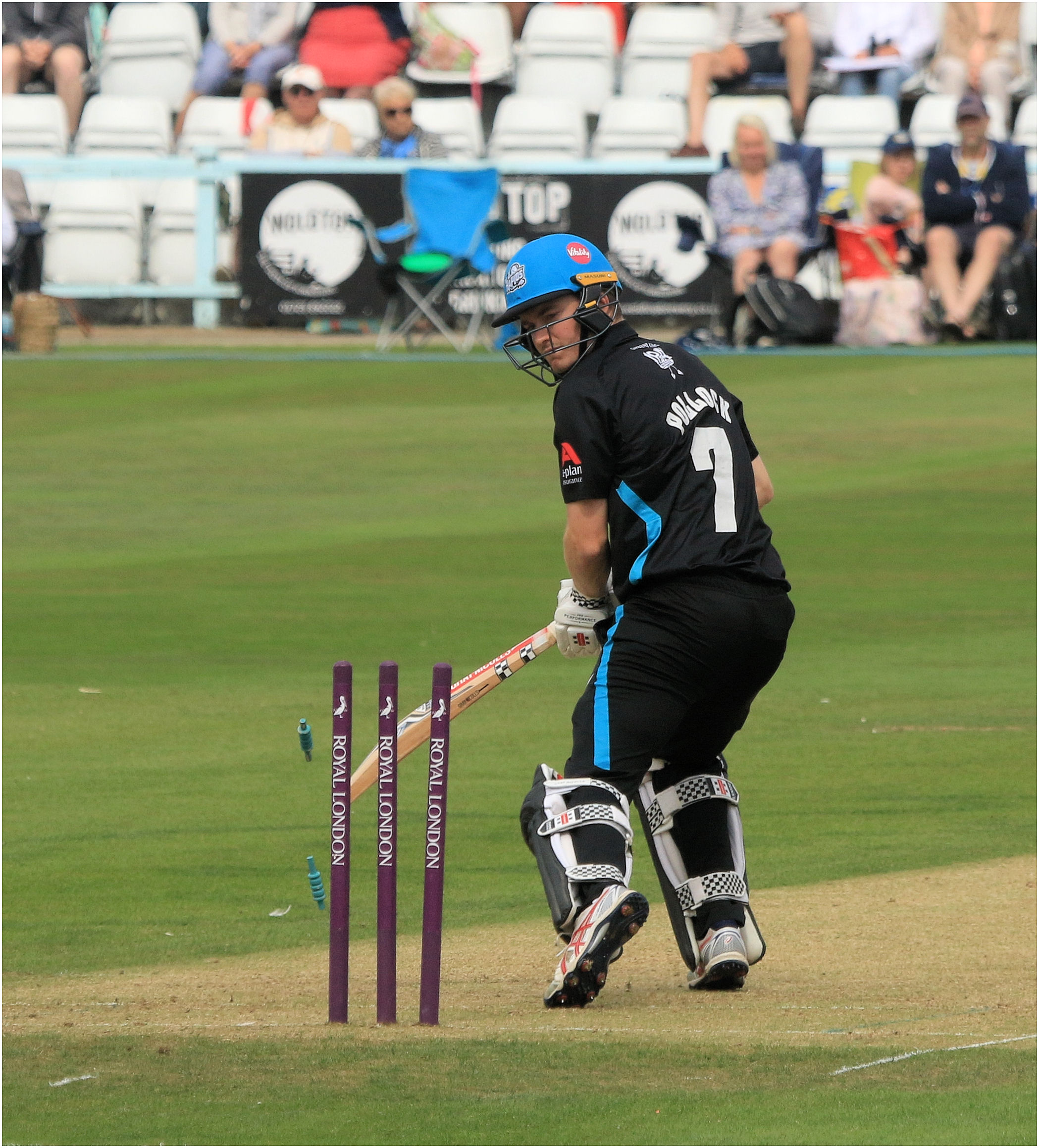
Ed Pollock

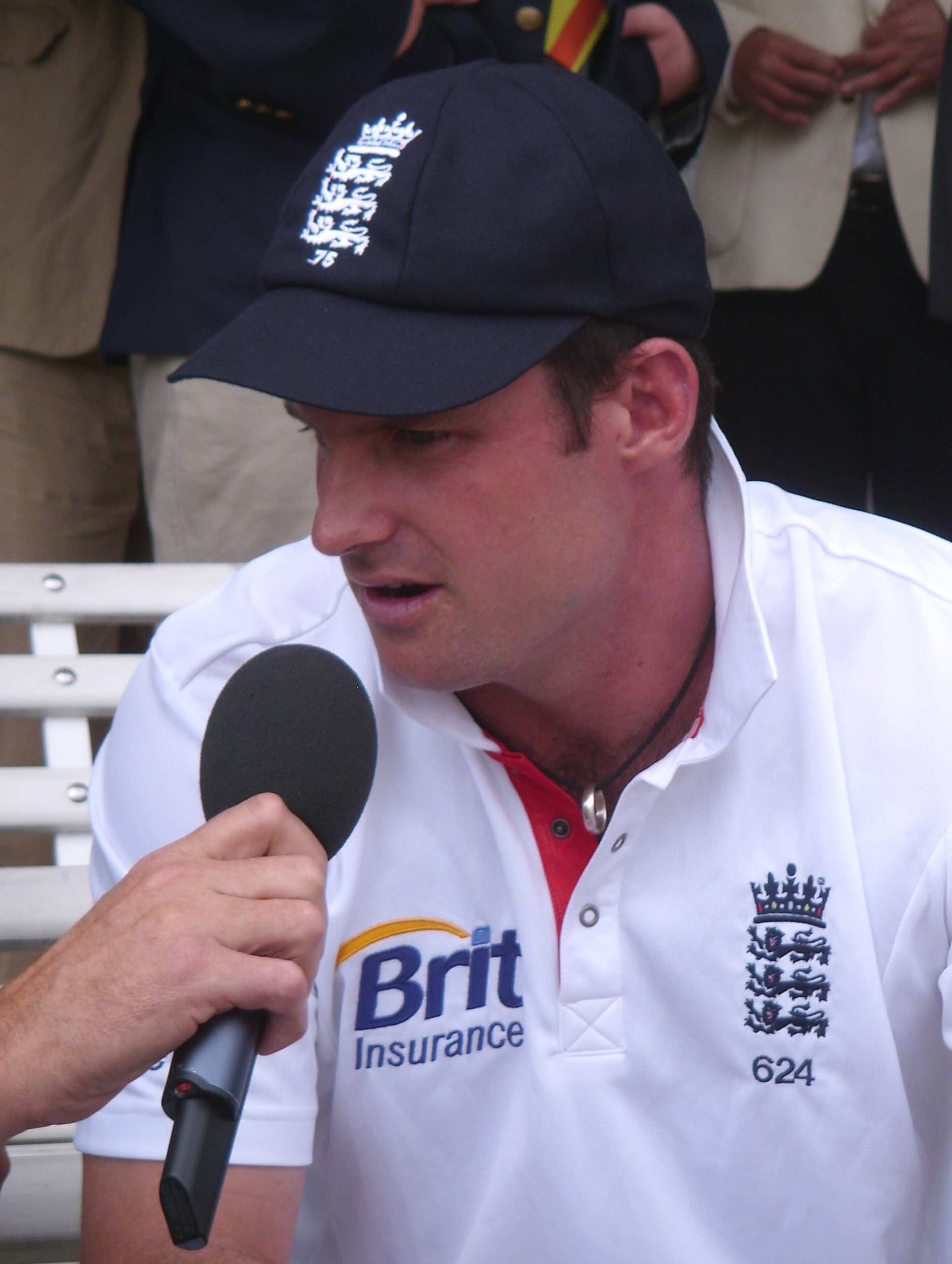
Andrew Strauss

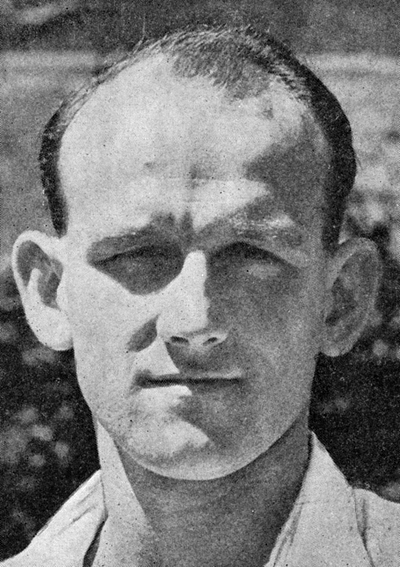
Frank 'Typhoon' Tyson

- Ajaz Akhtar – Cambridgeshire cricketer
- Paul Allott (Bede) – Lancashire and England cricketer
- Caroline Atkins (Hild Bede) – England cricketer
- Colin Atkinson (King's) – former Somerset cricket captain
- Jamie Atkinson (St Mary's) – Hong Kong cricket captain
- Steve Atkinson (Bede) – Durham, the Netherlands and Hong Kong cricketer (1970s)
- David Balcombe (Hild Bede) – Hampshire cricketer
- Jonathan Batty (St Chad's) — Surrey and Gloucestershire wicket-keeper and opening batsman
- Chaitanya Bishnoi (Hatfield) – Indian cricketer
- Mark Chilton (Grey) – former Lancashire captain
- Holly Colvin (St Mary's) – England cricketer; holds the record of being the youngest Test cricketer of either sex to play for England
- Nick Compton (Hatfield) – Middlesex and England batsman
- Matthew Creese – Middlesex (1999) and Durham UCCE (2002)
- Tim Curtis (Hatfield) – England cricketer
- Lee Daggett (John Snow) – Northamptonshire (2009–2013)
- Yasmin Daswani – Hong Kong women cricketer
- Peter Deakin (Hatfield) – Dorset (1999–2006) and Cambridge University (1996)
- Brian Evans (St Chad's) – Hertfordshire batsman
- Laurie Evans (St Mary's) – English cricketer
- Robert Ferley (Grey) – English cricketer
- James Foster (Collingwood) – Essex and England wicketkeeper
- Graeme Fowler (Bede) – former England and Lancashire cricketer; current coach of the MCC Centre of Excellence
- James Freeling, 7th Baronet (University) – represented MCC and Oxford University
- Cordelia Griffith – Middlesex Women batter
- Steve Henderson (Hatfield) – Worcestershire (1977–1981), Cambridge University (1982–1983) and Glamorgan (1983–1985) all-rounder
- Simon Hughes (University) – writer, cricket analyst and former Middlesex and Durham bowler
- Nasser Hussain (Hild Bede) – former captain of the England cricket team
- Ben Hutton – Middlesex batsman
- Thomas Jameson (Hatfield) – Warwickshire (1970) and Cambridge University (1970)
- Will Jefferson (Hild Bede) – former Essex country cricketer
- Douglas Lockhart – Scotland wicket-keeper
- Alex Loudon (Collingwood) – Warwickshire and England all-rounder
- Shan Masood - Pakistan Test cricketer
- Gehan Mendis (Bede) – Sussex and Lancashire cricketer
- Oliver Metcalfe – Munster Reds and Ireland A wicket-keeper
- Matt Milnes (Stephenson) – Kent seam bowler
- Gavin Moffat (Hatfield) – Cambridge University seam bowler
- Tim O'Gorman (St Chad's) – Derbyshire batsman (1987–1996)
- Ed Pollock (Collingwood) – Warwickshire batsman (2016–2021)
- Mia Rogers (Collingwood) – wicket-keeper for Berkshire Women and Sunrisers
- James Rowe (Hatfield) – Durham UCCE and Kent Cricket Board batsman (2002)
- Will Smith (Collingwood) – Durham batsman (2007–2013)
- Martin Speight (St Chad's) – former Durham County Cricket Club wicketkeeper
- Alexander Stead – Durham UCCE and Staffordshire cricketer
- Andrew Strauss (Hatfield) – former captain of the England Test cricket team
- Frank 'Typhoon' Tyson (Hatfield) – England fast bowler and Wisden Cricketer of the Year (1956)
- Freddie van den Bergh (Hatfield) – Surrey spin bowler
- Nathaniel Watkins (Hatfield) – Durham MCCU and Jersey cricketer
- Thomas Westley (St Cuthbert's) - England and Essex Cricketer, and Essex captain
- James Wilkes-Green (Hatfield) – Durham MCCU and Guernsey cricketer
- Robbie Williams (St Mary's) – Durham MCCU and Leicestershire fast bowler
- Matthew Windows (Hild Bede) – Gloucestershire cricketer

=== Footballers ===
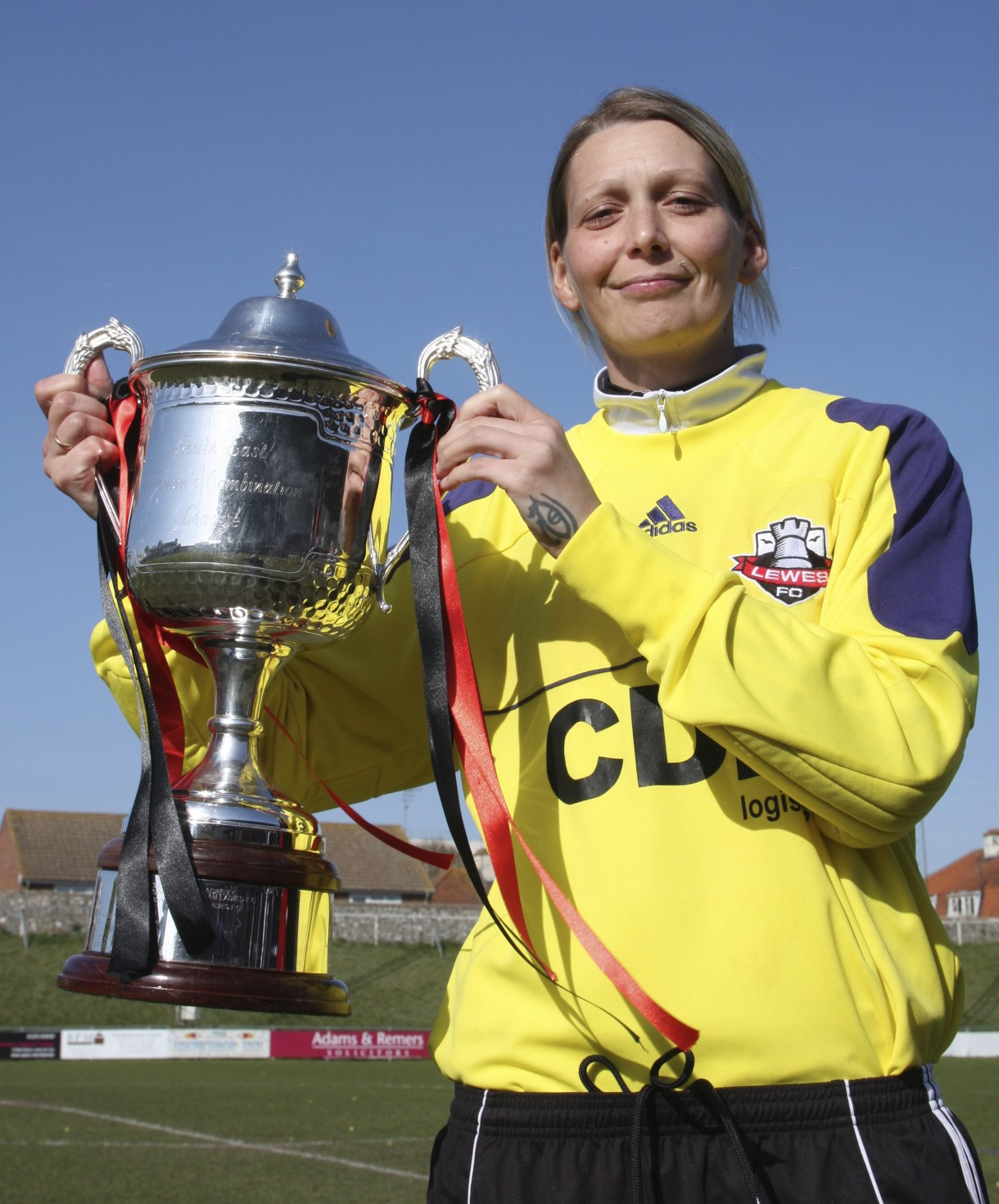
Layla Young

- Thomas Blyth (Armstrong) – centre forward for Newcastle United
- Eddy Brown – Coventry City and Birmingham City centre forward
- Warren Bradley (Hatfield) – Manchester United and England footballer
- Ana Cate – midfielder for Nicaragua women's team
- Oliver Gill (St Cuthbert's) – footballer for Manchester United Football Club
- Tommy Jackson – Aston Villa goalkeeper
- Michael King (St Aidan's) – former Burnley winger
- Rory Lonergan – Hong Kong FC left-back
- Matt Perrella – goalkeeper for Utica City FC
- Joe Shaw (Armstrong) – Hull City forward
- Molly-Mae Sharpe – Crystal Palace Women winger
- Jim Shoulder (St Cuthbert's) – Scarborough F.C. footballer
- Wouter Verstraaten (Grey) – South Shields defender
- Layla Young – footballer, Brighton & Hove Albion, Doncaster Belles and England

=== Field Hockey players ===
- Jamie Cachia (St Mary's) – goalkeeper for Scotland national team
- Fiona Crackles (Collingwood) – represented Great Britain at the 2020 Summer Olympics
- Steph Elliott (Collingwood) – defender for England women's team
- Tessa Howard (University) – midfielder for England women's team
- Ollie Payne (Josephine Butler) – represented Great Britain at the 2020 Summer Olympics
- Sean Rowlands – represented Great Britain at the 1992 Summer Olympics in Barcelona
- Rui Saldanha (Hatfield) – represented Great Britain at the 1972 Summer Olympics
- Rhys Smith (St Mary's) – midfielder for England national team
- Jack Turner – forward for England national team
- Jack Waller (Hild Bede) – defender for England and Great Britain

=== Rowers ===
- Simon Barr (Hatfield)
- Colin Barratt
- Roger Brown (Hild Bede)
- Andy Butt
- James Clarke (St Cuthbert's)
- Philippa Cross
- Suzie Ellis (Trevelyan)
- Angus Groom (Hatfield)
- Will Fletcher (Hild Bede)
- Alice Freeman (Hatfield)
- Lucinda Gooderham (Hild Bede)
- Wade Hall-Craggs (Grey)
- Naomi Hoogesteger (Hild Bede)
- David Hosking (Grey)
- Tracy Langlands (St Mary's)
- Ian Lawson (St Cuthbert's)
- Lindsey Maguire (Ustinov)
- Callum McBrierty (St John's)
- Malindi Myers
- Louisa Reeve (Hatfield)
- Matt Rossiter (St Cuthbert's)
- Peter Rudge (Van Mildert)
- Emily Taylor (Hatfield)
- Kim Thomas
- Lily van den Broecke (University)

=== Rugby players ===
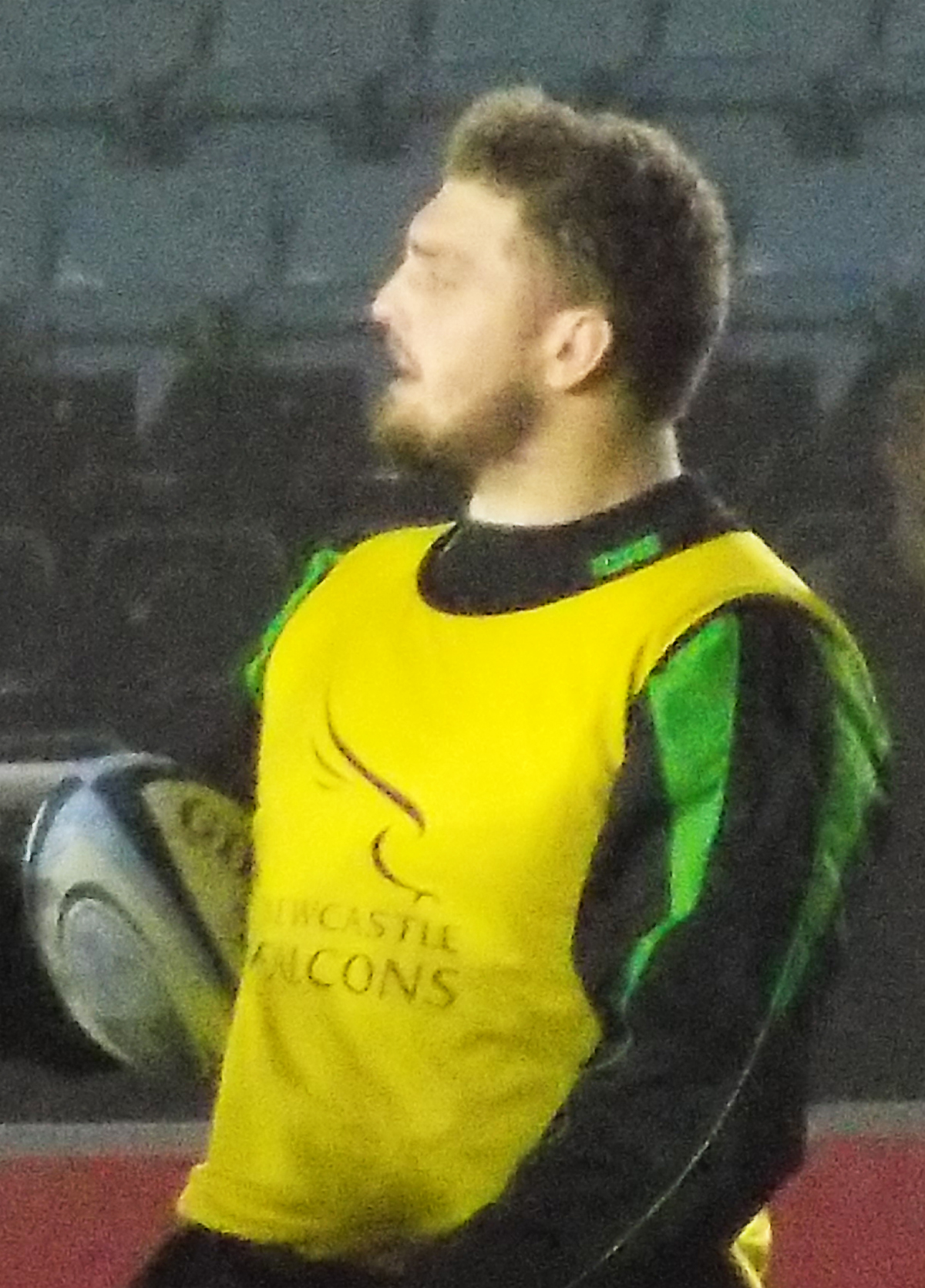
Adam Brocklebank

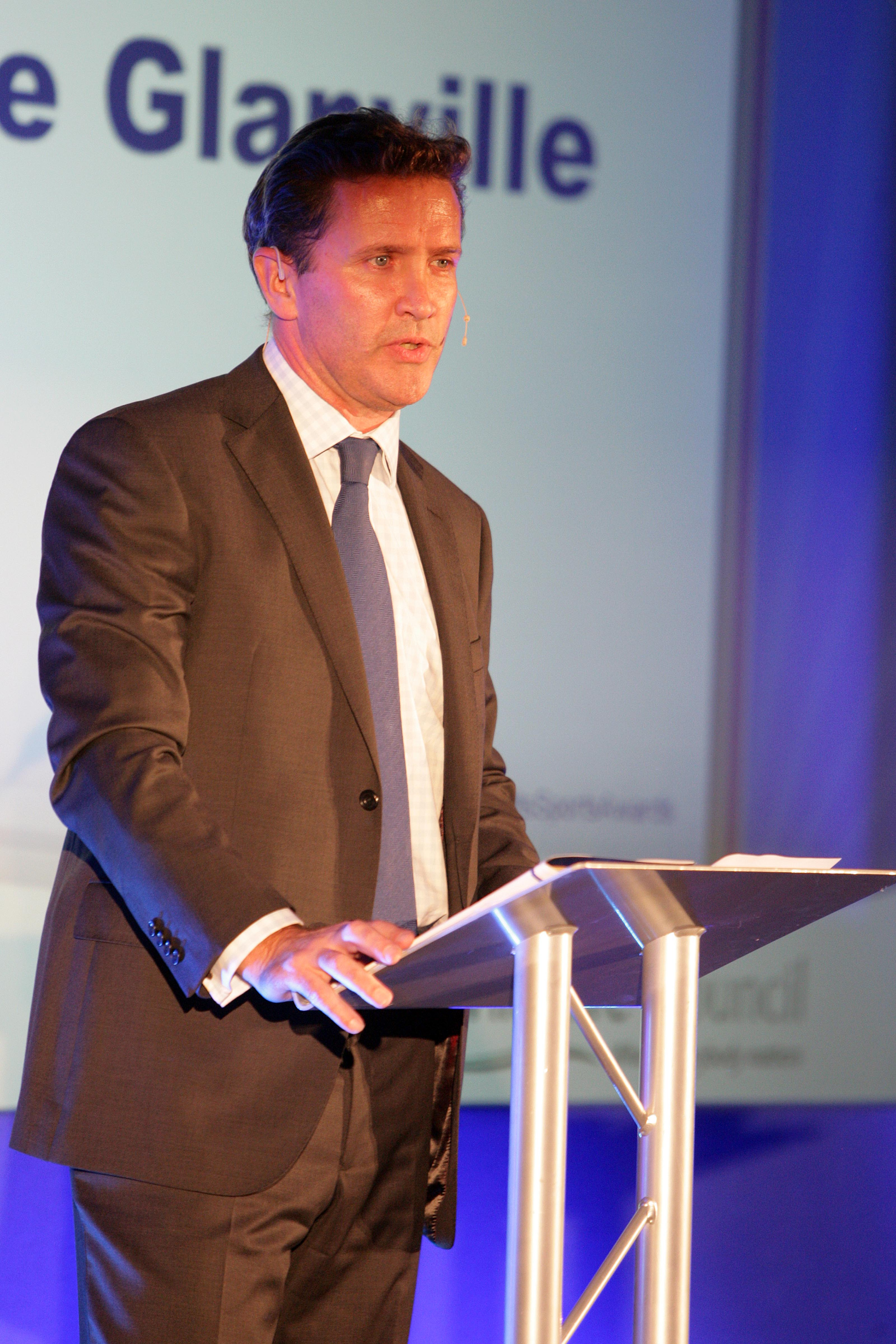
Phil de Glanville

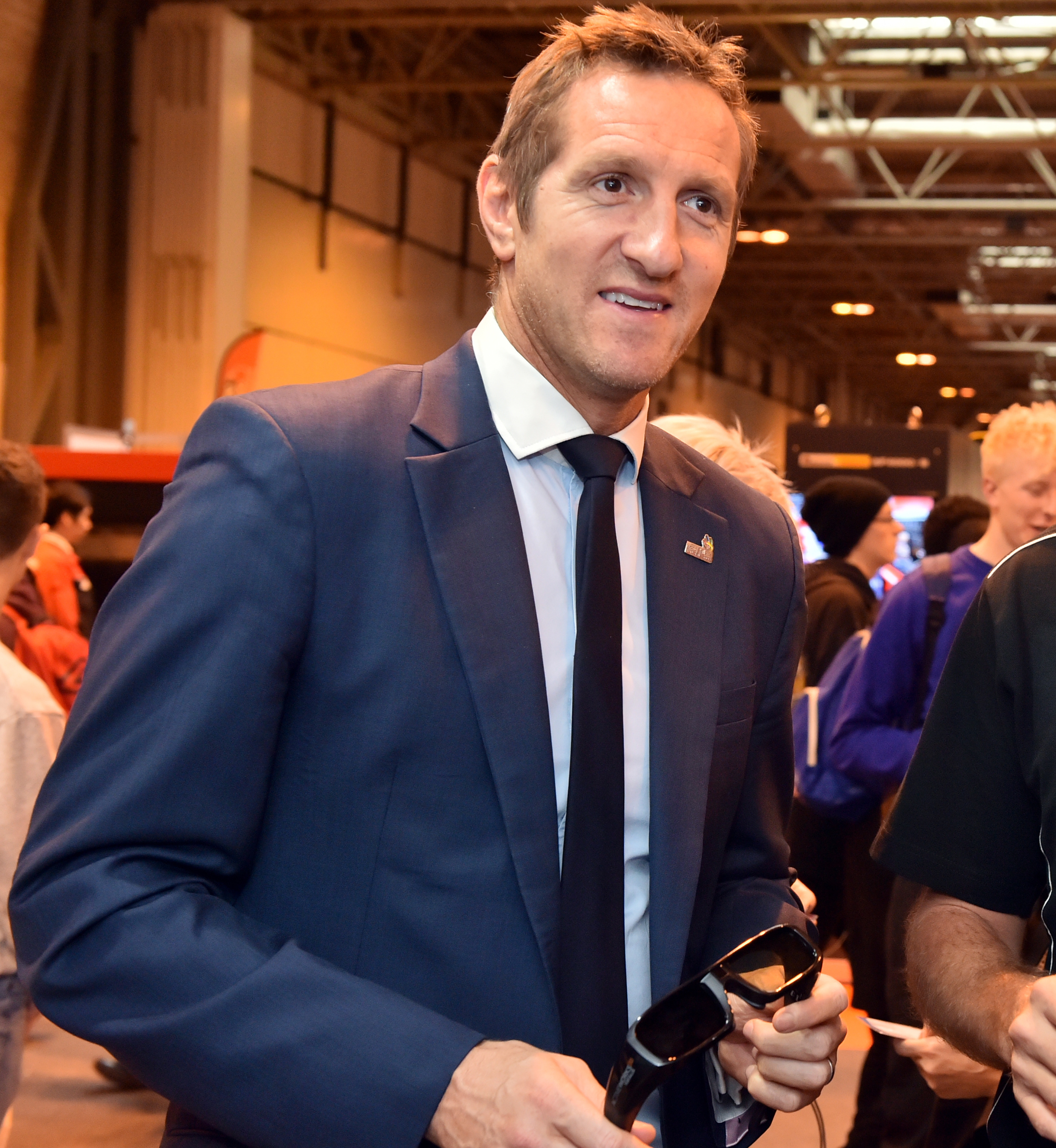
Will Greenwood

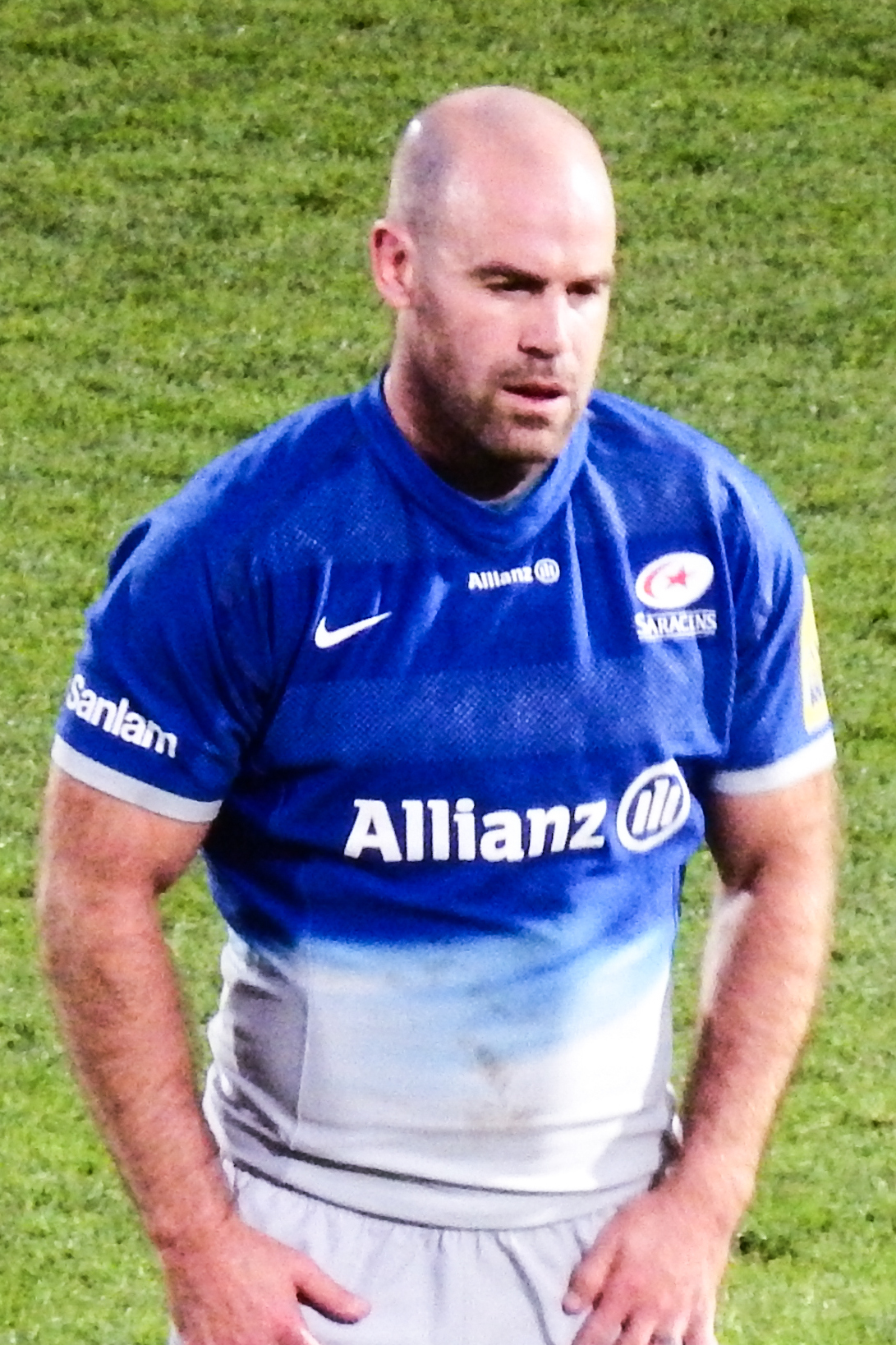
Charlie Hodgson

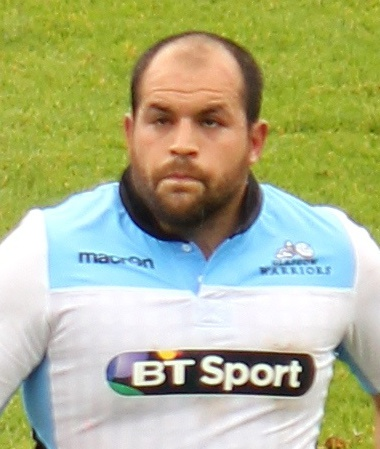
Ed Kalman

- Fenwick Allison (Kings College) – England international rugby player
- Toby Allchurch (Hatfield) – participated in 1979 England rugby union tour of Japan, Fiji and Tonga
- Josh Beaumont (St. Aidan's) – Sale Sharks and England national rugby union team player
- Mark Bailey (Hild Bede) – former English national rugby union player, Professor of Later Medieval History at the University of East Anglia
- David Barnes – Bath prop
- Beth Blacklock (Stephenson and Hatfield) – centre, Harlequins Women and Scotland women's national team
- Richard Breakey (Hatfield) – Scotland rugby player
- Adam Brocklebank (Collingwood) – Newcastle Falcons prop
- Peter Browne (St John's) – Ulster Rugby lock/flanker
- Jeremy Campbell-Lamerton (Hatfield) – former Scottish rugby union lock
- Will Carling (Hatfield) – rugby union player for Harlequin F.C., former captain of the England national rugby union team (1988–1996)
- Fran Clough (Collingwood) – England rugby player
- Jon Dunbar – Scotland flanker
- Phil de Glanville (University) – former captain of the England national rugby union team
- P.J. Dixon (Grey) – Captain of England Rugby Union Team 1972; as an uncapped player, played in the Lions' first Test victories against New Zealand in 1971
- Maurice Fitzgerald (Hild Bede) – England A and Biarritz prop
- Coreen Grant (St John's) – centre, Saracens Women and Scotland women's national team
- Will Greenwood (Hatfield) – England rugby player
- Simon Hammersley – Sale Sharks fullback
- Charlie Hannaford (Hatfield) – England rugby player
- Fitz Harding (Hatfield) – Bristol Bears back row
- Duncan Hodge – Scotland full back
- Charlie Hodgson – England rugby player
- Ed Kalman (Hild Bede) – Scotland prop
- Heather Kerr (St Mary's) – represented England at 2017 Women's Rugby World Cup
- Peter Lillington (Hatfield) – participated in 1981 Scotland rugby union tour of New Zealand
- Stuart Legg (Hatfield) – former rugby union full-back for Newcastle Falcons and Treviso
- Claudia MacDonald (Josephine Butler) – England women scrum-half
- Nick Makin (University) – Newcastle Falcons hooker
- Alan Old – England international and British and Irish Lion, participated in 1974 South Africa tour
- Chris Oti - England international
- Guy Pepper (Grey) – Bath flanker
- Max Pepper (Collingwood) – Newcastle Falcons scrum-half
- Ollie Phillips (Van Mildert) – captained England sevens
- Sean Robinson – second row for Newcastle Falcons
- Marcus Rose (Hatfield) – England rugby union international full back
- Peter Rossborough (Bede) – former England rugby fullback
- Andy Mullins (Hatfield) – England rugby player
- Ben Stevenson – wing for Newcastle Falcons
- Tim Stimpson (Grey) – rugby union player and England international (1996–2002)
- Rob Vickers (Van Mildert) – Newcastle Falcons hooker
- Dave Walder (Hatfield) – rugby union footballer, fly-half for the Mitsubishi Sagamihara DynaBoars in Japan
- Peter Warfield (Hatfield) – England rugby player
- Ben Woods (Hatfield) – former rugby union player who played for Newcastle Falcons and Leicester Tigers as an openside flanker

=== Runners ===
- Mark Hudspith (Hatfield) – long-distance runner, 1994 Commonwealth Games medallist
- Colin Kirkham (St Cuthbert's) – marathon runner, competed at 1972 Summer Olympics
- Rahul Mehta (S. Mary's) – Indian long-distance runner, most famous for his victory in the 2001 Great North Run
- Jon Solly (Hatfield) – long-distance runner, 1986 Commonwealth Games champion

=== Tennis players ===
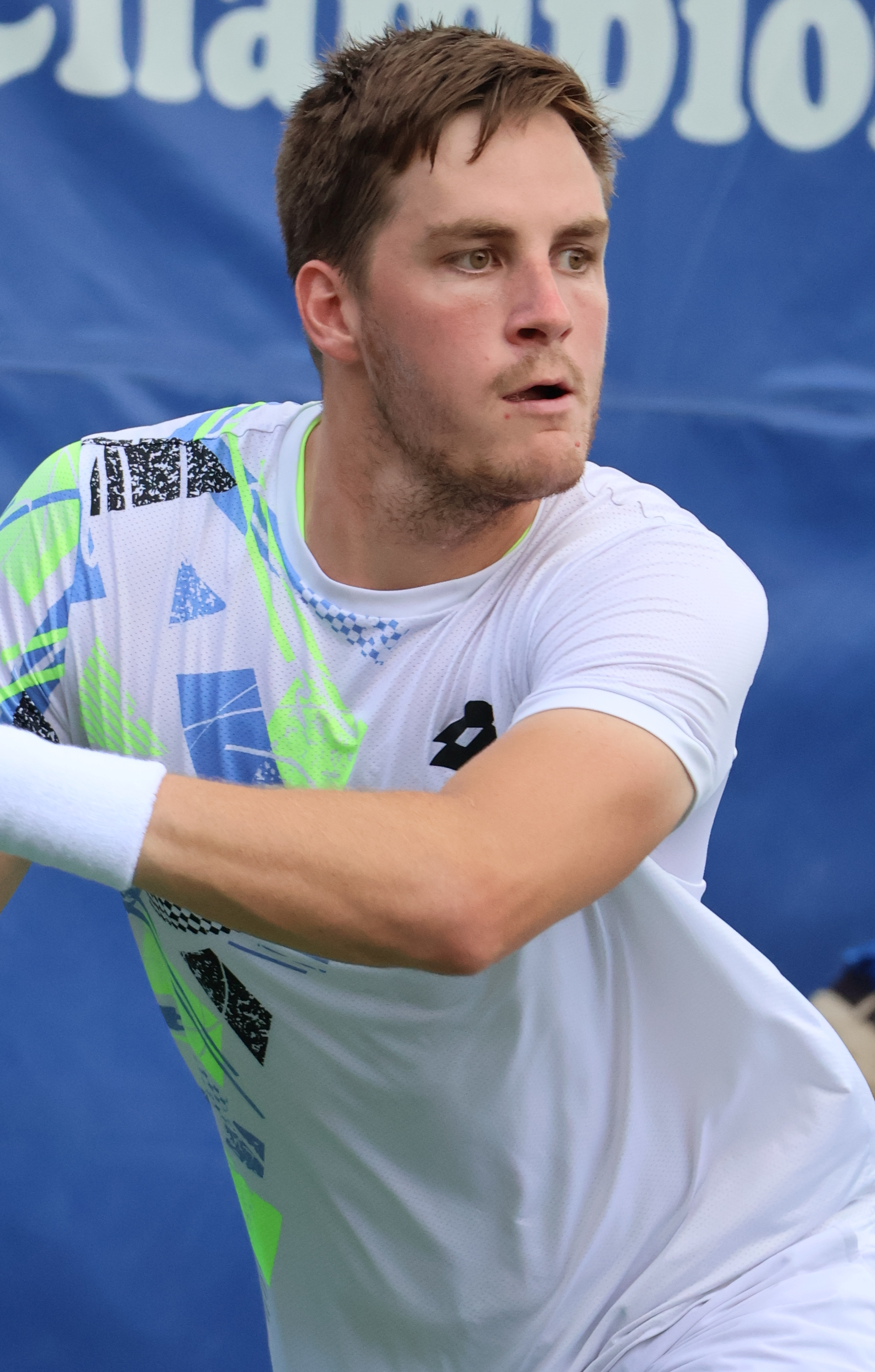
Henry Patten

- Mallory Cecil (St Mary's)
- Gabriela Knutson (Hatfield and Ustinov)
- Henry Patten (Collingwood)
- Romana Tabak
- Finn Tearney
- Julius Tverijonas
- Filip Veger

=== Other sports people ===
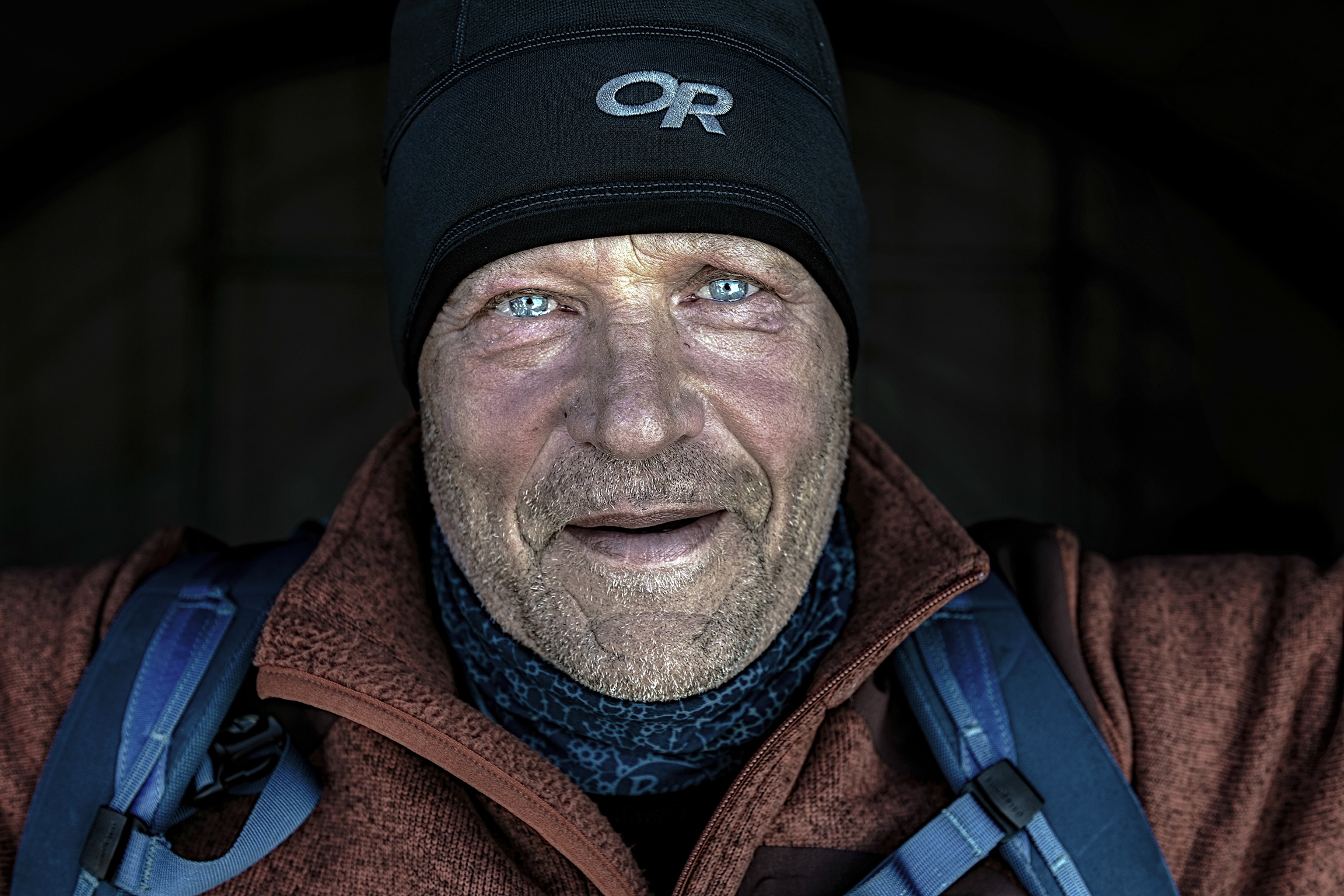
Explorer Robert Swan

- Colin Crouch – chess International Master and prolific chess author
- Peter Elleray (Collingwood) – Formula One and Le Mans Race Car designer
- Katharine Ford (Hatfield) – 4 times world-record holding Ultracyclist and the first ever Briton to ride for 12 Hours or more on an Indoor Velodrome and Static bicycle
- Shirin Gerami – first Iranian woman triathlete
- Michael Knighton (Cuths) – Chairman of Carlisle United F.C.
- Eli Schenkel (born 1992) - Canadian Olympic fencer
- Robert Swan (St Chad's) – Honorary Fellow of St Chad's, Explorer – the first person to reach both the South and North Pole on foot
- Jock Wishart (Bede) – set a new world record for circumnavigation of the globe in a powered vessel and organising the Polar Race

== Writers ==
=== Authors ===
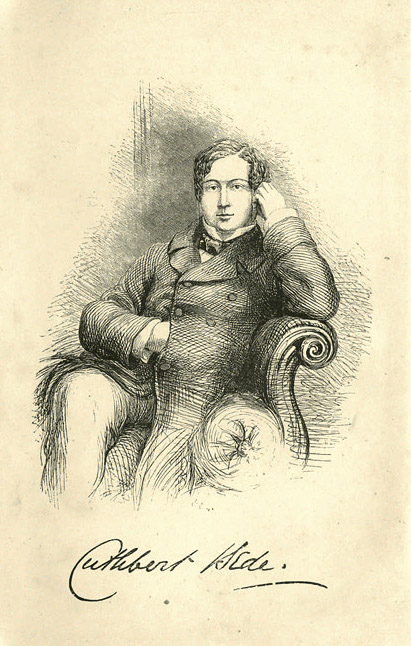
Edward Bradley

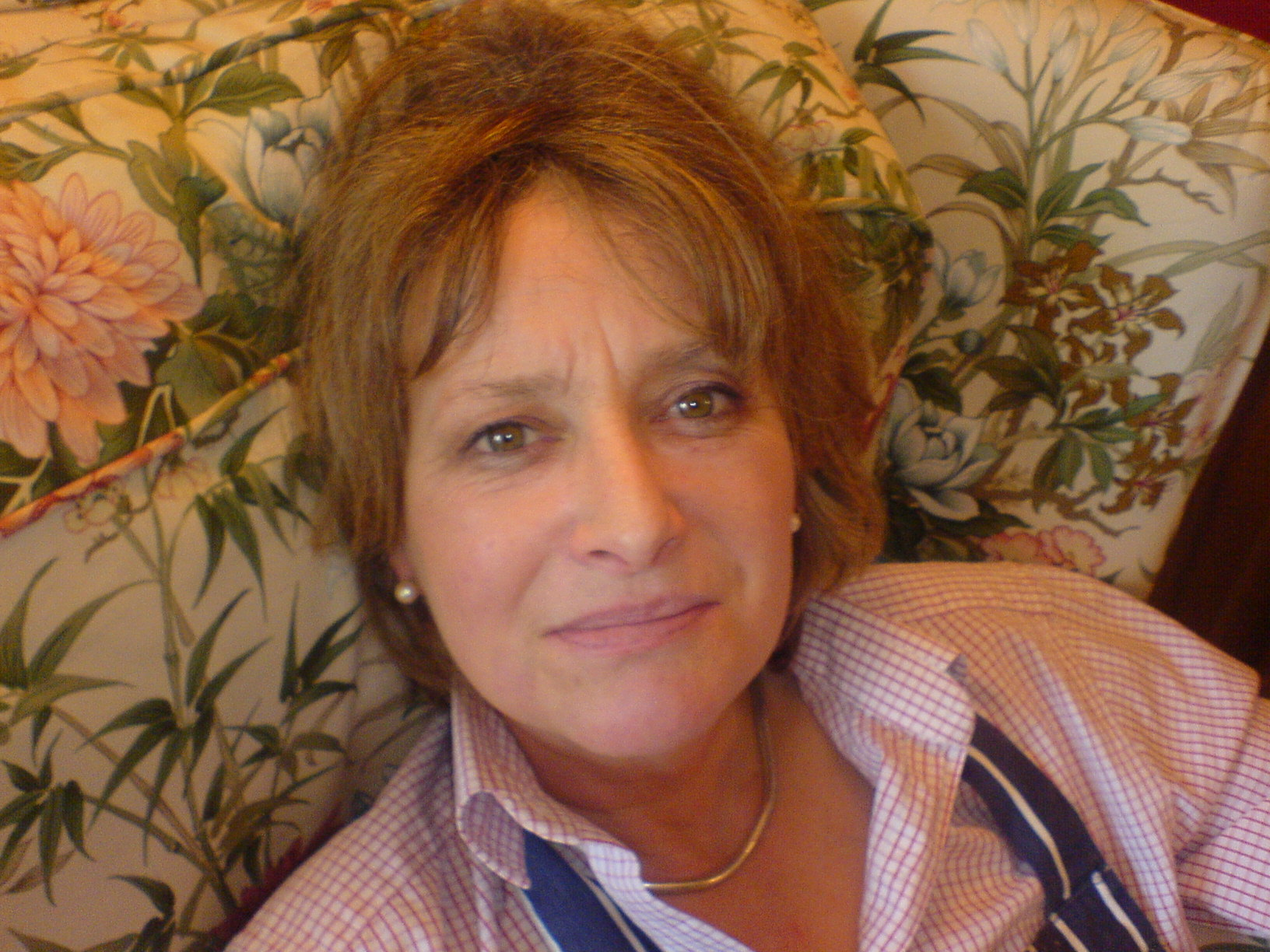
Minette Walters

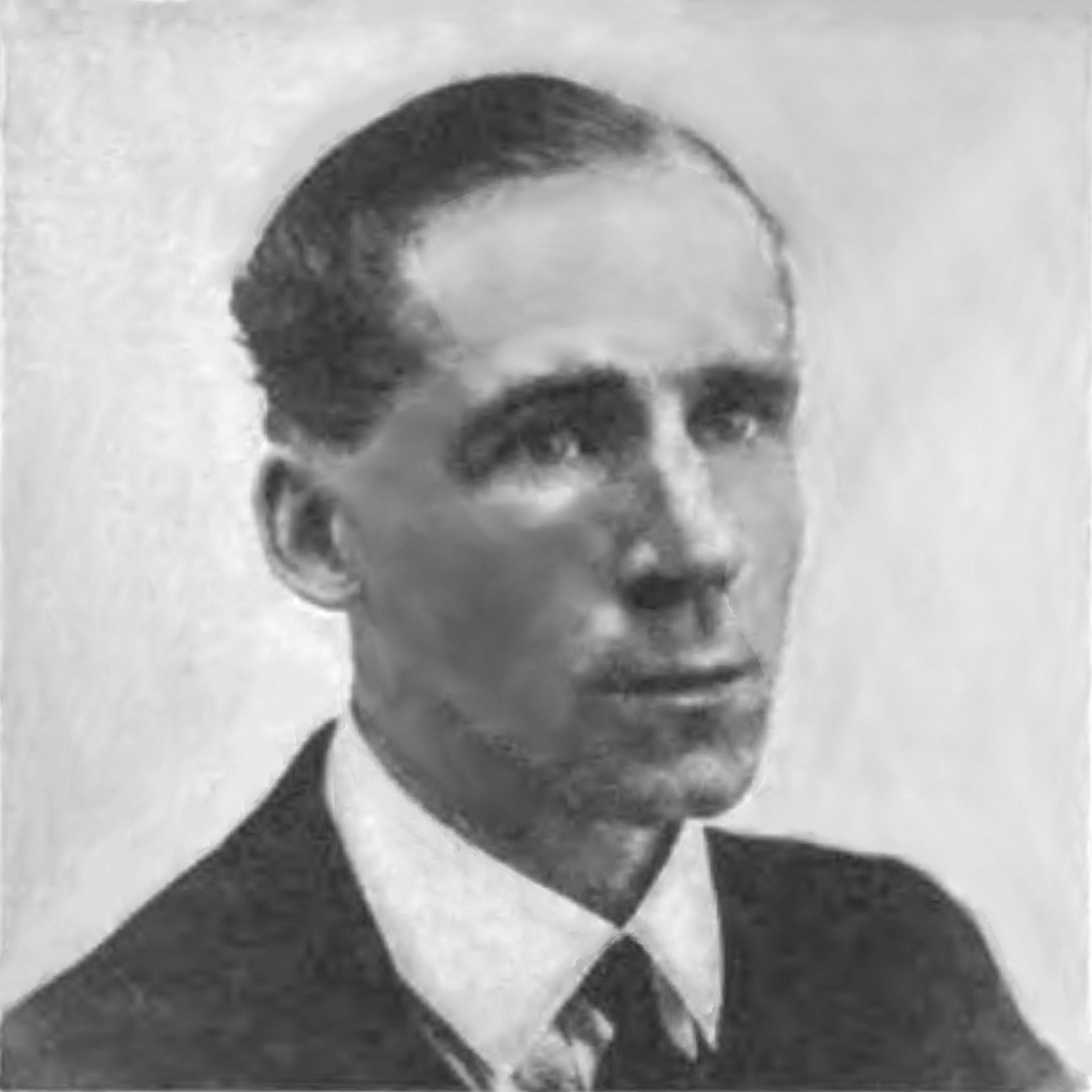
Ernest Raymond

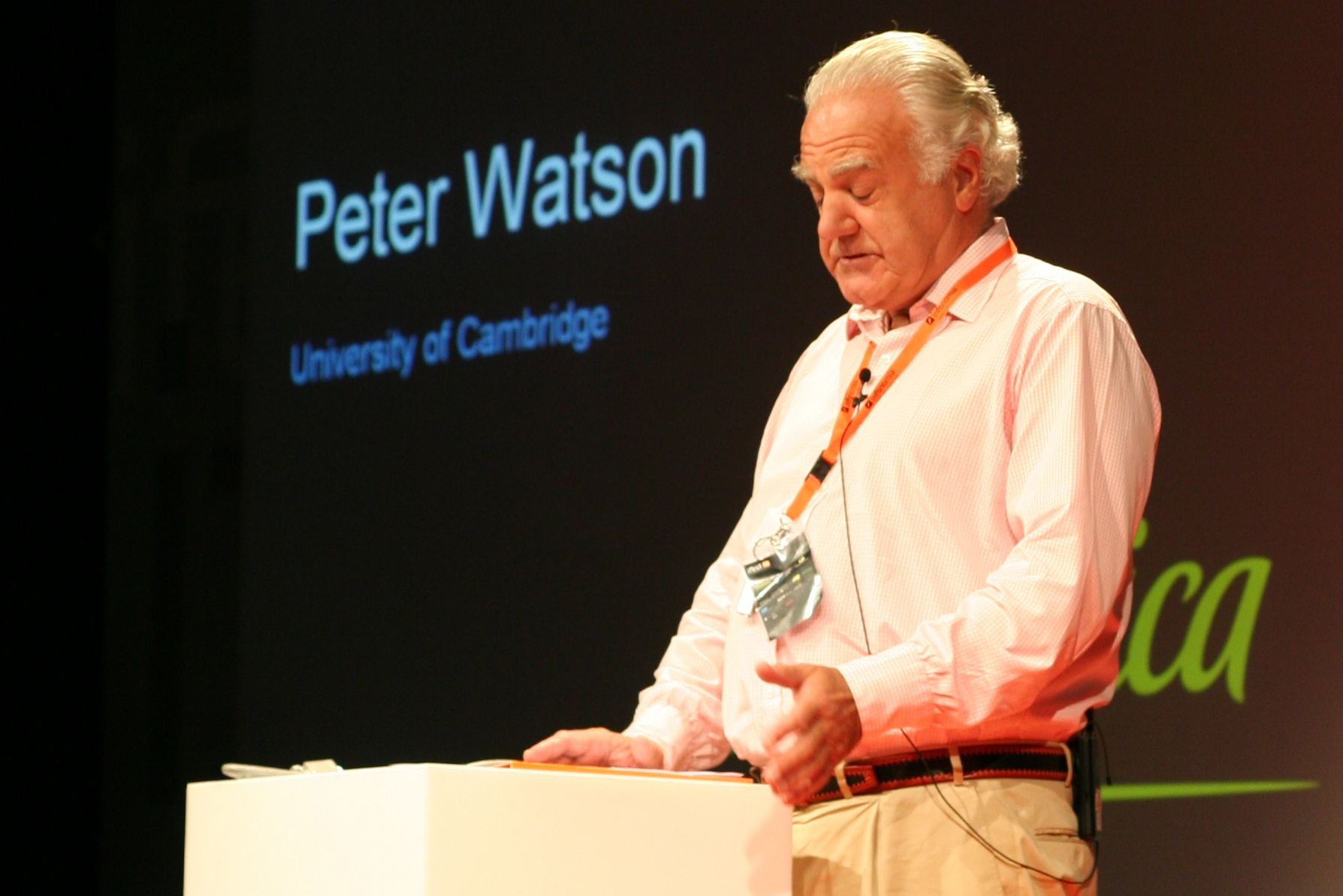
Peter Watson

- Poppy Adams (Hatfield) – novelist
- Russell Ash (St Cuthbert's) – author of Top 10 of Everything
- Oliver Balch (Hatfield) - travel writer
- Simi Bedford – Nigerian novelist
- John Blackburn (King's) – thriller writer
- Edward Bradley (University) – novelist and clergyman known by the pen name Cuthbert M. Bede; author of The Adventures of Mr. Verdant Green
- Bill Bryson – writer and former University Chancellor
- Barbara Cleverly – author of mystery novels
- William Farquhar Conton – Sierra Leonean author best known for The African
- Tim FitzHigham (St Chad's) – award-winning British comedian, author, and world record holder
- Stephen Davies (Collingwood) – children's author
- Mark Elliott (Collingwood) – travel writer
- Justin Hill (St Cuthbert's) – award-winning young author
- Lorna Hill (St Mary's) – children's writer, author of the Sadlers Wells series
- Khaled Khalifa – Banipal fellow at St Aidan's College
- Baret Magarian (University) – novelist and freelance journalist
- Allan Mallinson (St Chad's) – military historian and author of the Matthew Hervey novels
- Guy Mankowski – author
- Alice Oseman - author and illustrator, creator of the Heartstopper series
- Katharine Preston (Hatfield) – author and public speaker
- Rosa Rankin-Gee (Hatfield) - novelist
- Ernest Raymond (Unattached) – novelist
- Mary Stewart (Hild) – novelist
- Patrick Tilley – science fiction author (The Amtrak Wars)
- Dan van der Vat (St Cuthbert's) – journalist, author
- Annabel Venning (University) – journalist, author
- Minette Walters (Trevelyan) – bestselling author and crime writer
- Peter Watson (University) – journalist, author
- Charles Gidley Wheeler – screenwriter (The Sandbaggers) and novelist
- Nussaibah Younis (Ustinov) – writer and academic

=== Journalists ===
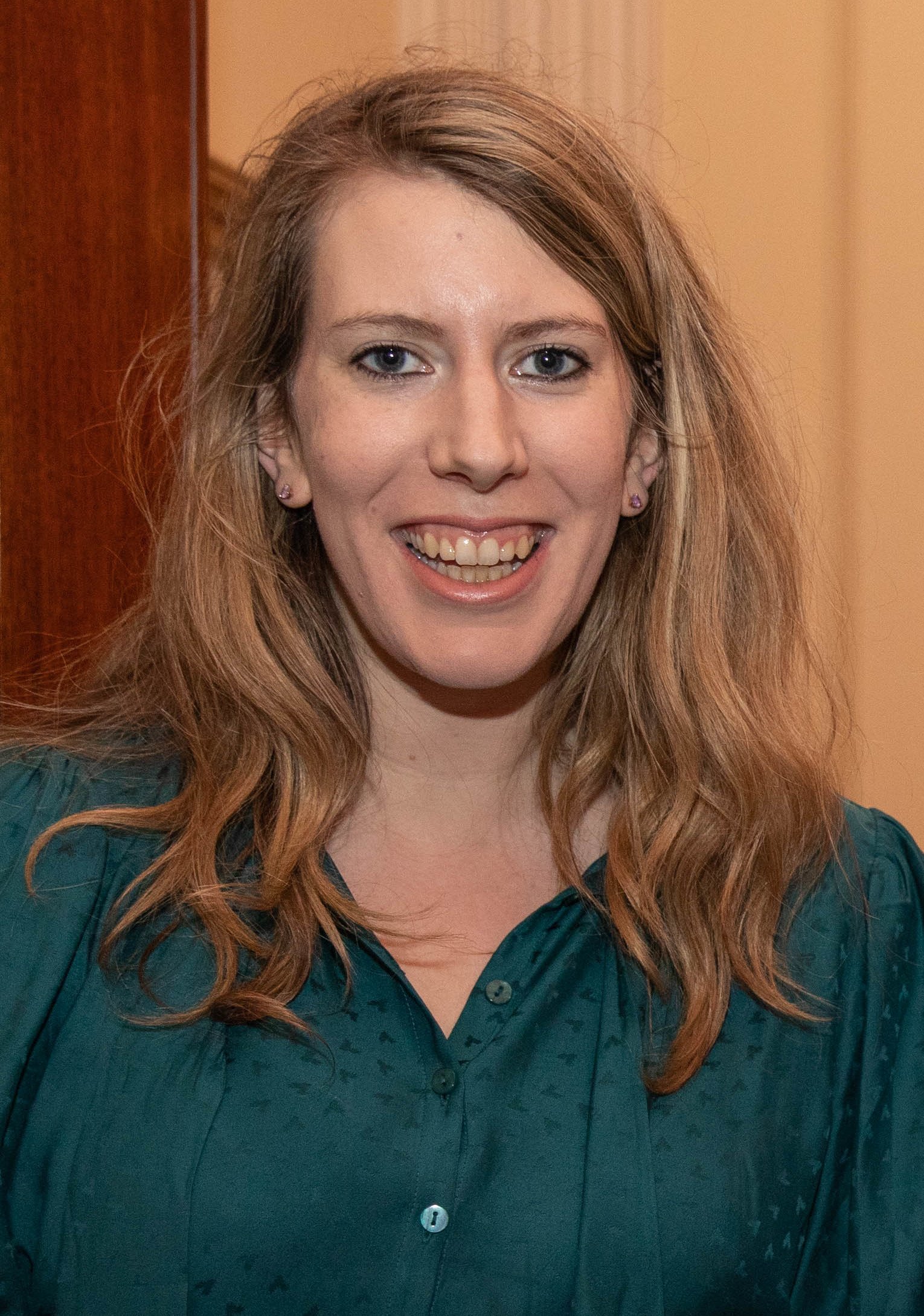
Katy Balls

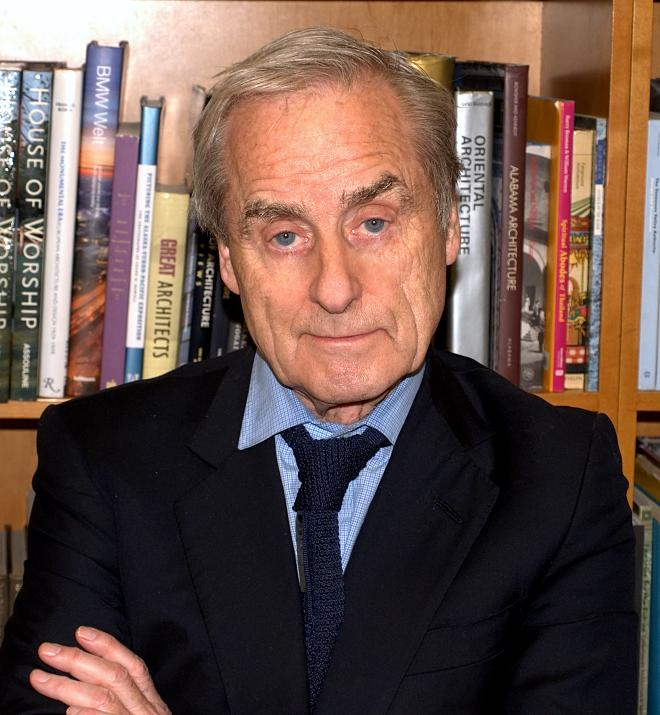
Harold Evans

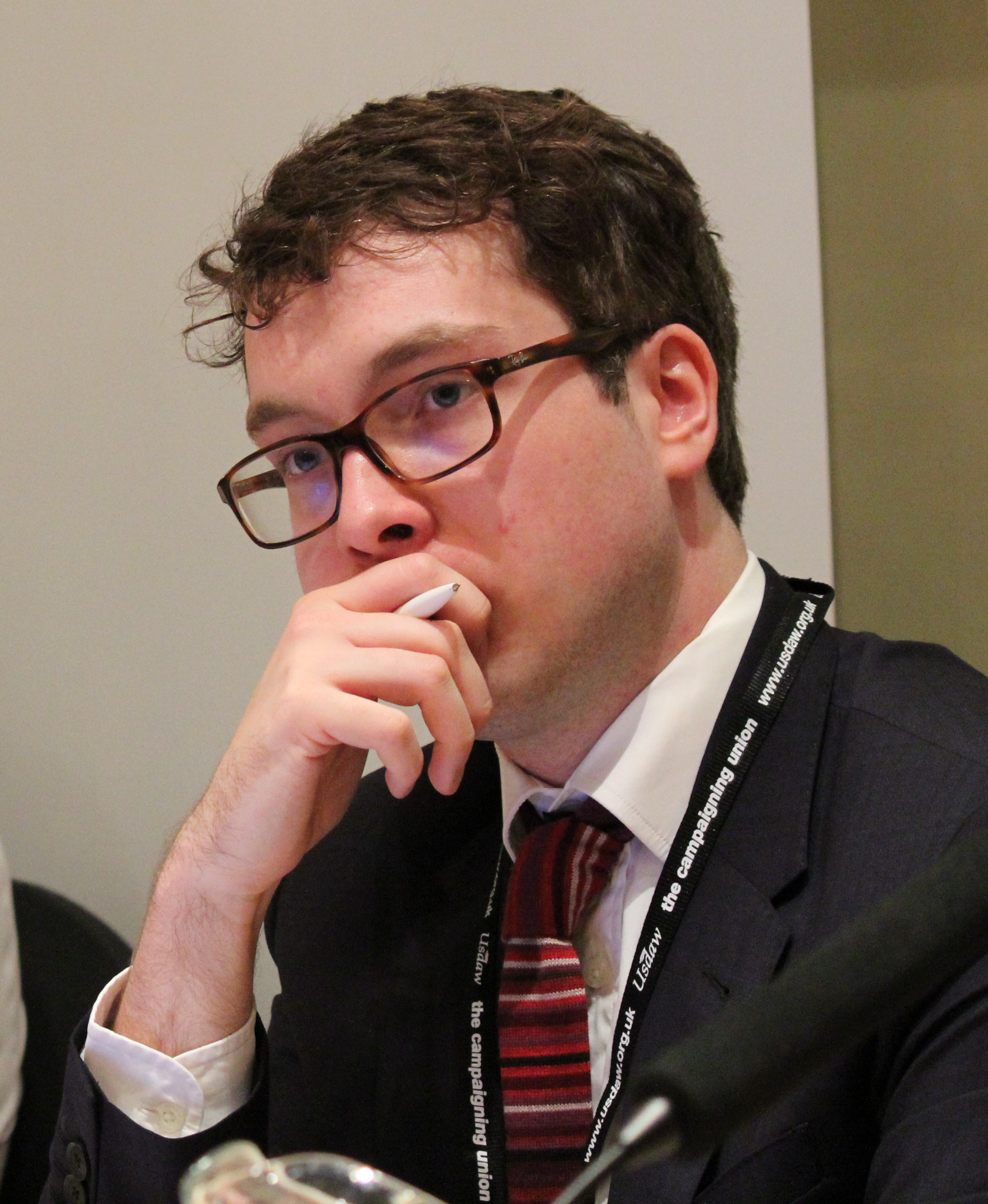
Sebastian Payne

- George Arbuthnott – investigative journalist
- Tim Atkin (University) – wine correspondent
- Katy Balls (St Aidan's) – political editor of The Spectator
- Dominic Carman (Hatfield) – journalist and Liberal Democrat politician
- Benjamin Cook (Collingwood) – journalist and author
- Adrian Dannatt (St Chad's) – child actor, artist and journalist
- Hunter Davies (University) – journalist and author of The Beatles: The Only Authorised Biography
- Harold Evans (University) – journalist; former editor of The Sunday Times and The Times; author of The American Century
- Nigel Farndale (Grad Soc) – writer in the Sunday Telegraph
- Jonah Fisher (Collingwood) – BBC journalist
- Alexander Frater (Hatfield) – travel writer, journalist
- Tom Harwood (St Mary's) - journalist, political commentator
- Annabel Heseltine (St Mary's) – editor of School House Magazine
- Graham Hancock (St Cuthbert's) – co-editor of New Internationalist magazine, 1976–1979; East Africa correspondent of The Economist, 1981–1983
- Andrew Holgate (St Cuthbert's) – Literary Editor, The Sunday Times
- John Kay (Hatfield) – former chief reporter with The Sun
- Christopher Lamb (University) – Rome correspondent for The Tablet
- Colin McDowell (Hatfield) – fashion writer and journalist
- Andrew Norfolk (Hild Bede) – chief investigative reporter for The Times, known for work exposing the Rotherham child sexual exploitation scandal
- Sebastian Payne (Van Mildert) – journalist
- Hugh Pearman (St. Chad's) - architecture critic for The Sunday Times 1986-2016, editor and author
- Manveen Rana (University) – reporter, Today Programme
- Jonathan Wilson (Grad Soc) – football journalist, founder and editor of The Blizzard

=== Poets, dramatists and translators ===
- Richard Caddel – poet, publisher and editor
- Julia Copus (St Mary's) – poet, children's writer and biographer, winner of the Forward Prize for Best Single Poem and the National Poetry Competition
- James Kirkup (Grey) – travel writer, poet, novelist, playwright, translator, broadcaster, Hon. Fellow Grey College from 1992
- Liz Lefroy (St Mary's) – poet, winner of Roy Fisher prize (2011)
- Alan Plater (King's) – playwright and TV writer
- Tina Kover (Ustinov) – translator
- Rachel McCarthy (University) – poet, critic and broadcaster
- David Mercer (King's) – English playwright and dramatist
- Michael O'Neill – poet and academic

=== Miscellaneous ===
- Dave Anderson (Collingwood) – cartoon and animation writer
- Lucy Beresford (Trevelyan) – writer, psychotherapist and media commentator
- John Galbraith Graham (St Chad's) – crossword compiler, "Araucaria" of The Guardian; Chaplain and tutor at St Chad's 1949–52
- Jack Edwards (St Cuthbert's) - YouTuber and author
- Joseph Stevenson (University) – English Catholic archivist

== Explorers ==
- Stephanie Solomonides, first Cypriot to reach both the North and South Poles

== Other notable people ==
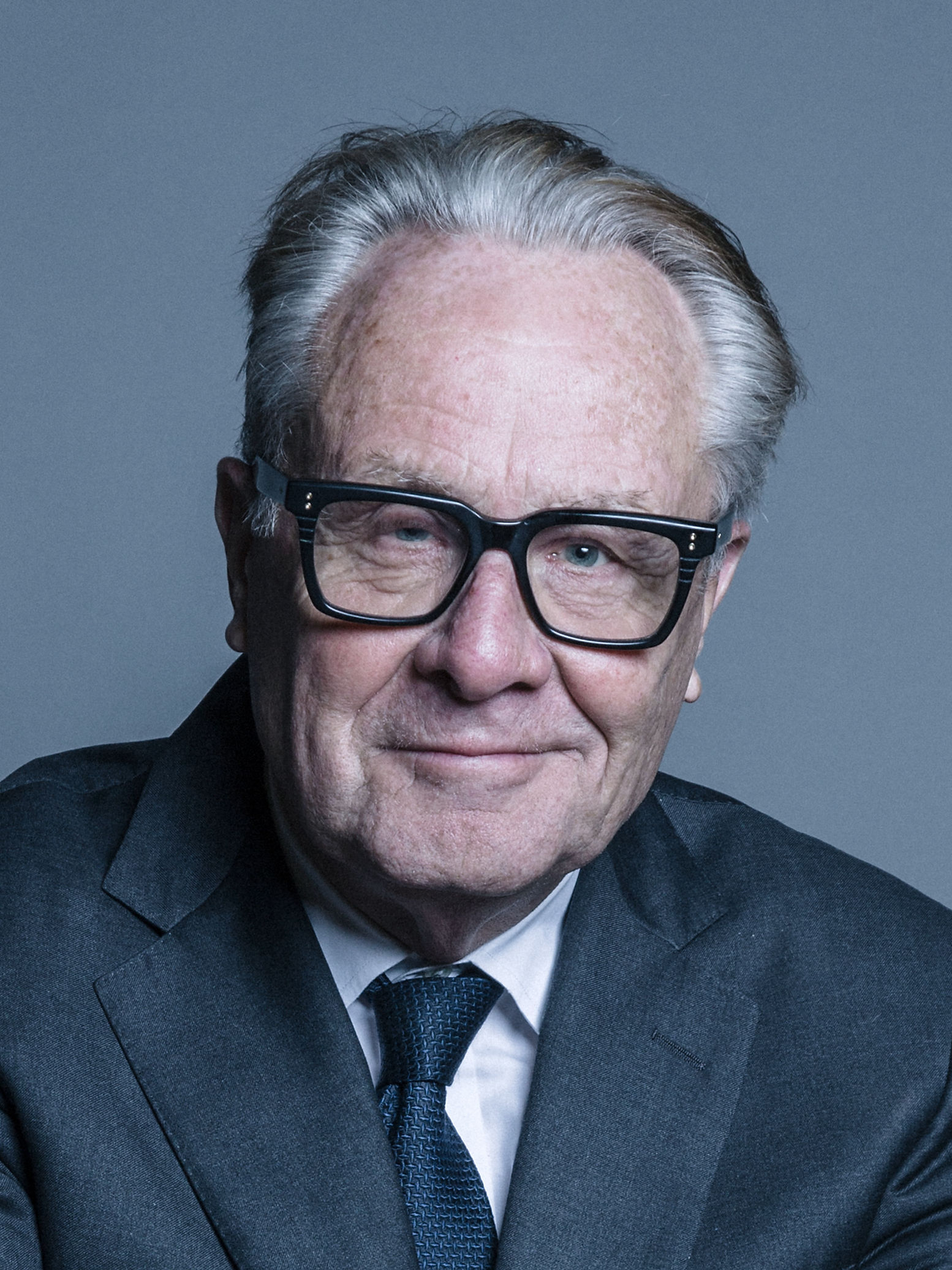
Patrick Carter, Baron Carter of Coles, Ex-Chairman of Sport England

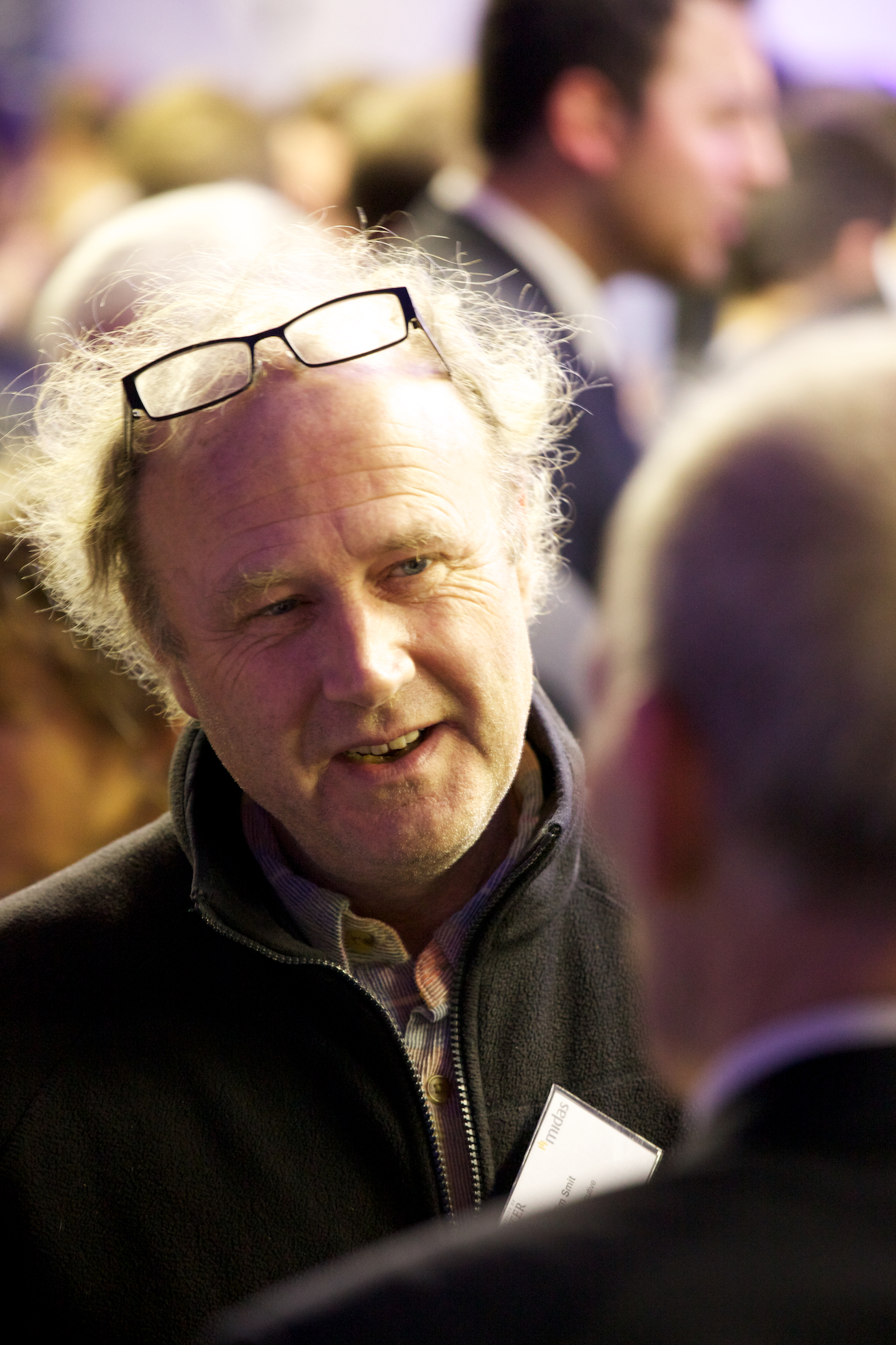
Tim Smit, founder of the Eden Project

- Stephen Bicknell (St Chad's) – leading British organ builder and lecturer at the Royal Academy of Music
- Patrick Carter, Baron Carter of Coles (Hatfield) – Chairman of Sport England (2002–06)
- E. C. B. Corlett – naval architect and consultant, pivotal in the restoration of the SS Great Britain
- Sarah Everard (St Cuthbert's) – marketing executive murdered by a Metropolitan Police officer on 4 March 2021
- Sir Terry Farrell (King's) – architect (the MI6 Building, Charing Cross railway station, KK100, Shenzhen)
- Harry Faulkner-Brown (King's) – architect, particularly known for his work on Jesmond Library and the Newcastle Metro
- Katharine Gun (St Mary's) – former translator for GCHQ and whistle-blower of information concerning USA activities in their push for the 2003 invasion of Iraq
- Dame Elisabeth Hoodless (King's) – Executive Director of Community Service Volunteers
- Jack Lynn (King's) – architect
- Ian McCafferty (Van Mildert) – member of the Bank of England's Monetary Policy Committee
- David Rock (King's) – architect RIBA President 1997-99
- Gordon Ryder (King's) – architect
- Thomas Sharp – town planner, academic in the School of Architecture at King's College 1937–1945, president of the Town Planning Institute
- Tim Smit (Hatfield) – horticulturalist and creator of the Eden Project
- Alison and Peter Smithson (King's) – pioneers of brutalist architecture
- Michael Spurr (St Chad's) – Director of Operations, HM Prison Service
- David Walton (Van Mildert) – economist, member of the Bank of England's Monetary Policy Committee
- Rupert Whitaker (Hild Bede) – founder and chairman of the Tuke Institute; co-founder of the Terence Higgins Trust
- Sir William Whitfield (King's) – architect
- Robert Beckley (University) - Police Officer
- Rowan Ellis – Youtuber and LGBT rights activist
