= List of alumni of Hatfield College, Durham =

Hatfield College, Durham is one of the constituent colleges of Durham University.

Founded in 1846 by the reformist clergyman David Melville as Bishop Hatfield's Hall, the college is known for pioneering the system of catered student halls with prices for board and lodgings fixed in advance.

While early Hatfield students tended to follow careers in the church, contemporary alumni also include figures in academia, government, business, the arts, and sport. The following is a list of notable people to have matriculated.

== Academia ==
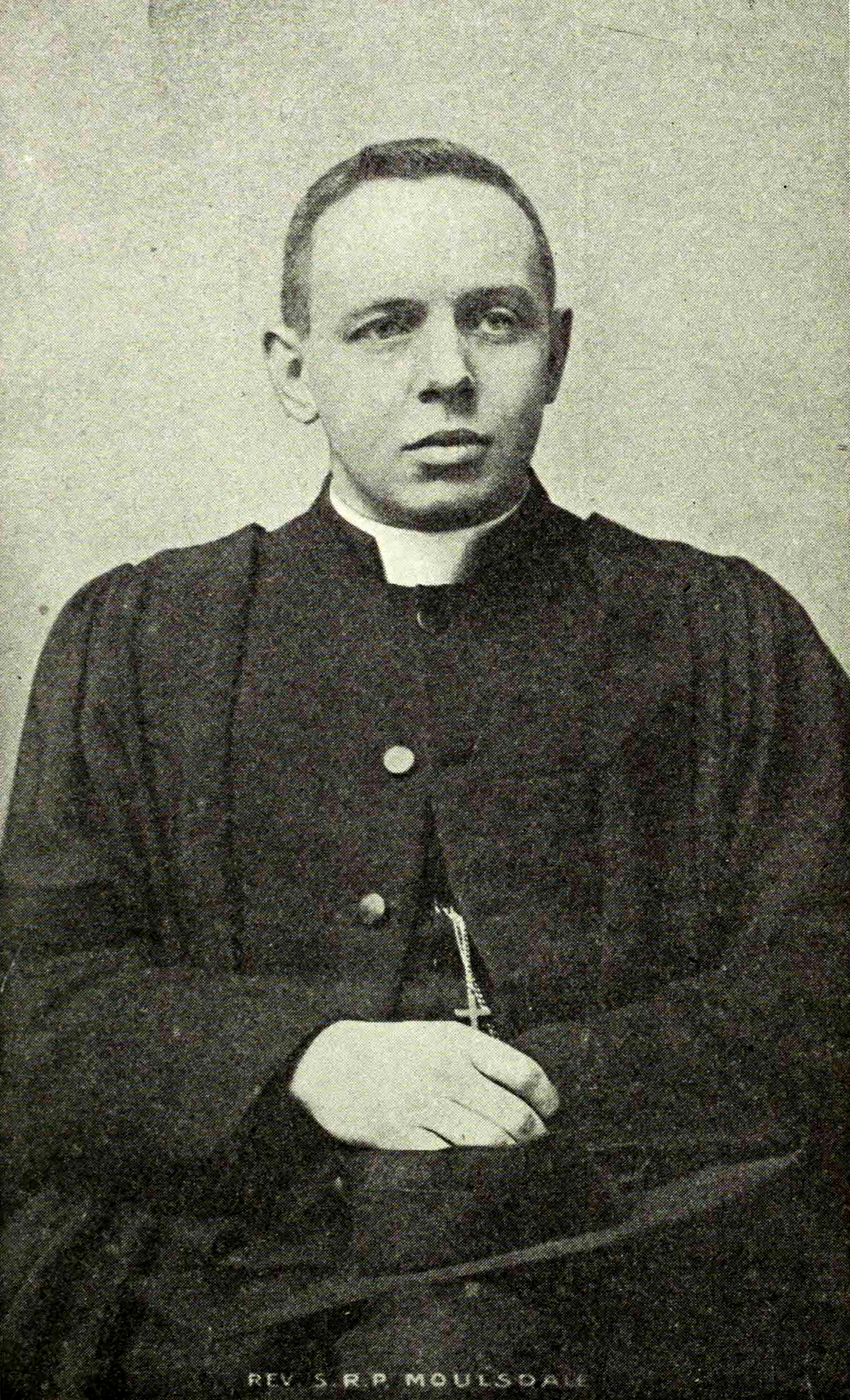
Stephen Moulsdale

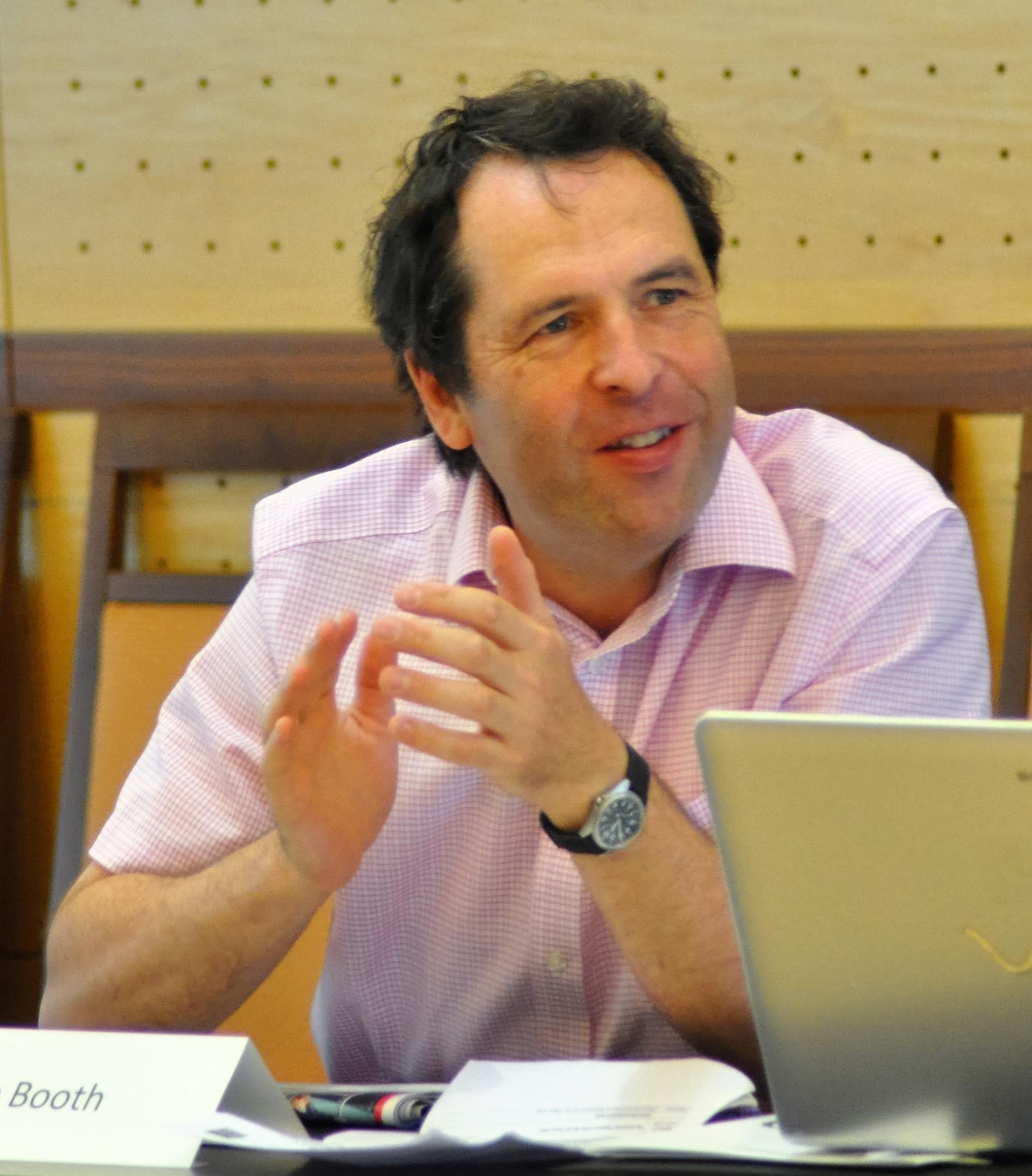
Philip Booth

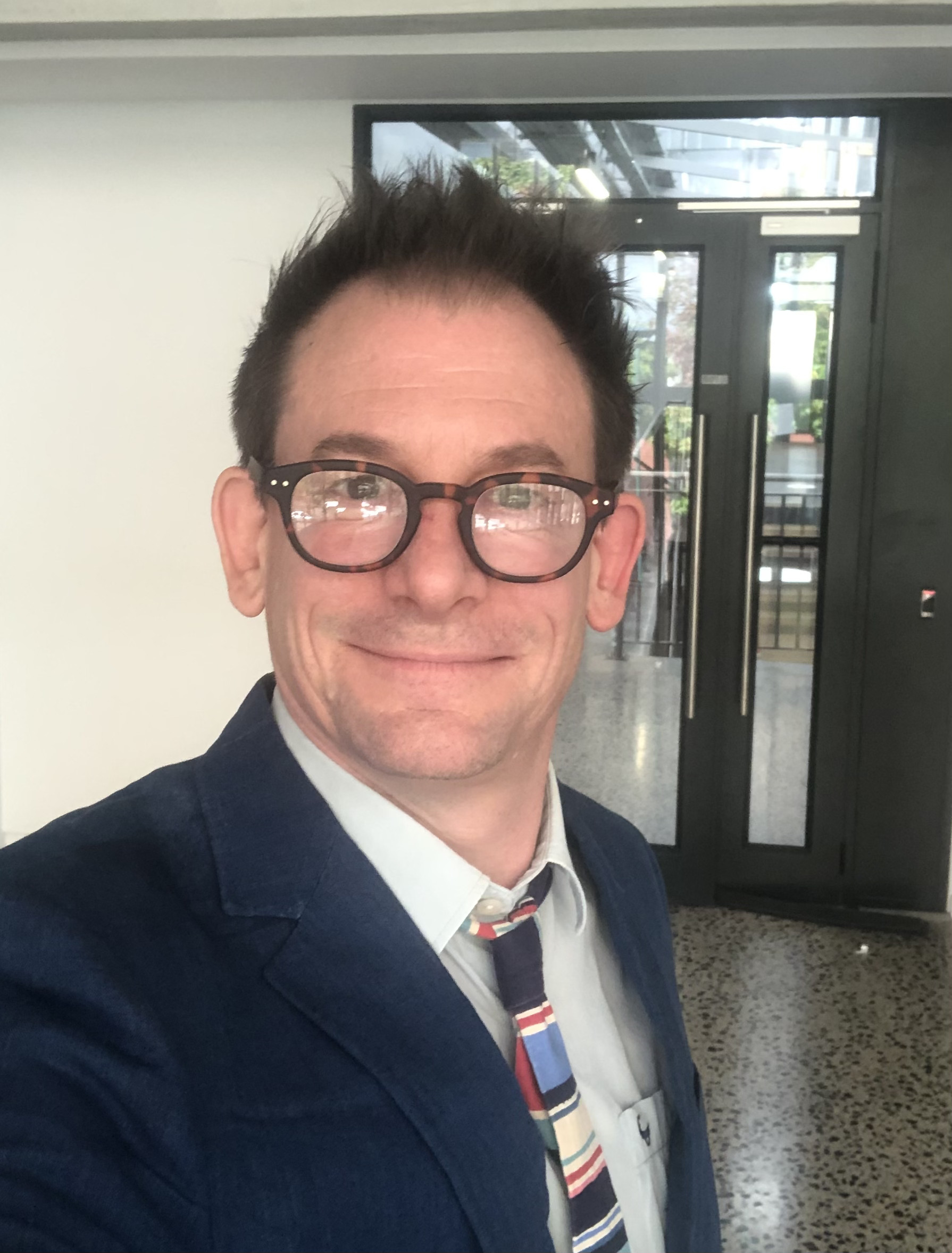
Sam Challis

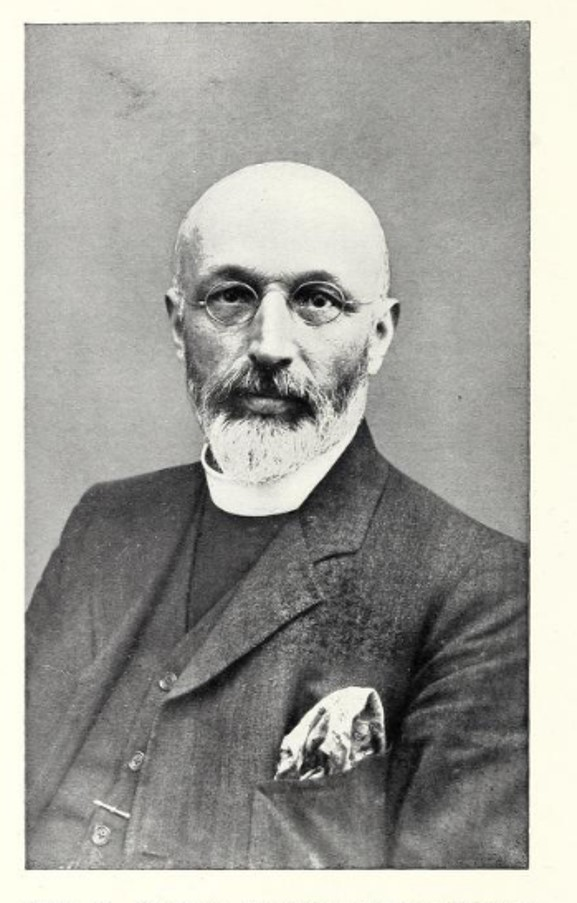
Adrian Woodruffe-Peacock

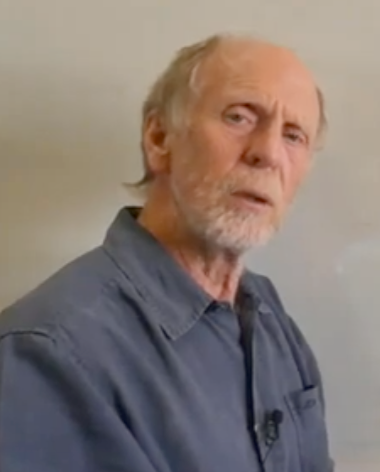
Richard Arculus

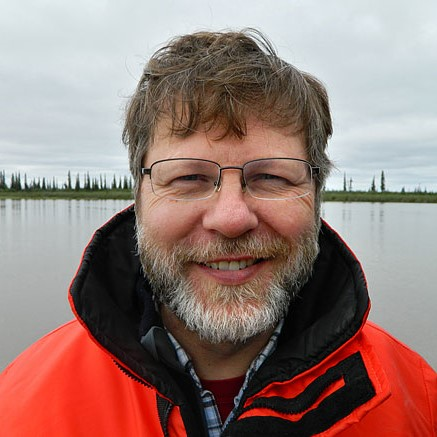
Chris Burn

=== Academic administrators ===
- Gordon Cameron – Master of Fitzwilliam College, Cambridge (1988–1990)
- Sidney Holgate – Master of Grey College, Durham (1959–1980)
- David Jasper – Principal of St Chad's College, Durham (1989–1991)
- Stephen Moulsdale – Principal of St Chad's College, Durham (1904–1937)
- Philip Ogden – Acting Principal of Queen Mary University of London (2008–2009)
- Arthur Prowse – Principal of Van Mildert College, Durham (1965–1972)
- Ian Taylor – Principal of Van Mildert College, Durham (1999–2000)

=== Professors and researchers ===
==== Humanities and Social Science ====
- John Atkinson – Emeritus Professor of Classics at the University of Cape Town
- Philip Booth – Dean of the Faculty of Education, Humanities and Social Sciences at St Mary's University, Twickenham
- Richard Calland – Emeritus Associate Professor of Public Law at the University of Cape Town; Head of Political Monitoring & Information Service at IDASA (1995–2011)
- Tim Carter – David G. Frey Distinguished Professor Emeritus in the Department of Music at the University of North Carolina at Chapel Hill
- Sam Challis – Director of the Rock Art Research Institute (RARI) at the University of the Witwatersrand
- Cecil William Davidge – Professor of English at University College of Commerce, Kobe (1907–1930); Tutor of Hirohito
- Roy W. Davies – historian of the Roman army; Service in the Roman Army (1989)
- Brian Dobson – Reader Emeritus of Archaeology at Durham University; President of the Society of Antiquaries of Newcastle
- Paul du Gay – Professor, Department of Organization at Copenhagen Business School
- Paul Edwards – Professor of English and African Literature at the University of Edinburgh
- Robert Malcolm Errington – Emeritus Professor of Ancient History at the University of Marburg
- Allan M. Findlay – Emeritus Professor of Geography at the University of St Andrews
- Simon J. Gathercole – Professor of New Testament and Early Christianity and Director of Studies at Fitzwilliam College, Cambridge
- George Gretton – Lord President Reid Professor of Law at the University of Edinburgh (1994–2016); Commissioner of the Scottish Law Commission (2006–2011)
- Mark Reginald Hull – archaeologist and curator of the Colchester and Essex museum
- Michael Jarrett – Professor of Archaeology at Cardiff University
- Peter Manning – Professor of Music at Durham University (1996–2015)
- Paul D. Murray – Professor of Systematic Theology at Durham University
- Harold Orton – Professor of English Language and Medieval English Literature, University of Leeds (1946–64)
- Angelo Raine – clergyman scholar active in the Yorkshire Philosophical Society
- David Reeder – Lecturer in Urban History, University of Leicester
- John Spaul – epigrapher and scholar on the Army of the Roman Empire
- Gareth Stansfield – Professor of Middle East Studies at University of Exeter
- Maurice Whitehead – Director of Heritage Collections and Schwarzenbach Research Fellow at English College, Rome
- Adrian Woodruffe-Peacock – pioneering ecologist and former President of the Lincolnshire Naturalists' Union
- Ted Wragg – Professor of Education at the University of Exeter (1978–2003)

==== Science ====
- Cliff Addison – Professor of Inorganic Chemistry at University of Nottingham (1960–78)
- Richard Arculus – Professor in School of Earth Sciences at Australian National University
- David Axon – Professor at the University of Hertfordshire and Rochester Institute of Technology
- Gilbert Ronald Bainbridge – Wolfson Professor of Energy Studies at Newcastle University
- Christopher Burn – Emeritus Chancellor's Professor of Geography at Carleton University; Polar Medal of Canada (2018)
- Tristram Chivers – Emeritus Professor of Chemistry at University of Calgary
- Keith Clark – Emeritus Professor in the Department of Computing at Imperial College London
- Bethan Davies – Professor of Glaciology at Newcastle University
- Kingsley Dunham – Director of the British Geological Survey (1967–75); Wollaston Medal (1976)
- Nigel Glover – Professor of Physics at Durham University
- Rebecca Goss – Professor of Organic Chemistry at University of St. Andrews (2018–)
- Joseph Holden – Professor of Physical Geography at University of Leeds (2007–)
- Joanne Johnson – British Antarctic Survey geochemist; Polar Medal (2023)
- Basil Charles King – Professor of Geology at Bedford College; Bigsby Medal (1959)
- Geoffrey King – Senior Research Professor in Geophysics at the Institut de Physique du Globe de Paris
- Peter Kyberd – Biomedical engineer; Head of the School of the Built and Natural Environment at University of Derby
- Nicholas Long – Sir Edward Frankland BP Professor of Inorganic Chemistry at Imperial College London (2011–)
- Mosobalaje Oyawoye – Professor of Geology at the University of Ibadan (1966–1977)
- Ian Parsons – Emeritus Professor of Mineralogy at the University of Edinburgh
- Brian Scarlett – Professor of Chemical Technology at Delft University of Technology (1983–2000)
- Joe Smartt – Reader in Biology at Southampton University (1990–96)
- Graham Smith – Particle physicist; Head of Instrumentation Division at Brookhaven National Laboratory (2012–2017)
- Mark A. Smith – Professor of Pathology at Case Western Reserve University
- W C Swinbank – Meteorological physicist; Chief Research Scientist at CSIRO Australia (1961–1971)
- David Vaughan – Scientist at British Antarctic Survey; Lead Author on IPCC Fourth Assessment Report
- Howard Wilson – Director of Science and Technology for the Spherical Tokamak for Energy Production (STEP) programme (2025–)
- Stan Woodell – Lecturer in Botany at Oxford University (1959–88); emeritus Fellow of Wolfson College, Oxford (1989–2004)
- Philip Woodworth – Oceanographer; former Director of the Permanent Service for Mean Sea Level

== Business ==
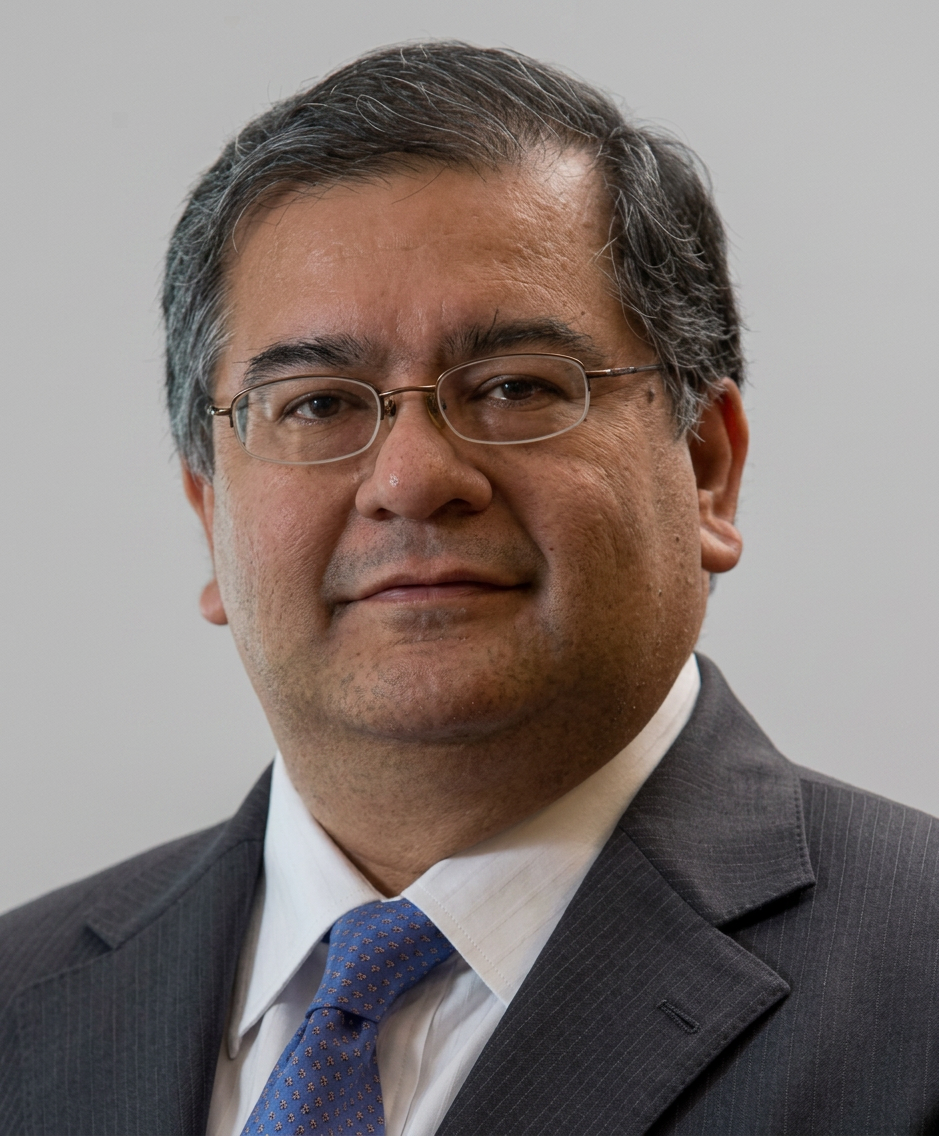
Faiz Azmi

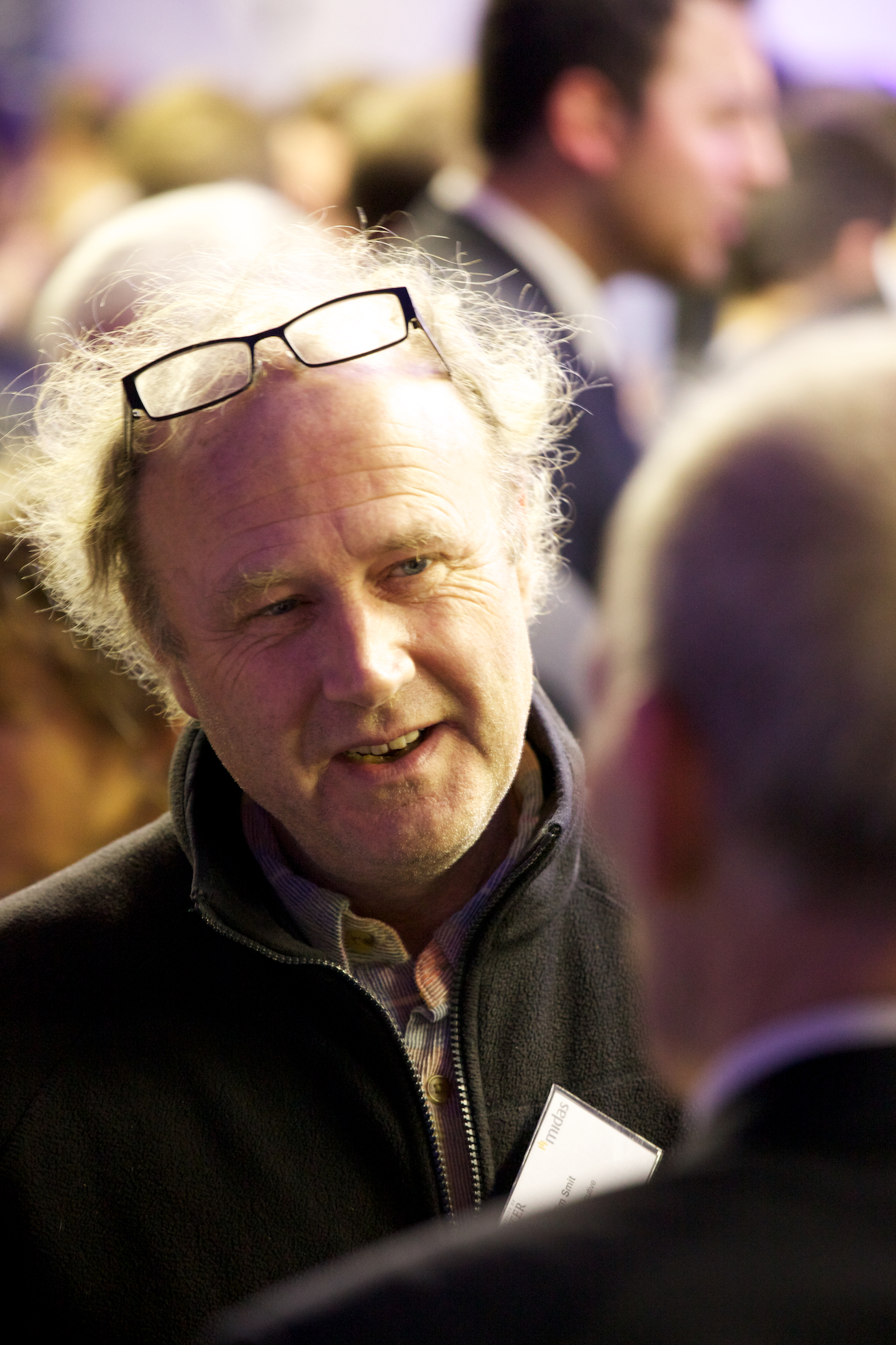
Tim Smit

- David Arkless – Founder and Chairman of ArkLight Consulting Group; President of End Human Trafficking Now (2011–)
- Mohammad Faiz Azmi – Executive Chairman of Securities Commission Malaysia (2024–)
- Jonathan Beckett – Chief Executive of Burgess Yachts
- Richard Burge – Founder of ESG Validation; CEO of Countryside Alliance (1999–2003)
- Mark Cunliffe-Lister, 4th Earl of Swinton – Owner of Swinton Park Hotel
- George Guise – gold-mining executive and policy adviser to Margaret Thatcher (1986–1990)
- Simon Hill-Norton – co-founder and CEO of Sweaty Betty
- Tony Laithwaite – Chairman of Laithwaites Wine
- Ian Marchant – Chairman of Thames Water (2018–2023)
- Peter Owen Edmunds – telecoms entrepreneur in Russia; co-founded Peterstar
- Richard Paniguian – Group Vice-president at BP (2002–2008), Head of Defence and Security Organisation (DSO) (2008–2015)
- Richard Pease, 4th Baronet – Head of Crux Asset Management (2015–2023)
- Rachel Skinner – President of the Institution of Civil Engineers (2020–2021)
- Tim Smit – co-creator of Lost Gardens of Heligan and the Eden Project
- Oliver Tress – founder and CEO of Oliver Bonas
- Michael Warrender, 3rd Baron Bruntisfield – Director at Concordia Advisors (2005–2014)
- Stephen Welton – CEO of Business Growth Fund (2011–)

== Media and performing arts ==
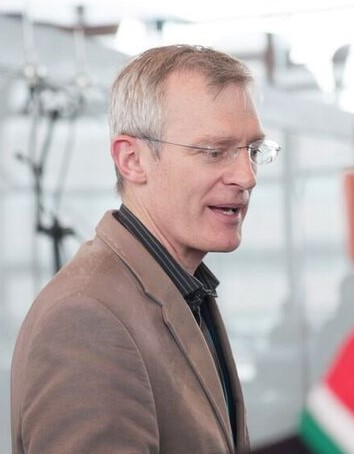
Jeremy Vine

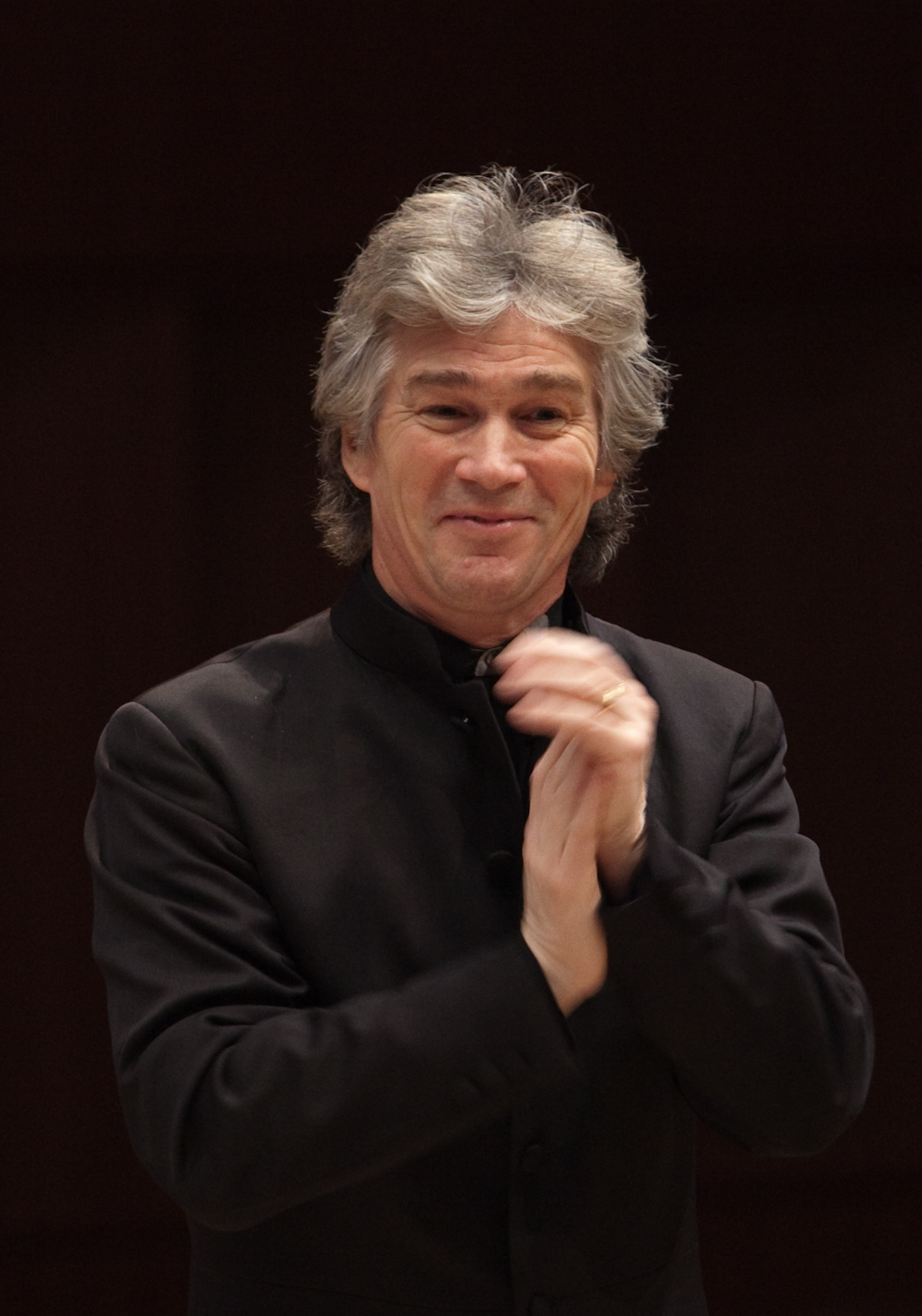
Jonathan Darlington

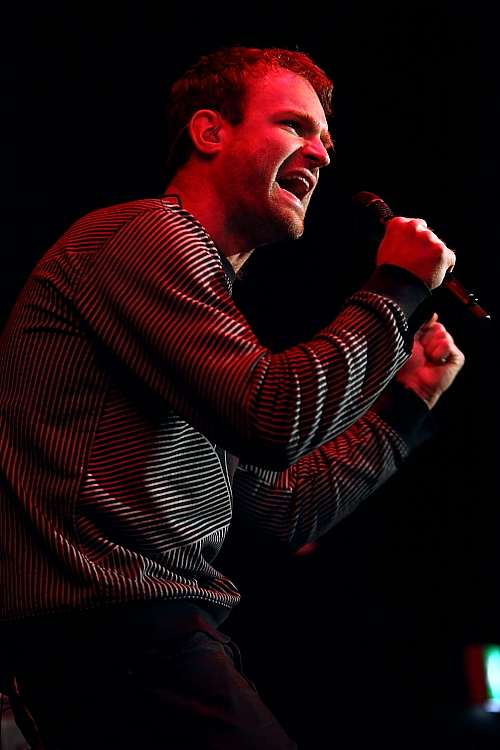
Tim Exile

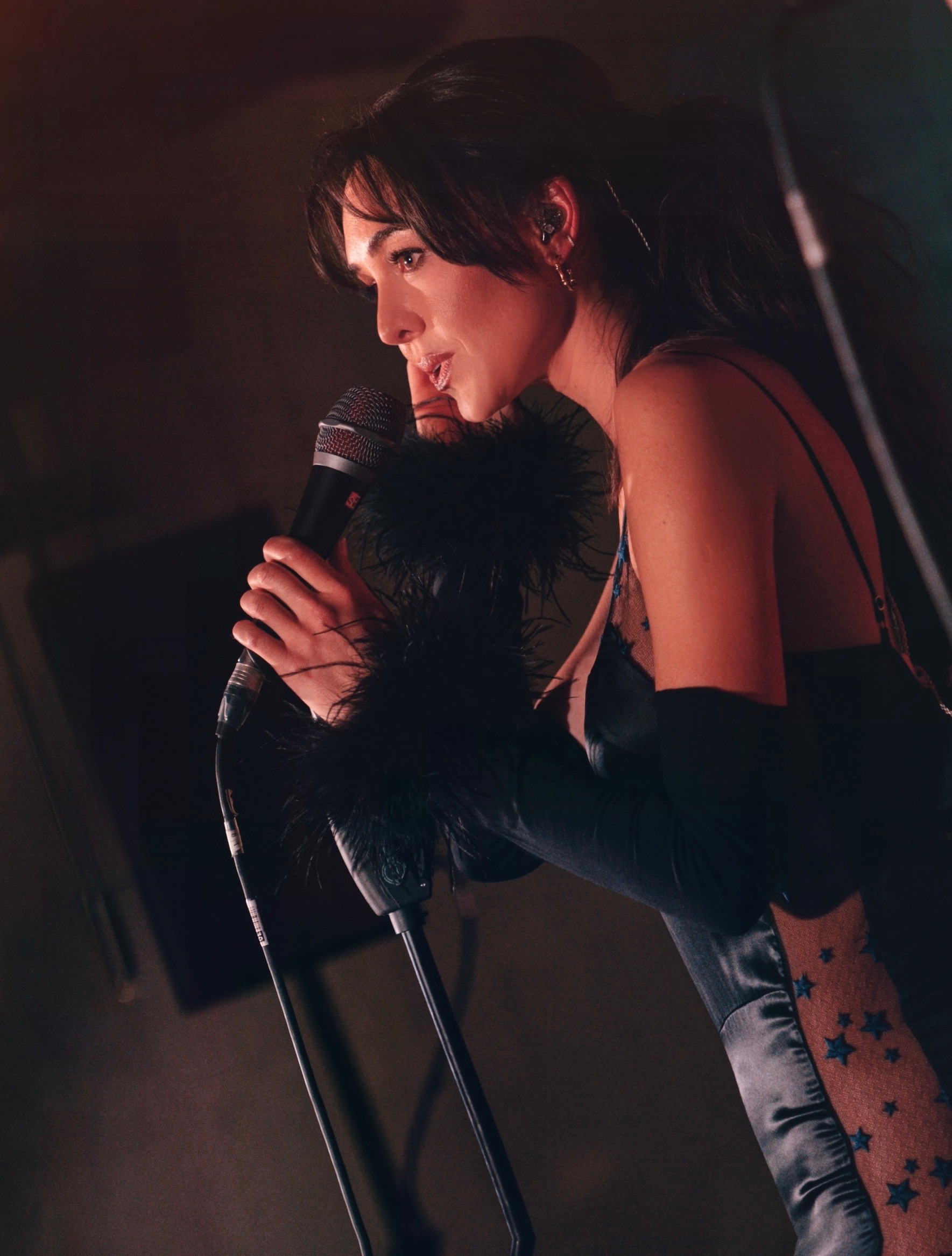
Riva Taylor

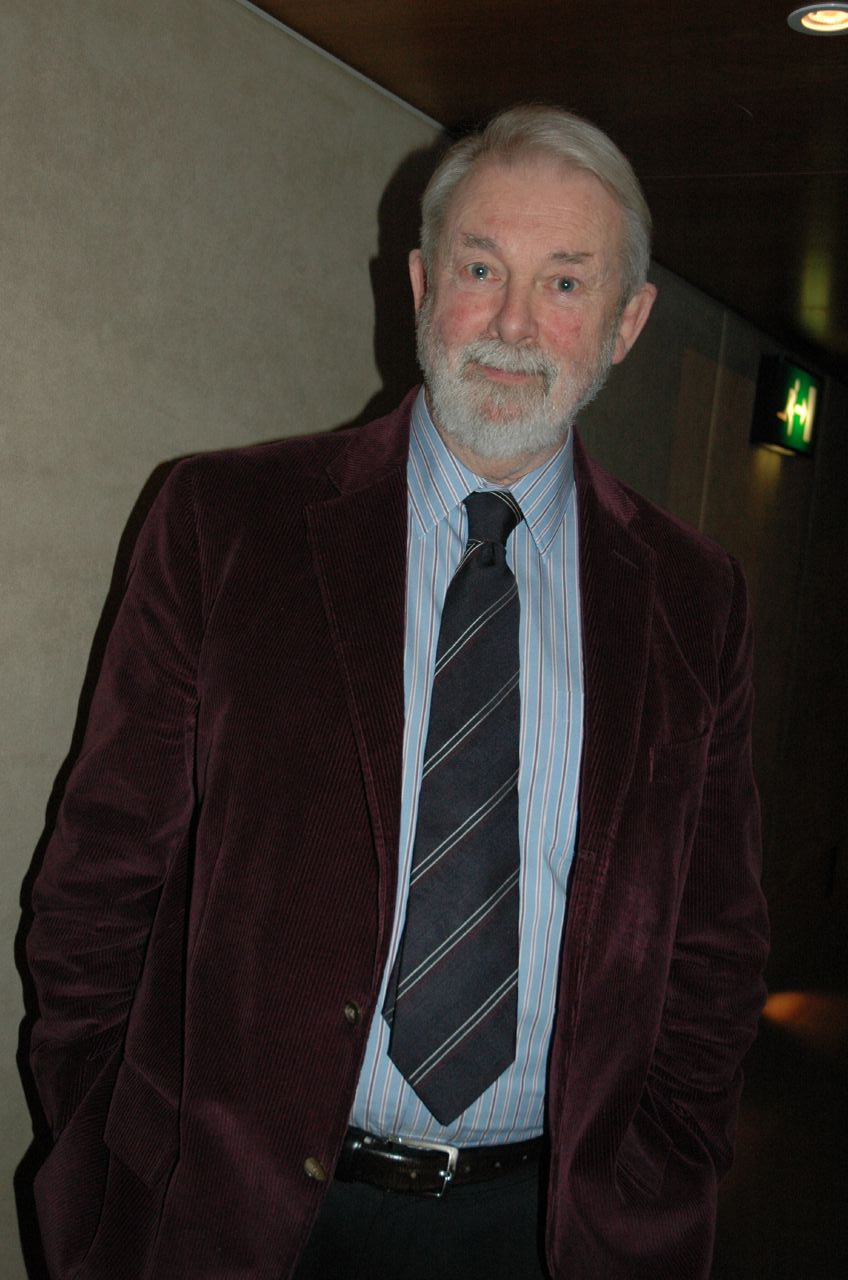
Colin McDowell

=== Film, radio, television and theatre ===
- George Auckland – longtime BBC television and digital media executive
- Delaval Astley, 23rd Baron Hastings – played Cameron Fraser on The Archers
- Kieron Barry – playwright; Stockwell (2009)
- Fergus Beeley – BBC Natural World producer and documentarian
- Benedict Bermange – Sky Sports cricket statistician
- Bill Bunbury – ABC radio producer
- James Cary – TV and radio comedy writer, Think the Unthinkable and Bluestone 42
- Stuart Draper – theatre actor and director
- Mark Durden-Smith – Channel 5 sports presenter
- Ed Gamble – stand-up and performer, The Peacock and Gamble Podcast and Mock the Week
- Jonathan Gould – sports presenter; MLB on Five (1997–2008)
- Mark Pougatch – ITV Sport presenter
- Ian Sharp – film and television director known for Who Dares Wins (1982) and his second-unit work on GoldenEye (1995)
- Jeremy Vine – broadcaster and journalist; Panorama (2007–2010) Eggheads (2008–present)

=== Music ===
- Jonathan Darlington – Generalmusikdirektor of the Duisburg Philharmonic (2002–2011)
- Tim Exile – drum and bass producer
- Malcolm Goldring – conductor and musical director
- Paul Keenan – composer of contemporary classical music
- Shelly Knotts – composer and performer of electronic, live coded and networked music
- Alec Roth – composer best known for Arion and the Dolphin (1994)
- Riva Taylor – jazz singer-songwriter; This Woman's Heart .1 (2020) and This Woman's Heart .2 (2021)
- Jake Thackray – folk musician; The Last Will and Testament of Jake Thackray (1967)

=== Writing and journalism ===
- Poppy Adams – author and television director; The Behaviour of Moths (2008)
- Oliver Balch – author and freelance journalist; Viva South America! A Journey Round a Restless Continent (2009)
- Thomas Blackburn – poet, novelist and memoirist; A Clip of Steel (1969)
- Dominic Carman – legal affairs journalist; former feature writer for The Times
- Alexander Frater – author and travel editor; Chasing the Monsoon (1990)
- Frederick Grice – writer of children's literature; The Bonny Pit Laddie (1960)
- John Kay – chief reporter for The Sun
- Colin McDowell – former Fashion Editor of The Sunday Times
- Stephen Pern – travel writer; The Great Divide: A Walk Through America Along the Continental Divide (1987)
- Katharine Preston – writer and public speaker; Out With It: How Stuttering Helped Me Find My Voice (2013)
- Rosa Rankin-Gee – novelist; The Last King of Sark (2011) and Dreamland (2021)
- Ian Rodger – radio critic for The Listener and The Guardian
- Alan Schom – popular historian; Napoleon Bonaparte, A Biography (1997)
- Ruth Sherlock – journalist; international correspondent for NPR
- David Shukman – Science Editor of BBC News (2012–2021); Reporting Live from the End of the World (2010)
- Owen Slot – sports journalist; Chief Rugby Correspondent at The Times

== Military and law enforcement ==
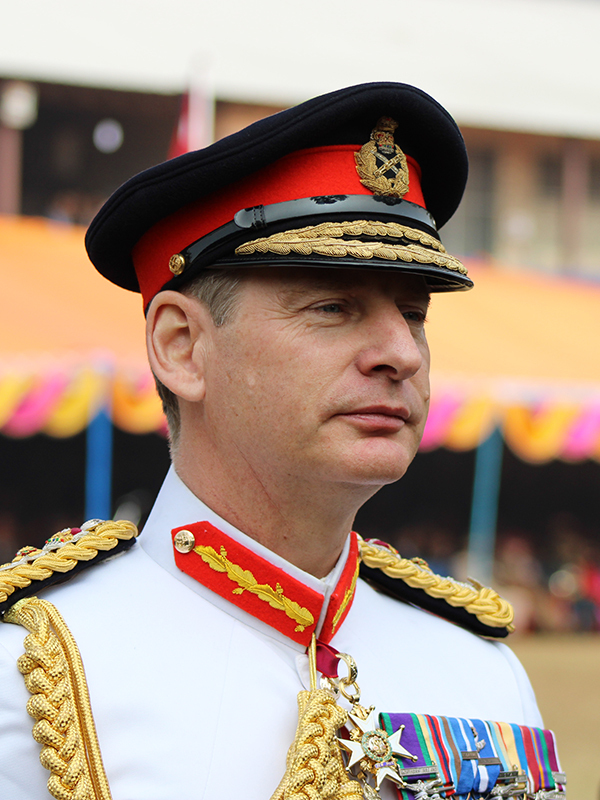
Mark Carleton-Smith

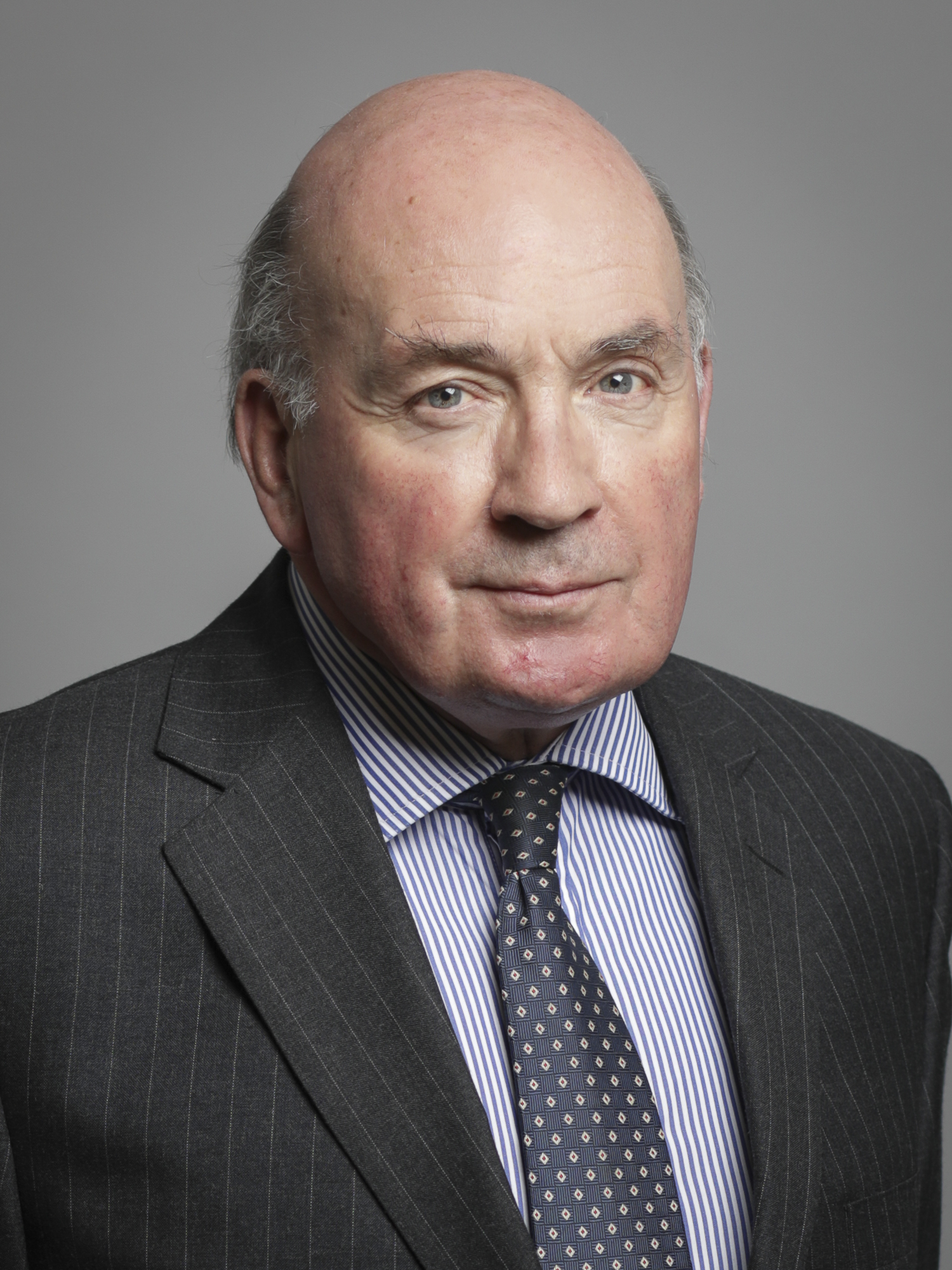
Richard Dannatt

=== British Army ===
- General Sir Mark Carleton-Smith – Chief of the General Staff (2018–2022)
- General Sir Richard Dannatt – Chief of the General Staff (2006–2009)
- Major-General Peter Grant Peterkin – Military Secretary (2000–2004)
- Major-General Alex Taylor – Director, Army Legal Services (2019–2024)

=== Royal Air Force ===
- Air Marshal Peter Walker – Commander of Joint Warfare Centre (2005–2007); Lieutenant Governor of Guernsey (2011–2015)

=== Royal Navy ===
- Rear Admiral Andrew Burns – Fleet Commander (2021–)
- Rear Admiral Matthew Parr – Commander Operations (2013–2015)

=== Police ===
- Laurence Taylor – Assistant Commissioner of the Metropolitan Police Service and Head of Counter Terrorism Policing
- Giles York – Chief Constable of Sussex Police (2014–2020)

== Politics and government ==
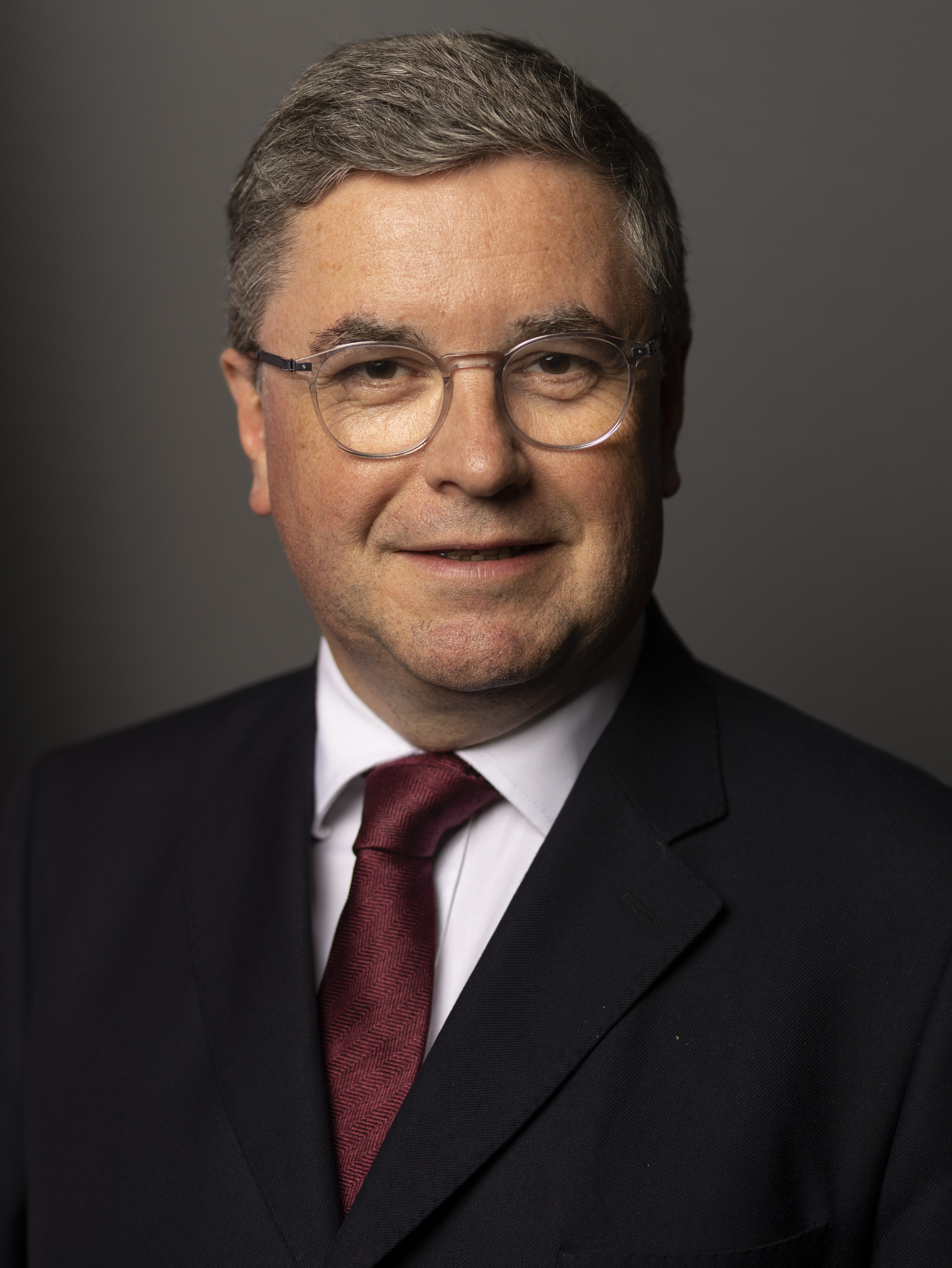
Robert Buckland

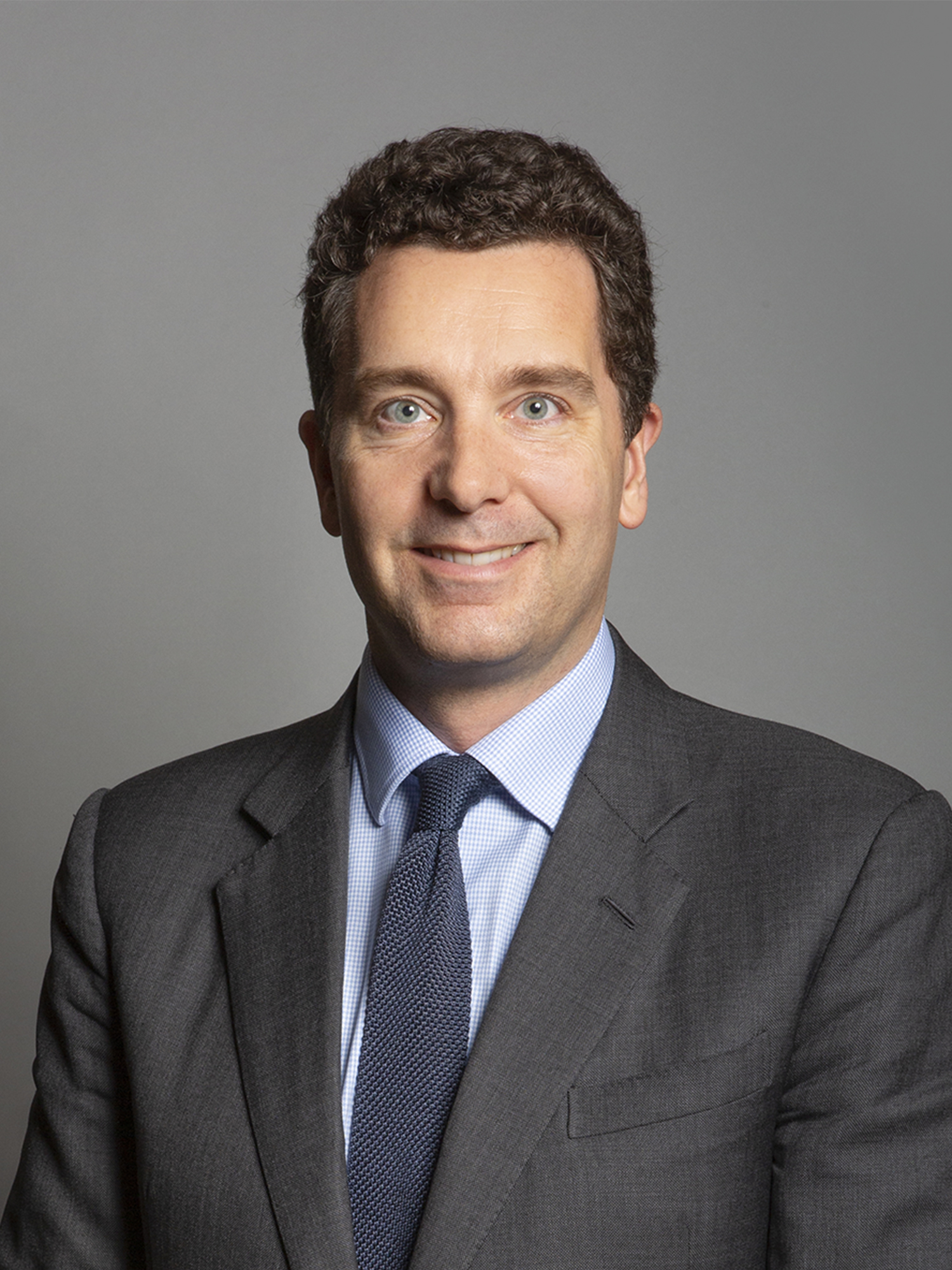
Edward Timpson

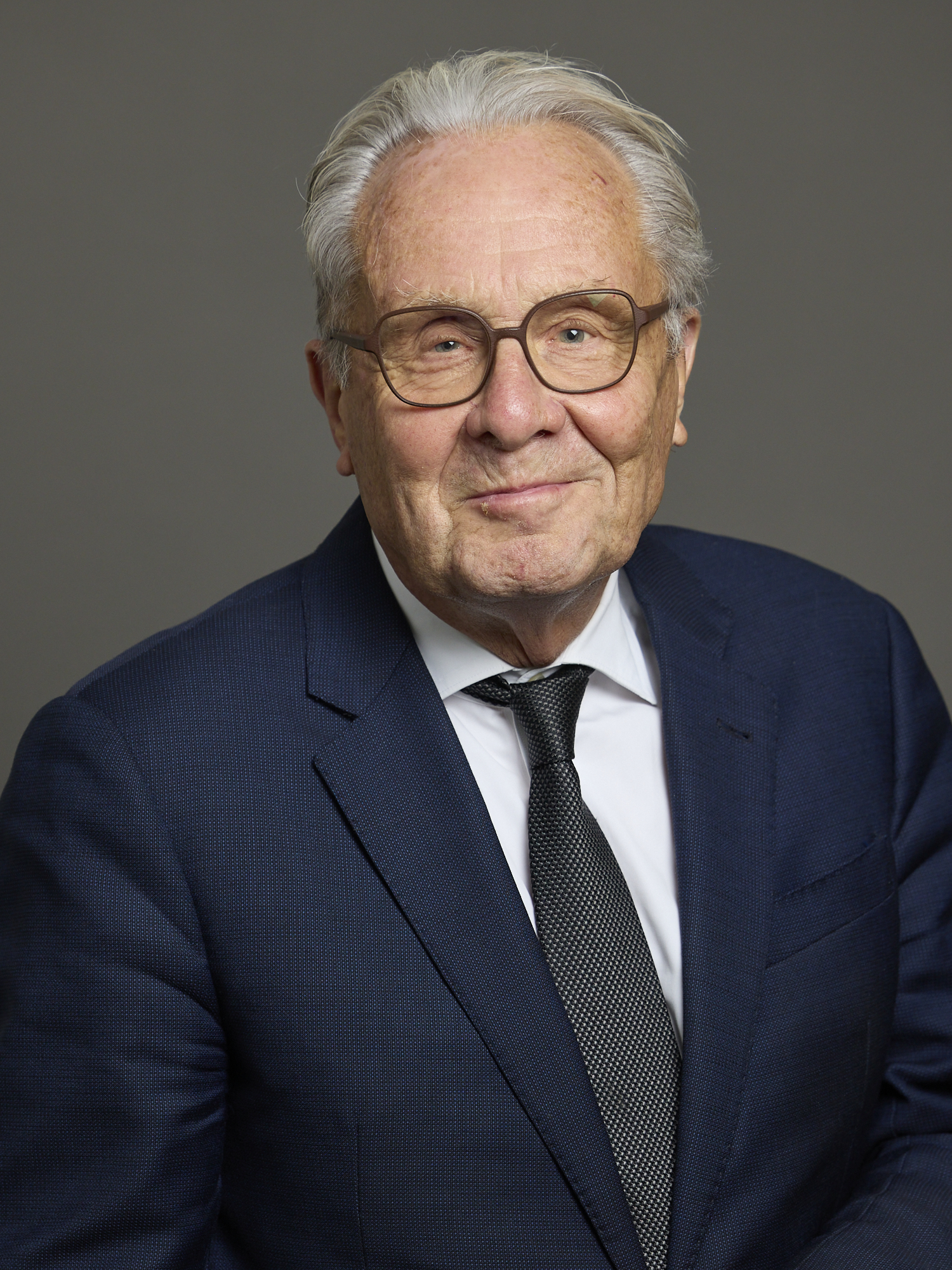
Baron Carter of Coles

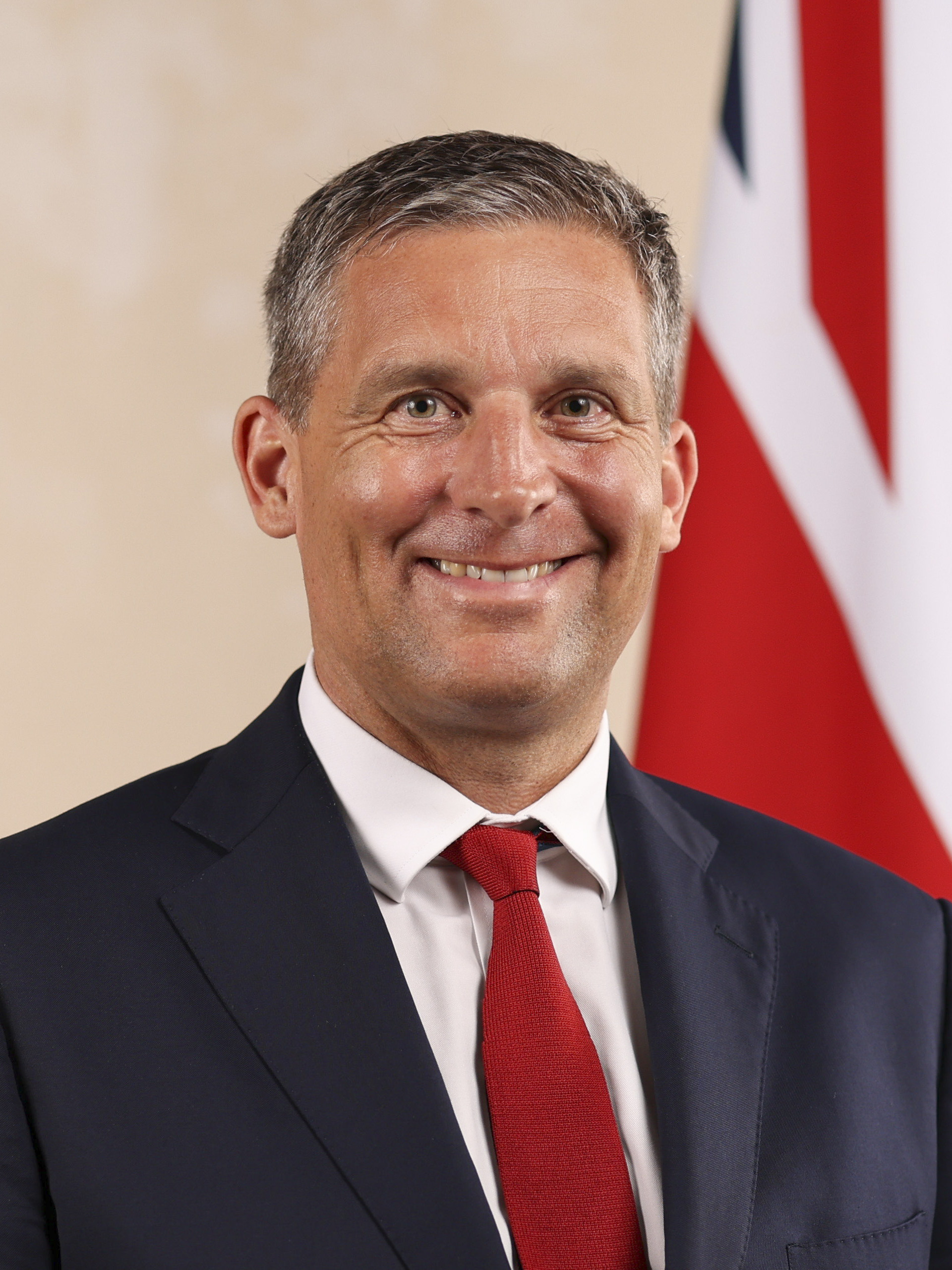
James Timpson

=== Parliament of the United Kingdom ===
==== Members of the House of Commons ====
- Robert Buckland – Conservative MP for South Swindon (2010–2024); Secretary of State for Justice (2019–2021)
- Robert Strother Stewart – Liberal MP for Stockton-on-Tees (1923–1924)
- Edward Timpson – Conservative MP for Crewe and Nantwich (2008–2017) and for Eddisbury (2019–2024); Solicitor General for England and Wales (2022)

==== Members of the House of Lords ====
- Patrick Carter, Baron Carter of Coles – Labour Party life peer (2004–)
- James Timpson, Baron Timpson – Minister of State for Prisons, Parole and Probation (2024–2026)

=== European Parliament ===
- Jake Pugh – Brexit Party MEP for Yorkshire and the Humber (2019–2020)

=== Civil Service ===
- Amanda Brooks – Interim Permanent Secretary of the Department for Business and Trade (2026–)

=== Colonial Service ===
- John Rawling Todd – Secretary for Housing, British Hong Kong (1986–1988)
- John Francis Yaxley – Hong Kong Commissioner in London (1989–1993)

=== HM Diplomatic Service ===
==== Ambassadors and High Commissioners ====
- Bruce Bucknell – British Ambassador to Belarus (2012–2016)
- David Carter – British High Commissioner to Bangladesh (2000–2004)
- Kim Darroch – UK Permanent Representative to the European Union (2007–2011), British Ambassador to the United States (2016–2019)
- David Fitton – British High Commissioner to Jamaica (2013–2017)
- William Quantrill – British Ambassador to Cameroon (1991–1995)

==== Governors of British Overseas Territories ====
- Peter Waterworth – Governor of Montserrat (2007–2011)

=== International Organisations ===
- Robin Medforth-Mills – Senior Project Officer, UNICEF Office of Emergency Programmes
- Tracy Philipps – Secretary-General of the International Union for Conservation of Nature (IUCN) (1955–1958)

== Religion ==
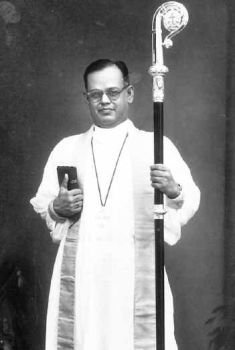
David Chellappa

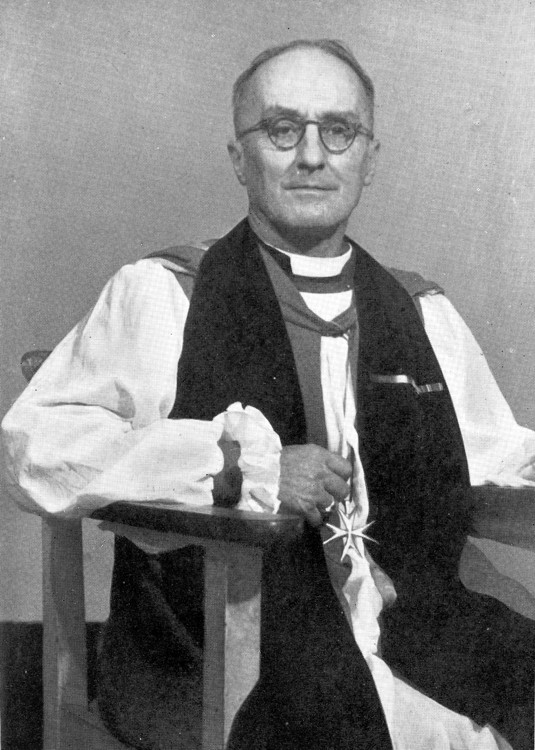
Morris Gelsthorpe

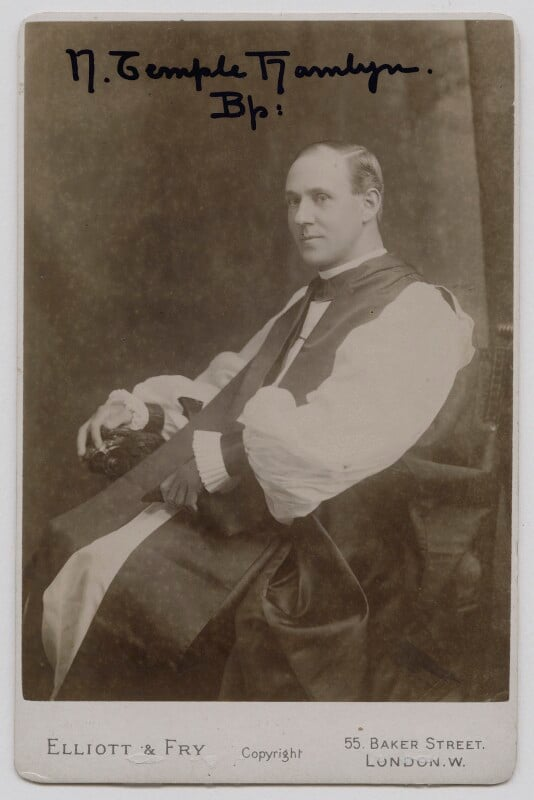
Temple Hamlyn

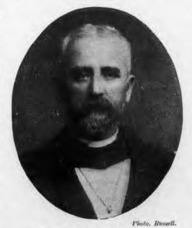
Proctor Swaby

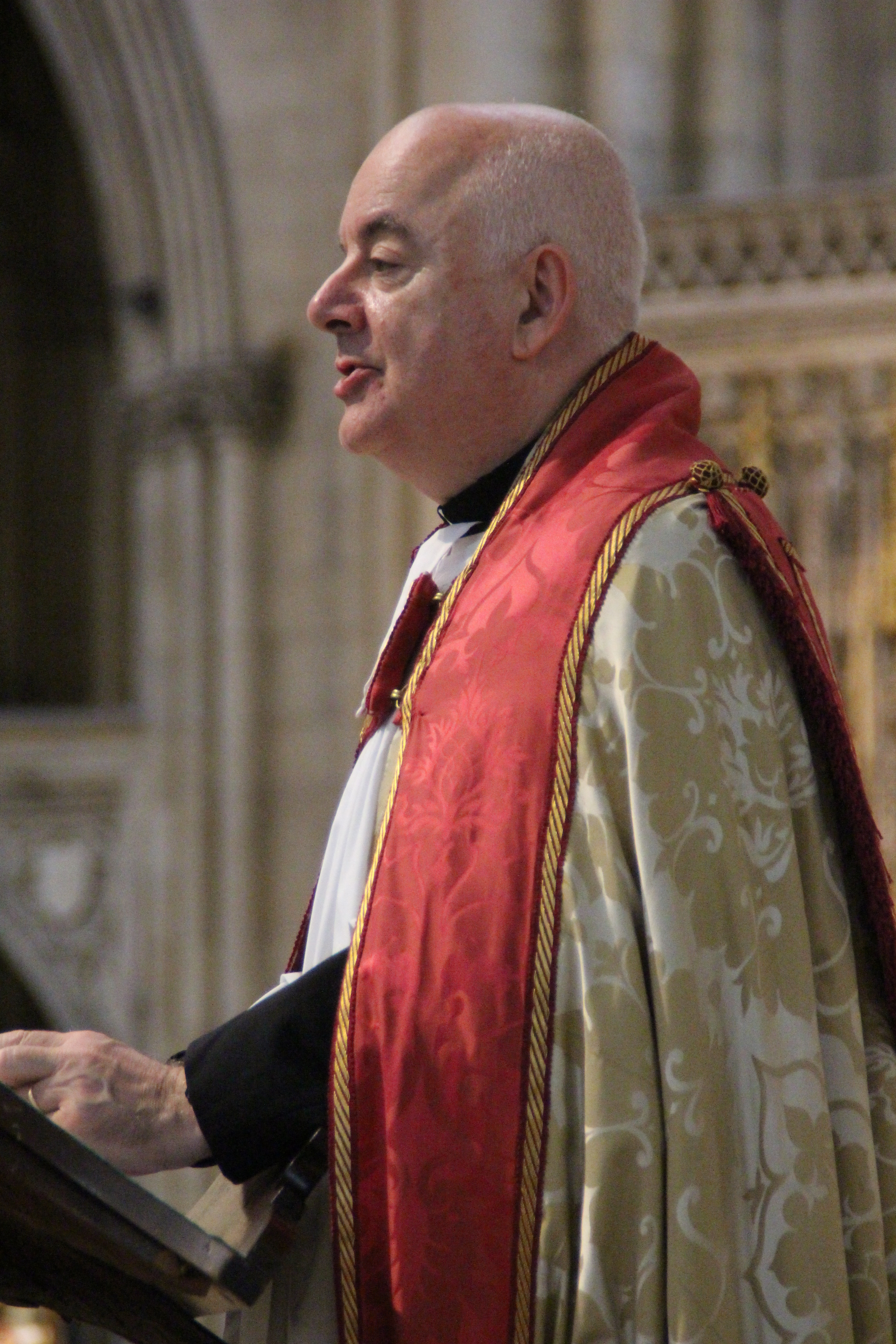
Dominic Barrington

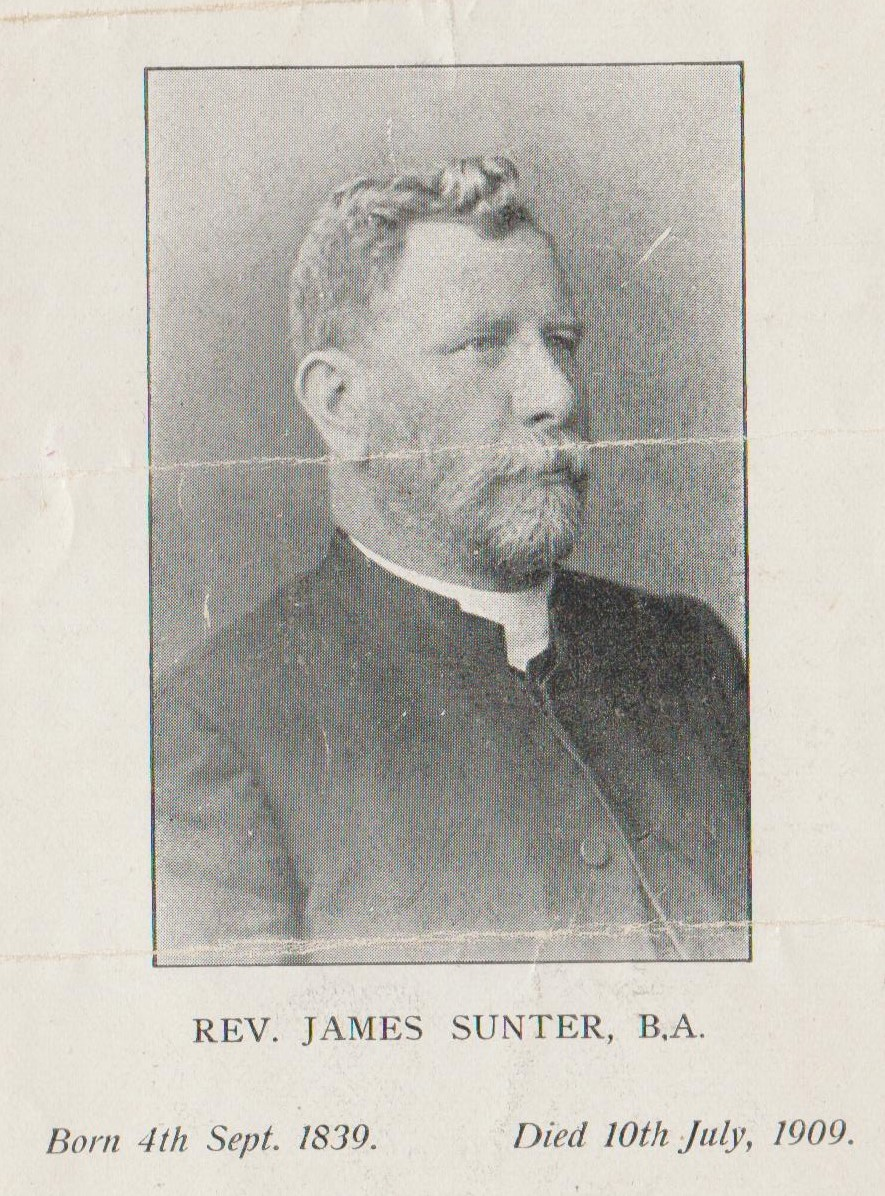
James Sunter

=== Anglican Communion ===
==== Bishops ====
- John Boys – Bishop of Kimberley and Kuruman (1951–1960)
- David Chellappa – Bishop of Madras (1955–1964)
- Peter Dawes – Bishop of Derby (1988–1995)
- Arthur Douglas – Bishop of Aberdeen and Orkney (1883–1905)
- David Edwardes Davies – Bishop of Bangor (1944–1949)
- Morris Gelsthorpe – Bishop in the Sudan (1945–1952)
- Frederick Goldie – Bishop of Glasgow and Galloway (1974–1980)
- Temple Hamlyn – Bishop of Accra (1908–1910)
- Clive Handford – Bishop in Cyprus and the Gulf (1997–2007)
- Ralph Hawkins – Bishop of Bunbury (1957–1977)
- Robert Hay – Bishop of Tasmania (1919–1943)
- Michael Houghton – Bishop of Ebbsfleet (1998–1999)
- Francis Johnston – Bishop of Egypt (1952–1958)
- Oliver Simon – Bishop of Antsiranana (2012–2015)
- Proctor Swaby – Bishop of Guyana (1893–1899); Bishop of Barbados and the Windward Islands (1899–1916)
- Gordon Tindall – Bishop of Grahamstown (1964–1969)

==== Deans and Provosts ====
- Dominic Barrington – Dean of York (2022–)
- William Kay – Provost of Blackburn Cathedral (1936–1961)
- Roderick Mackay – Dean of Edinburgh (1939–1954)
- Alexander MacKenzie – Provost of St Andrew's Cathedral, Inverness (1918–1949)
- Hugh McIntosh – Provost of St Mary's Cathedral, Glasgow (1966–1970)
- Leslie Weatherhead – Dean of Nassau (1965–1972)
- Bill Williams – Provost of Coventry Cathedral (1958–1981)

==== Archdeacons ====
- Henry Carden – Archdeacon of Lahore (1929–1934)
- Alexander Chisholm – Archdeacon of Carlisle (1947–1958)
- Richard Blundell Comins – Archdeacon of Northern Melanesia (1900–1910)
- Herbert Edmonds – Archdeacon of Madras (1937–1940)
- Hugh Edwardes – Archdeacon of Port Elizabeth (1933–1944)
- Glyndwr Hackett – Archdeacon of Monmouth (2001–2008)
- Thomas Hodgson – Archdeacon of Huntingdon (1915–1921)
- Robert Jones – Archdeacon of Worcester (2014–2023)
- George MacDermott – Archdeacon of Norwich (1921–1938)
- Henry Marriott – Archdeacon of Bermuda (1925–1951)
- Frederic Murray – Archdeacon of Belize (1907–1918)
- Kate Peacock – Archdeacon of Stansted (2023–)
- Andrew Ritchie – Archdeacon of Surrey (1949–1955)
- Morris Rodham – Archdeacon of Warwick (2010–2019)
- Richard Ross-Lewin – Archdeacon of Limerick (1919–1921)
- Edward Leslie Seager – Archdeacon of Dorset (1955–1974)
- Andrew Spens – Archdeacon of Lahore (1892–1900)
- Basil Stratton – Archdeacon of Lichfield (1959–1974)
- Tony Wilds – Archdeacon of Plymouth (2001–2010)
- David Williams – Archdeacon of Cardigan (1928–1936)

==== Other clergy ====
- Francis ffolkes, 5th Baronet – chaplain to Queen Victoria, King Edward VIII, King George V, and King George VI
- Claude Hinscliff – noted suffragist and founder of the Church League for Women's Suffrage
- Jonas Pilling – grossly incompetent vicar of St Mark's Church, Huddersfield
- James Sunter – rector of St Paul's Church, Adelaide (1890–1909)
- Percy Warrington – clergyman founder of the Allied Schools financial trust

== Sport ==
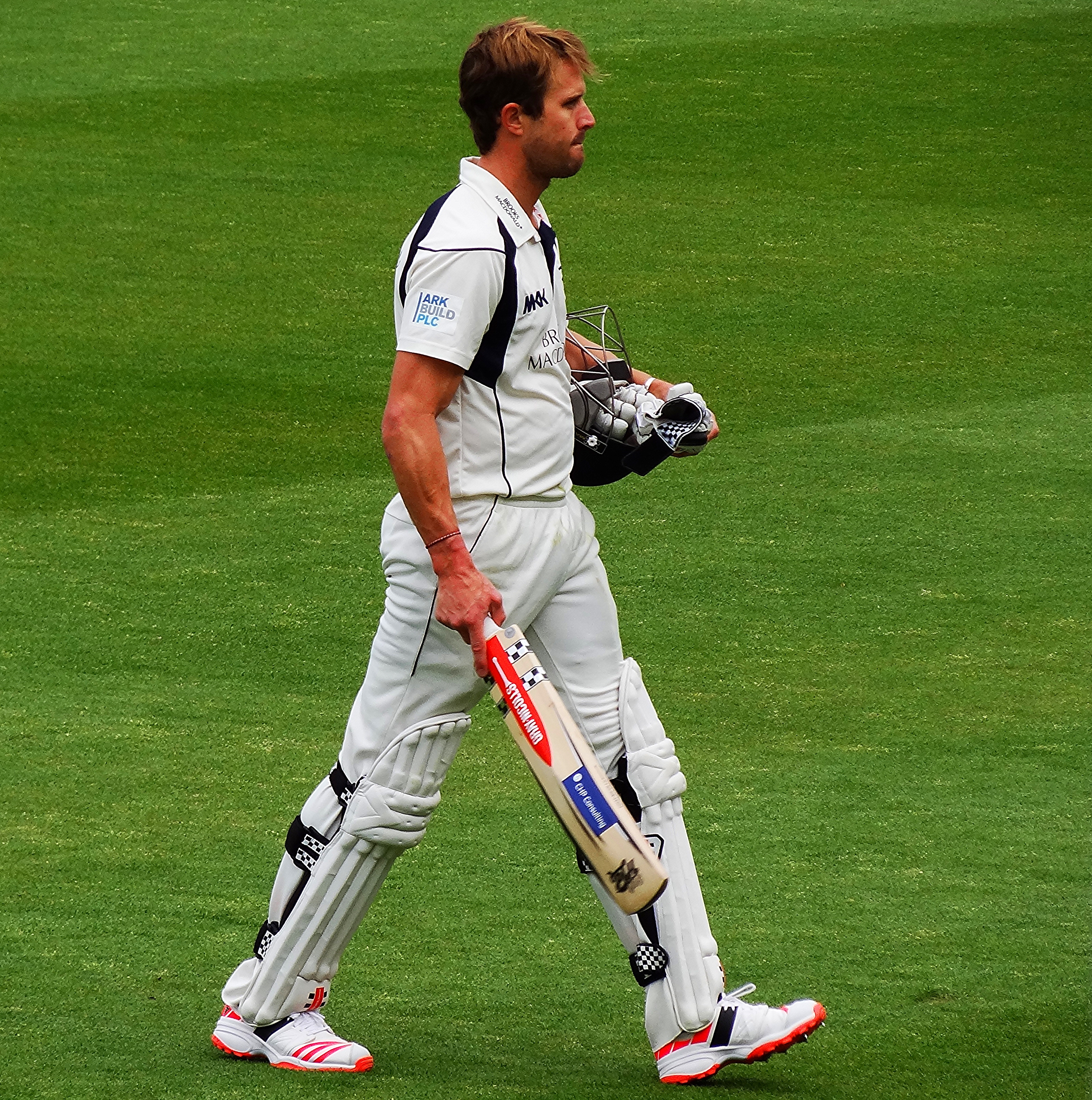
Nick Compton

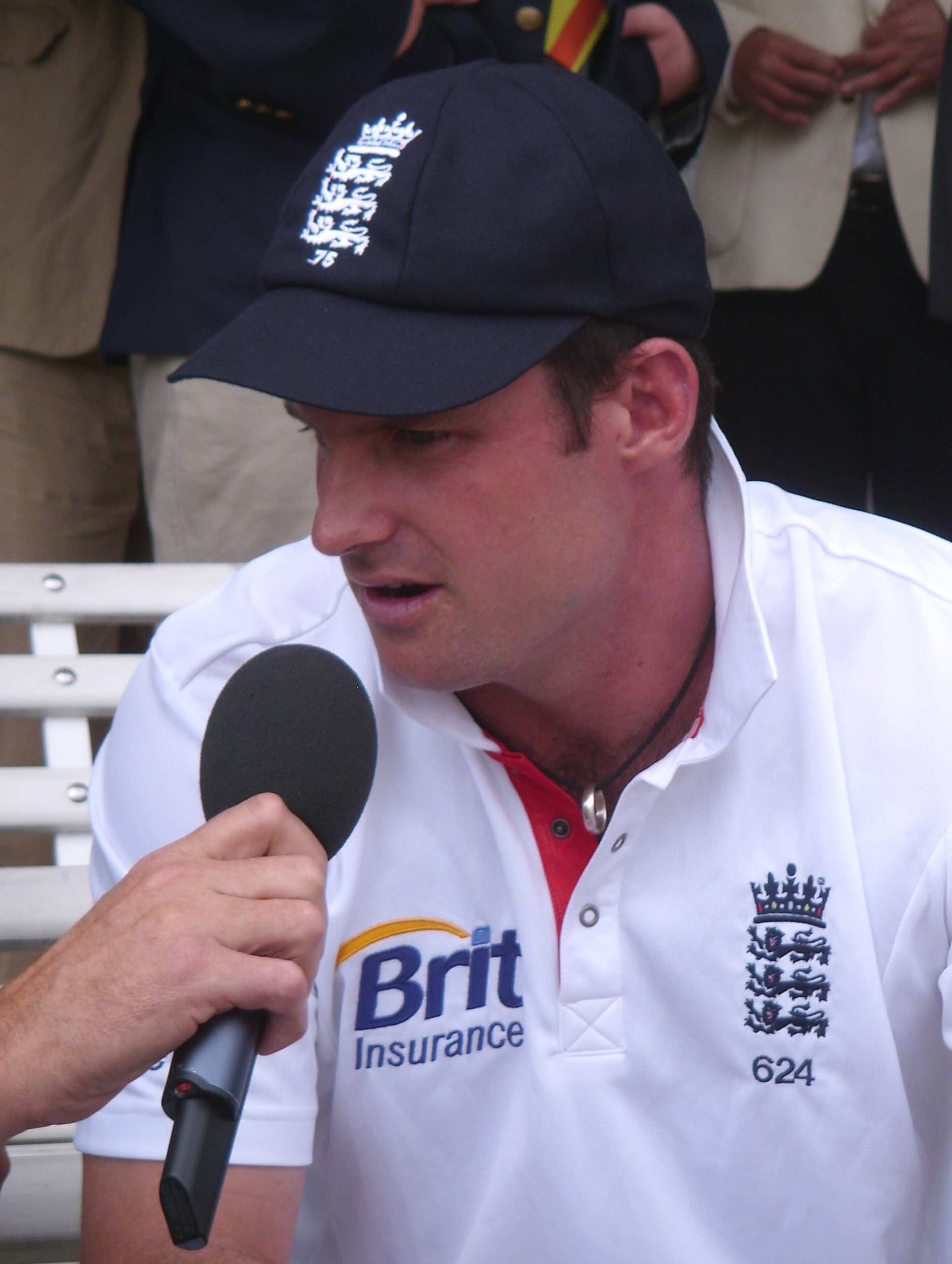
Andrew Strauss

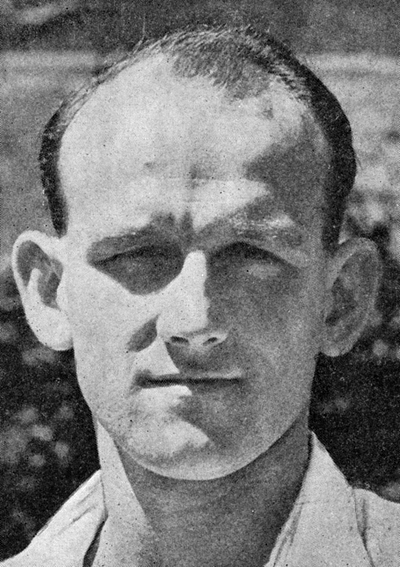
Frank Tyson

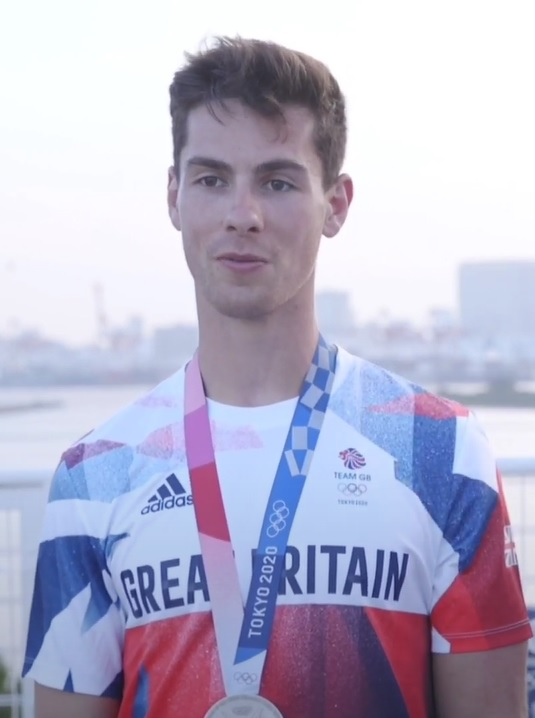
Angus Groom

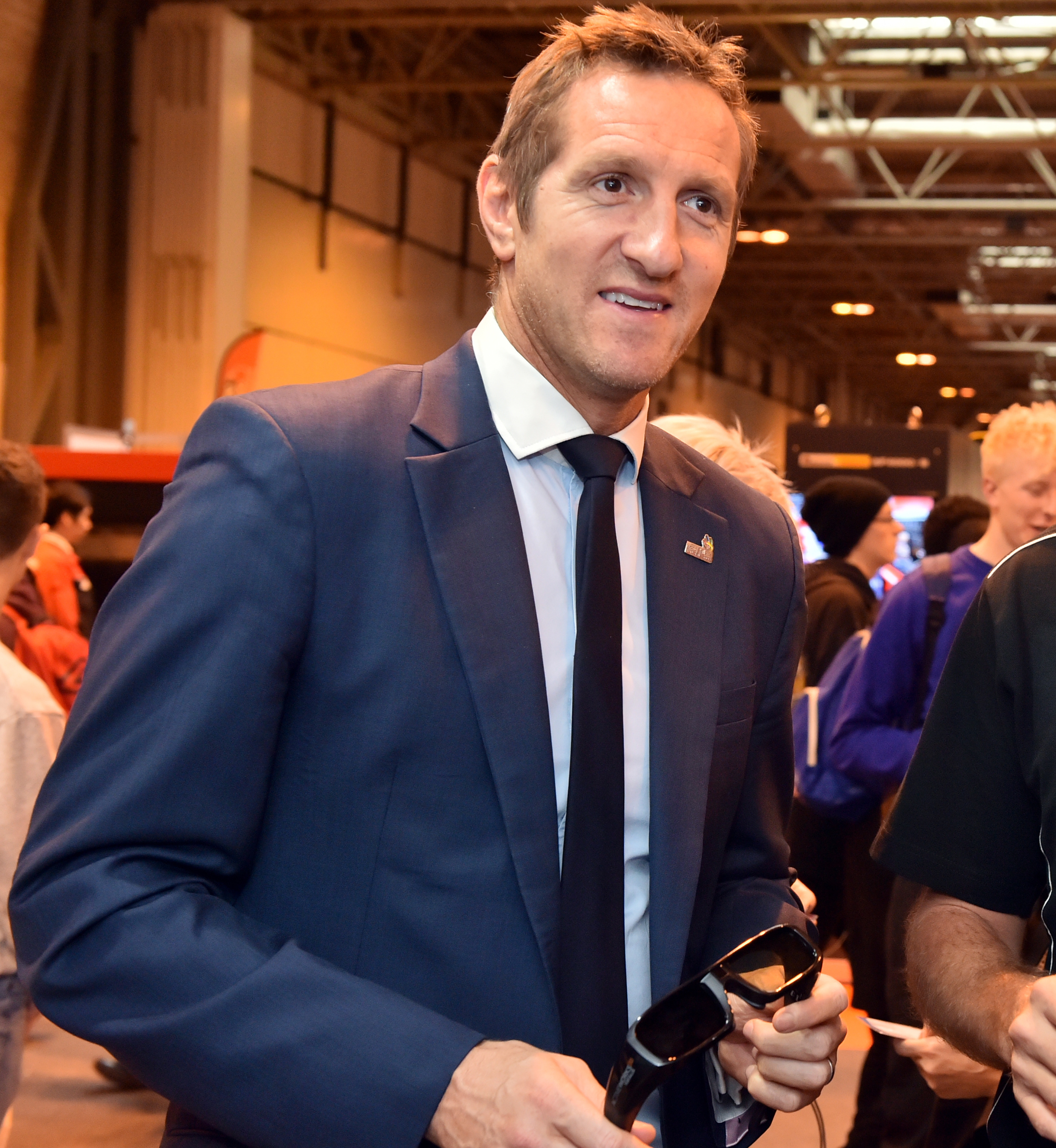
Will Greenwood

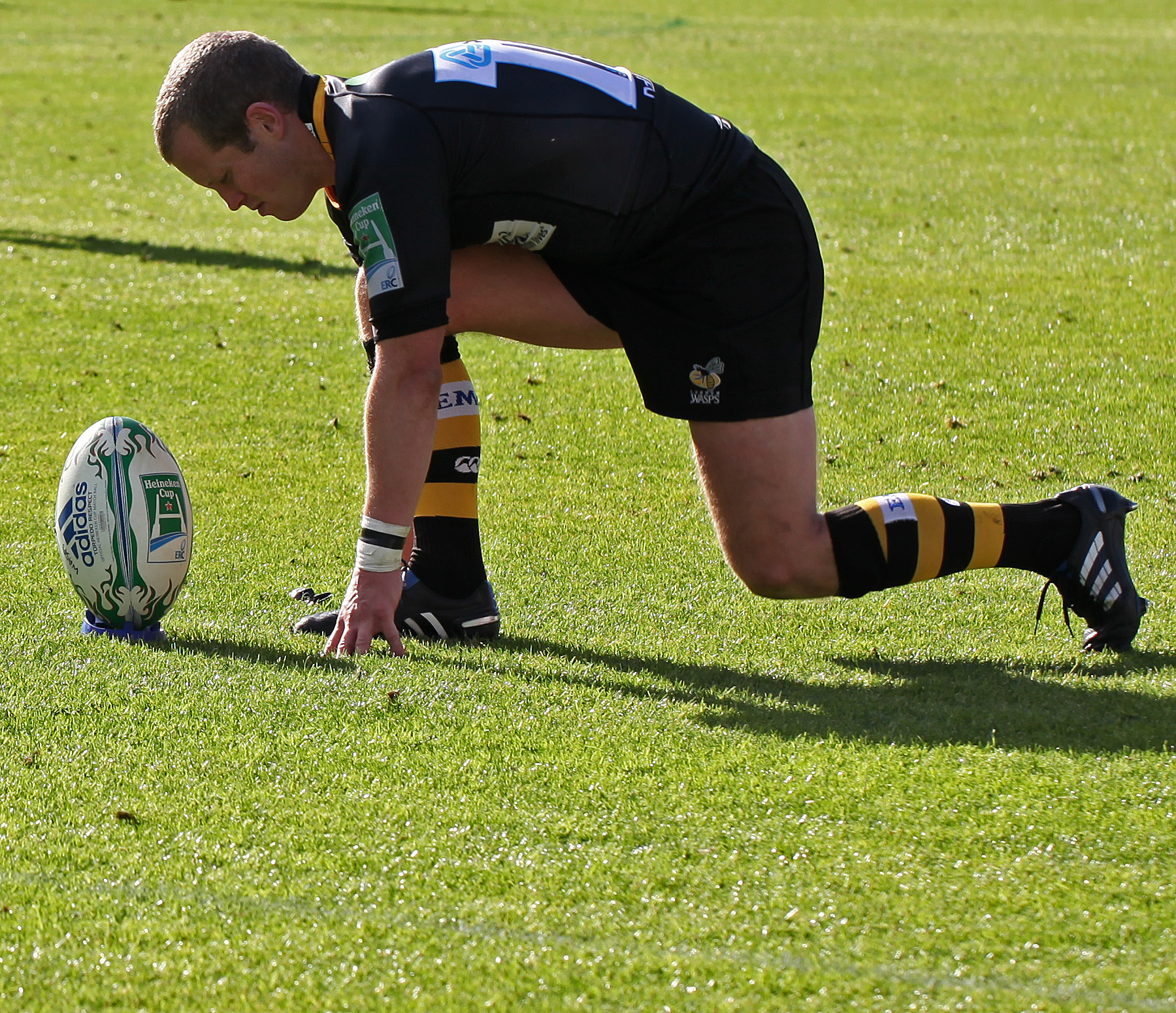
Dave Walder

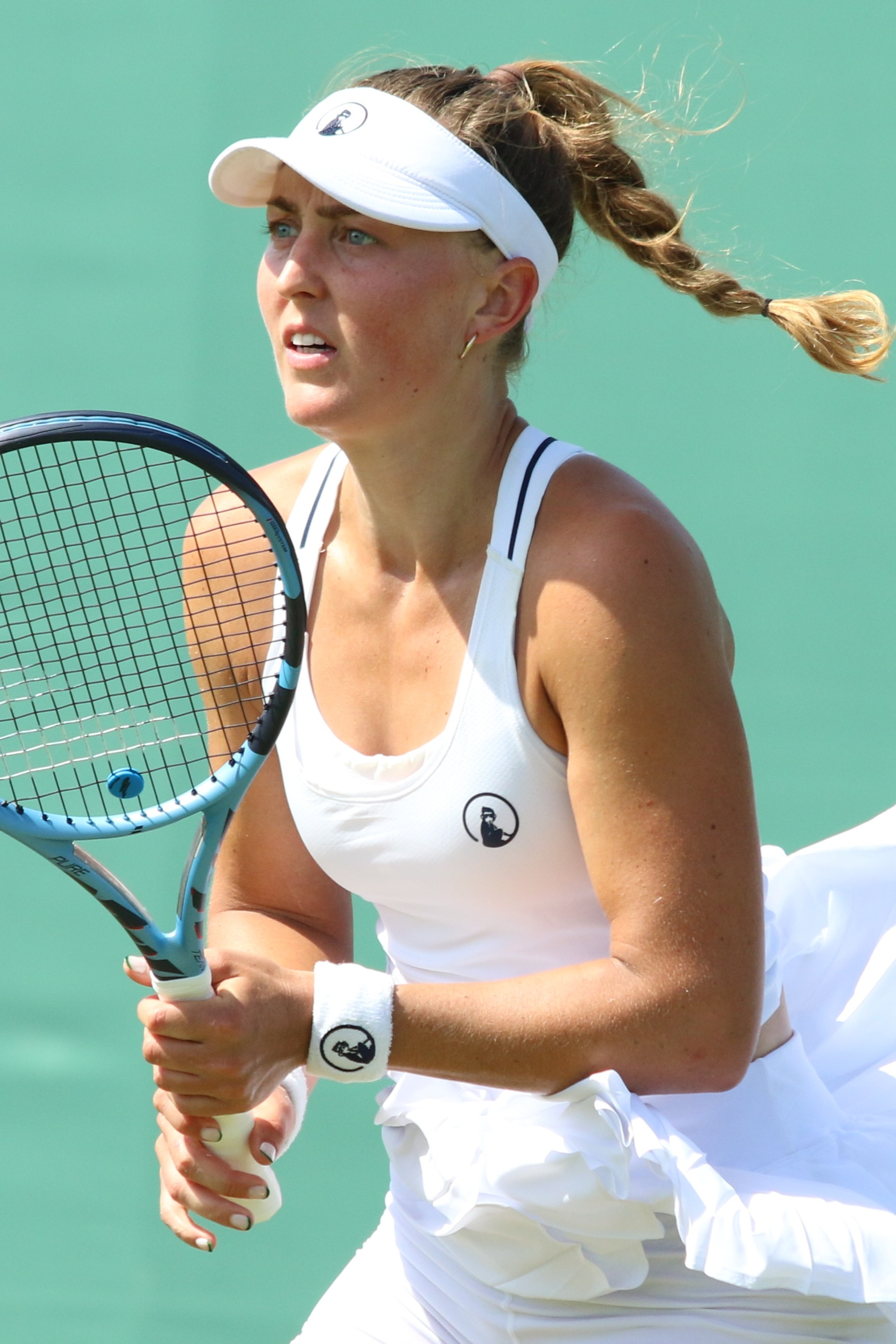
Gabriela Knutson

=== Athletics ===
- Mark Hudspith – long-distance runner; bronze medallist in the Marathon at the 1994 Commonwealth Games
- Jon Solly – gold medallist in the 10,000 metres at the 1986 Commonwealth Games

=== Cricket ===
- Chaitanya Bishnoi – Haryana (2015–2023) and Chennai Super Kings (2018–2019)
- Thomas Bruce – Durham UCCE (2005)
- Nick Compton – Middlesex (2001–2009), Somerset (2010–2014) and England (2012–2016)
- Graham Cowdrey – Kent (1984–1998)
- Tim Curtis – Cambridge University (1983) and Worcestershire (1979–1997)
- Peter Deakin – Cambridge University (1996) and Dorset (1999–2006)
- Rodney Dethridge – Bedfordshire (1982)
- Paul Dixey – Kent (2005–2010), Durham UCCE (2007–2010) and Leicestershire (2011–2012)
- Edwin Hardy – Europeans (1915)
- George Harper – Durham UCCE (2009–2010) and Buckinghamshire (2008–2012)
- Steve Henderson – Worcestershire (1977–1981), Cambridge University (1982–1983) and Glamorgan (1983–1985)
- Thomas Jameson – Cambridge University (1970) and Warwickshire (1970)
- James Lawrence – Durham University (1995) and British Universities (1998)
- Harry McInley – Durham MCCU (2015)
- Gavin Moffat – Cambridge University (1996)
- James Moyes – Cumberland (1994–2001) and Cambridge University (2002)
- Kim Norkett – Glamorgan (1974)
- James Rowe – Durham UCCE (2001) and Kent Cricket Board (2002)
- Andrew Strauss – Middlesex (1998–2012) and England (2003–2012)
- Frank Tyson – Northamptonshire (1952–1960) and England (1954–1959)
- Freddie van den Bergh – Surrey (2011–2019) and Durham MCCU (2012–2014)
- Charlie Wallis – Durham MCCU (2012–2013)
- Nathaniel Watkins – Oxfordshire (2011), Durham MCCU (2011–2013) and Jersey (2012–2019)
- James Wilkes-Green – Guernsey (2015)
- Michael Yeabsley – Cambridge University (1995)

=== Cycling ===
- Katharine Ford – ultra-distance cyclist; 4 time world record holder on the Indoor Track

=== Field Hockey ===
- Gavin Featherstone – coached United States at 1984 Olympics and South Africa at the 1996 Olympics
- Rui Saldanha – represented Great Britain at 1972 Olympics

=== Football ===
- Warren Bradley – Manchester United (1958–1962) and England (1959)

=== Rowing ===
- Simon Barr – Gold medallist for Germany in Lightweight men's eight at the 2014 and 2015 World Championships
- Angus Groom – Silver medallist in Quadruple sculls at the 2020 Olympics
- Alice Freeman – Bronze medallist in Women's eight at 2007 World Championships, 5th in Women's eight at the 2008 Olympics
- Louisa Reeve – Bronze medallist in Women's eight at 2007 World Championships
- Emily Taylor – Silver medallist in Women's eight at 2008 European Championships

=== Rugby ===
- Toby Allchurch – England (1979)
- Josh Basham – Newcastle Falcons (2018–2022)
- Beth Blacklock – Scotland women (2023–2025)
- Richard Breakey – Scotland (1978)
- Jeremy Campbell-Lamerton – Scotland (1986–1987)
- Will Carling – England (1988–1997)
- Will Greenwood – England (1997–2004)
- Mark Griffin – United States (2003–2005)
- Charlie Hannaford – England (1971)
- Fitz Harding – Bristol Bears (2020–)
- Stuart Legg – Newcastle Falcons (1997–2000)
- Peter Lillington – Scotland B (1981–1982)
- Andy Mullins – England B (1988) and England (1989)
- Marcus Rose – England (1981–1987)
- Roshini Turner – Hong Kong women (2019–)
- Dave Walder – England (2001–2003)
- Peter Warfield – England (1973–1975)
- Ben Woods – England Saxons (2006–2012)

=== Tennis ===
- Gabriela Knutson – Czech tennis player; career-high singles ranking of 155

== Miscellaneous ==
- Matthew Hedges – doctoral student imprisoned for spying by the United Arab Emirates
- Jolyon Maugham – barrister and founder of Good Law Project
- Nigel Morgan – security consultant who gained notoriety for leaking the 2004 Equatorial Guinea coup attempt
- Frederick William Sanderson – Headmaster of Oundle School (1892–1922)
