= Arculus =

Arculus may refer to:

- The Roman tutelary god of chests and strongboxes (arcae); see Indigitamenta
- A crossvein near the base of the wing in certain insects; see Glossary of entomology terms
- Arculus (bivalve), a genus of the Neoleptonidae family of marine bivalve clams

== People with the surname ==
- Sir David Arculus (born 1946), British media figure, businessman and advisor to Government
- Richard Arculus, Australian petrologist and volcanologist
- Sir Ronald Arculus (1923–2016), British ambassador

== See also ==
- Aculus, a genus of mites
- Argulus, a genus of fish lice
