= Babu Varghese =

Indian travel ambassador

Babu Varghese (28 January 1951, Kerala, India – 18 October 2011) helped to make the South Indian state of Kerala, and in particular the image of houseboats on the Kerala backwaters, a notable tourist destination.

== Life ==
Varghese took a master's degree in zoology and behavioral science. His personal interest was in the nature of Kerala.

== Tourism in Kerala ==
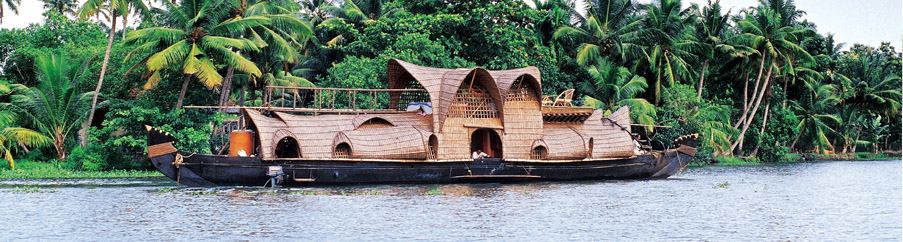
A Kettuvallam houseboat in Kerala, India

Varghese's most important contribution to the field of tourism in Kerala is perhaps the conversion of the traditional Kettuvallam rice boat into a touring and cruising houseboat. This helped to rescue the then declining industry of boating, boat building and artisans working with bamboo. To date (2017) there are more than three thousand tour boats that ply the backwaters of Kerala. The popular symbol of Kerala is a houseboat mainly because of Varghese.

His research on back water tourism started early eighties with an elaborate study on the navigable canals from Varkala through Ernakulam. He met revenue officers from five central Kerala districts to collect the litho maps of the regions. Made many voyages through these canals during low and high tides to decide the height of the proposed House boats to pass under the numerous bridges en route.

He met Mannasseril Padmanabhan from Alumkadav, near to Karunagappally, a doyan carpenter who excelled in country boat making. Both burned the midnight oil to design the modern house boat. It was a long cherished dream came true.

Babu Varghese is detailed in the travelogue Chasing the Monsoon written by Alexander Frater, the Travel Correspondent of The Observer, London. Varghese introduced Tree-houses into Kerala tourism by co-opting the help of local tribes and using their expertise. Converted Eru-madoms, traditional tribal treetop dwellings such as at Wayanad, have become tourist destinations.

Varghese also helped give the Tiger Trail project a new direction and market.

== Bibliography ==
- Frater, Alexander (1991). Chasing the Monsoon (1st American ed.). New York: Knopf. ISBN 0394583108. OCLC 23255057.
