= David Chellappa =

Anglican bishop

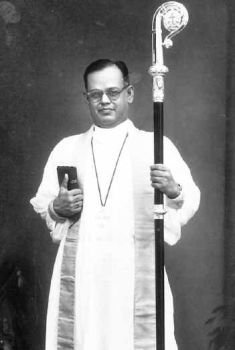
Bishop David Chellappa

The Rt Rev David Chellappa (1905–1964) was an Indian Anglican priest. He was the first Indian to become the Bishop of Madras in 1955.

== Early life and education ==
He was born in Tanjore, Madras Presidency in 1905. He completed his schooling from St John's High School, Palayamkotta and Bishop Cotton Boys' School, Bangalore. He studied English literature at Madras Christian College and theology at St Augustine's college in Canterbury. Chellappa received a Master of Arts degree from Durham University in 1954.

== Ministry ==
Rev. David Chellappa was ordained in 1933 by Rt Rev Edward Harry Mansfield Waller and was sent to Tiruchirappalli district to serve two churches - Mettupatti and Irungalur. He was the first Indian pastor of the St.Thomas English Church in SanThome, Madras. He also served as the first Indian principal of St. Paul's High School, Vepery, Madras in 1937. Following his return from Durham University, he was elected and consecrated as the first Indian bishop of the Diocese of Madras in 1955 succeeding Rt Rev Edward Waller. He acted as the Interim bishop of Trichy Tanjore CSI Diocese from 1962 till 7 February 1964. The Hope College, Holland, Michigan, conferred an honorary Doctor of Divinity [D.D] degree on Chellappa.

He was also the editor of the South India Churchman.

He died on 25 August 1964.

Anglican Communion titles
Preceded by Edward Waller	Bishop of Madras; 1955 – 1964	Succeeded by Lesslie Newbigin
