= St. Paul's Higher Secondary School, Vepery =

St. Paul's Higher Secondary School

Location
- 11, Church Road, Vepery; Chennai, Tamil Nadu, 600007; India

Information
- Founded: 1716; 310 years ago

St. Paul's Higher Secondary School is a school in Vepery, Chennai, Tamil Nadu, India.

The school, founded in 1716, was initially meant for students from an underprivileged background and at present, it has students from varied social backgrounds in Classes V to XII from both the Tamil and English medium streams.
