= Maurice Whitehead =

British historian

Maurice Whitehead MBE FRHistS (born 1952) is a British archivist and historian of religion, currently Director of Heritage Collections and Schwarzenbach Research Fellow at the Venerable English College in Rome.

== Early life and education ==
Whitehead graduated from Durham University in 1975 with a degree in French. He qualified as a teacher at the University of Cambridge, and taught at Wimbledon College from 1976 until 1987. In 1984, he completed his doctorate in educational history at the University of Hull.

== Academic career ==
Whitehead was appointed to a lectureship in Education at the University of Hull in 1987, and promoted to senior lecturer in 1995. In 2000, he became Professor of Education at Swansea University, later moving to the Department of History in 2004 following the closure of the Department of Education.

In 2013, he published English Jesuit Education: Expulsion, Suppression, Survival and Restoration, 1762–1803, which received positive reviews.

He was appointed MBE in the 2025 King's Birthday Honours for services to the development of British heritage in Rome, Italy.

== Selected bibliography ==
=== Books ===
- Whitehead, Maurice (1980). Peter Newby: Eighteenth Century Lancashire Recusant Poet. Lancaster: University of Lancaster Centre for North-West Regional Studies.
- ——— (1992). Education and Europe: Historical and Contemporary Perspectives. Hull: University of Hull.
- ——— (1996). The Academies of the Reverend Bartholomew Booth in Georgian England and Revolutionary America: Enlightening the Curriculum. Lewiston, New York: Edwin Mellen Press. ISBN 9780773488564.
- ——— (2013). English Jesuit Education: Expulsion, Suppression, Survival and Restoration, 1762–1803. Farnham: Ashgate. ISBN 9781409448822.

=== As editor ===
- Hartley, David; Whitehead, Maurice, eds. (2005). Teacher Education: Major Themes in Education. London: Routledge. ISBN 9780415324229.
- Whitehead, Maurice, ed. (2008). Held in Trust: 2008 Years of Sacred Culture. Stonyhurst: St Omers Press. ISBN 9780955359231.
- ———, ed. (2020). Memory, Martyrs, and Mission: Essays to Commemorate the 850th Anniversary of the Martyrdom of St Thomas Becket (c. 1118–1170). Rome: Gangemi Editore. ISBN 9788849240078.
