= Mark Reginald Hull =

British archaeologist and museum curator

- Born: 1897; Northumberland
- Died: 14 November 1976 (aged 78–79)
- Education: University of Durham
- Known for: Excavations at Colchester
- Awards: FSA FMA
- Scientific career
- Fields: Archaeology

Mark Reginald ‘Rex’ Hull FSA FMA (1897 – 14 November 1976) was a British archaeologist and museum curator.

He is most notable for his excavation work at Colchester and his corpus of Romano-British brooches.

== Early life ==
Hull was born in Northumberland, the son of 'a vigorously learned incumbent of Belford'. During the First World War he served as an officer in the Northumberland Fusiliers. He subsequently studied at Durham University under F. G. Simpson, and graduated with a Bachelor of Arts in 1922. He collaborated with Simpson at the 1925 excavation of the Roman fort of Great Chesters (Aesica) on Hadrian’s Wall.

== Colchester and Essex Museum ==
In 1926 he was appointed curator of the Colchester and Essex Museum which occupied part of Colchester Castle. Hull persuaded The Ministry of Works to consolidate the Castle structure and fully roof it, enabling the museum to expand.

Hull also organised archaeological excavations around Colchester. Hull and Christopher Hawkes carried out one of Britain’s first major rescue excavations on the Colchester by-pass in 1930. This included the Iron Age and Roman site at Sheepen which was excavated between 1930 and 1939.

During the Second World War Hull served in the Observer Corps. After the war he continued directing rescue excavations as Colchester was redeveloped. When St Nicholas Colchester was declared redundant and demolished, he conducted a rescue excavation on the site in difficult circumstances.

Hull published three research reports for the Society of Antiquaries on excavations at Colchester. Camulodunum (1947), in collaboration with Christopher Hawkes; Roman Colchester (1958); and The Roman potters' kilns of Colchester (1963).

== Retirement ==
After his retirement in 1962 Hull worked on his corpus of Romano-British brooches for which he toured the museums of Britain, drawing almost 10,000 brooches. The corpus was unpublished at his death. The typescript and bibliography were deposited with the Society of Antiquaries but the part covering pre-Roman bow brooches was published in 1987 by Christopher Hawkes who revised and added to the corpus.

== Select publications ==
- Hawkes, F.C.; Hull, M.R. (1947). Camulodunum: first report on the excavations at Colchester, 1930–1939. Society of Antiquaries of London. ISBN 978-0-85431-197-2.
- Hull, M.R. (1958). Roman Colchester. Society of Antiquaries of London.
- Hull, M.R. (1963). The Roman Potters’ Kilns of Colchester. Society of Antiquaries of London.
- Hull, M. R. (1987). Corpus of Ancient Brooches in Britain. Ann Arbor, MI: University of Michigan Press. ISBN 978-0-86054-450-0.
