= Alexander Frater =

British-Australian journalist and travel writer (1937–2020)

- Born: Alexander Russell Frater; 3 January 1937; Port Vila, New Hebrides (now Vanuatu)
- Died: 1 January 2020 (aged 82)
- Education: Scotch College, Melbourne; University of Melbourne
- Occupations: Writer and journalist
- Partner: Marlis (d. 2011)
- Children: 2

Alexander Russell Frater (3 January 1937 – 1 January 2020) was a British travel writer and journalist. Described by Miles Kington as 'the funniest man who wrote for Punch since the war', Frater is best known for his various books and for documentaries he wrote and produced for the BBC and ABC.

== Early life and education ==
Frater was born in a small mission hospital in Port Vila, Vanuatu, in the middle of a monsoon. His doctor father would later teach him how to observe and analyse weather. A native gardener employed by his family believed the young Alexander was the reincarnation of a rain God. A few weeks after the attack on Pearl Harbor, the family evacuated to Australia to escape the coming war. In 1946 they moved to Suva, Fiji, where Frater Sr. became professor at the Central Medical School.

After primary school Frater was sent back to Australia to attend Scotch College in Melbourne, where he edited the school magazine and, as head boy, succeeded in his campaign to abolish corporal punishment. Initially studying law at the University of Melbourne, he left before graduating to move to England, and studied English at Durham University. From 1960 to 1962 Frater competed for Durham University Boat Club. He also served as Captain of the Hatfield College Swimming Club in 1961.

By his own account, he stumbled into a journalism career by accident. Having submitted pieces to Punch as an undergraduate at Durham he was, against all expectations, eventually offered a staff job, which prompted him to again leave university without graduating. Frater would later enroll at Perugia University to briefly study Italian, before again dropping out, meaning that he had attended three universities without graduating from any of them – an 'unusual feat' of which he was proud. While in Italy he met his wife, Marlis Pfund, who worked as an air hostess for Swissair.

== Career ==
=== Early career ===
Before making his living through writing Frater had romanticised about joining the Colonial Service, but the process of decolonization, culminating in the end of the Colonial Office altogether, ended this notion. Frater's tenure at Punch saw him develop a friendly rivalry with a young Alan Coren, later to find fame as a humourist and participant on The News Quiz. But it also coincided with the magazine's period of starkest decline, which he attributed to both the Satire boom (which left Punch looking old-fashioned) and the decline of the British Empire – the magazine being popular in the Colonies.

Looking to move on, he soon became a contracted writer for The New Yorker. During his time writing for The New Yorker he produced a number of stories about an idyllic, imaginary Pacific island he called Tofua. Later he was informed by a fact-checker that such an island really existed in Tonga, which went on to form the basis for a book published many years later, Tales from the Torrid Zone. Following his time with The New Yorker he spent one year as a staff writer for The Daily Telegraph from 1966 to 1967, working on its supplemental magazine. John Anstey, the magazine's editor, did not like 'Russ', the name which Frater was then known by and demanded he use his first name for his byline (his family had a tradition of calling members by their second names). Friends from earlier periods would continue to call him 'Russ', as did those he met after leaving Fleet Street.

=== The Observer ===
Frater moved to The Observer in 1967, where he would spend more than two decades, become travel editor and amass a series of awards. He was twice commended in the British Press Awards, and in 1990 won Travel Writer of the Year.

Frater took a short break from journalism to write Beyond the Blue Horizon (1984). He attempted to recreate the journey made in the Imperial Airways 'Eastbound Empire' service - the world's longest and most adventurous scheduled air route. Chasing the Monsoon (1990) sees Frater follow the Monsoon in India. As a child his curiosity about India, and particularly its monsoon season, was sparked by his father - who often told stories about the country. In the course of this journey following the Monsoon he visited the city of Deeg, having driven for five-hours from New Delhi, but was disappointed to find the city largely lifeless and the watercourses all empty. Chasing the Monsoon would turn out to be Frater's most popular book, particularly in India, where, by 2016, it still sold hundreds of copies a month.

Frater visited North Korea in the 1990s under the guise of being a teacher – journalists not being allowed in. He stayed at the Koryo Hotel, where he was one of only 20 guests despite the building having 45 floors.

In 2008 he published his final book, The Balloon Factory. It focuses on the pioneers of aviation-based at The Balloon Factory in Farnborough.

== Television ==
Frater made several television documentaries.

A BBC and ABC Discovery Series documentary recreating Africa's flying boat journeys from Cairo to Mozambique was filmed in difficult conditions in 1989 aboard a Catalina flying boat. The programme aired in 1990 entitled The Last African Flying Boat and was awarded a BAFTA for Best Documentary in 1991.

Monsoon (BBC), about India's monsoonal rainfall event, aired in 1991.

In the Footsteps of Buddha (BBC), 1993.

== Personal ==
Frater had 2 children: Tania, a university administrator, and John, a medical professor at the University of Oxford. He lived in Richmond upon Thames, close to Heathrow Airport, but unlike many residents did not mind being under 'the glide path' and was curious about the details of the aircraft passing above his flat.

In a 2004 interview with The Independent Frater named his worst travel experience as being arrested in Kupang, West Timor by the Indonesian Military and spending three days in prison, in a cell neighbouring a pit with two Komodo dragons. After release he was put under house arrest and then thrown off the island.

== Death ==
Frater died on 1 January 2020 at the age of 82.

== Bibliography ==
- Frater, A.R. (1983). Stopping-Train Britain. London: Hodder & Stoughton. ISBN 978-0340324516.
- ——— (1984). Great Rivers of the World. London: Hodder & Stoughton. ISBN 978-0008383381.
- ——— (1986). Beyond the Blue Horizon: On the Track of Imperial Airways. New York: Scribner. ISBN 978-0684188379.
- ——— (1990). Chasing the Monsoon: A Modern Pilgrimage Through India. London: Picador. ISBN 978-0670819430.
- ——— (2004). Tales from the Torrid Zone. London: Vintage Books / Picador. ISBN 978-0330375290.
- ——— (2008). The Balloon Factory: The Story of the Men Who Built Britain's First Flying Machines. London: Picador. ISBN 978-0330433105.

== Awards ==
- BAFTA Award for Best Single Documentary (The Last African Flying Boat)
- British Press Travel Award commendations – 1982 and 1989
- British Press Award Travel Writer of the Year – 1990, 1991 and 1992
- Best Radio Feature Travelex Travel Writers' Awards – 2000
- Overall winner Travelex Travel Writers' Awards – 2000
- Shortlisted Thomas Cook Travel Book of the Year Award, for Monsoon (Br Book Award, McVitie's Prize)

== See also ==
- List of alumni of Hatfield College, Durham
- List of Durham University people
