= Leslie Weatherhead (priest) =

English Anglican priest

Personal details
- Born: 1914
- Died: 2011 (aged 96–97)
- Denomination: Anglican

Thomas Leslie Weatherhead (1914–2011) was an English Anglican priest. He was dean of Nassau, Bahamas, from 1965 to 1972.

Weatherhead was educated at Hatfield College, Durham, and ordained in 1938. After curacies in Beeston Hill and Leyburn he was a chaplain in the RAFVR from 1942 to 1947. When peace returned he served incumbencies at Halton, New Mills and Staveley, Derbyshire before his time as dean of Felmingham and Banningham afterwards.
