= Philip Ogden =

British geographer (born 1949)

Philip Ogden FAcSS
- Born: 1949 (age 76–77)

Academic background
- Education: Durham University (BA); Nuffield College, Oxford (DPhil)

Academic work
- Discipline: Population geography
- Institutions: Queen Mary University of London

Philip Ernest Ogden (born 1949) is an English geographer, specialising in population geography.

He is emeritus professor of geography at Queen Mary University of London (QMUL), where he also held a number of senior administrative positions.

== Early life and education ==
Ogden graduated from Durham University with a first-class degree in geography in 1970. He received his DPhil from Nuffield College, Oxford in 1975.

== Career and research ==
Ogden spent the bulk of his academic career at Queen Mary, becoming professor of geography and serving as head of the Department of Geography from 1992 to 1996. He was vice-principal for humanities and social sciences from 1998 to 2006 and senior vice-principal from 2005 until 2011. He also served as acting principal of Queen Mary in 2009.

Ogden's research has focused on population and demographic change, particularly migration, changing household structures and urban populations in Britain, France and other parts of Europe. He has also examined migration between the French Caribbean and metropolitan France, as well as demographic change in London's Docklands.

Ogden was elected an Academician of the Academy of Social Sciences in 2009.

The annual lecture jointly organised by Queen Mary and the University of London Institute in Paris was renamed the Philip Ogden Paris Lecture in 2019, recognising his role in developing the partnership between the two institutions.

== Personal life ==
In 2009, Ogden was made a Freeman of the City of London, and in 2012 he joined the livery of the Worshipful Company of Drapers. He served as Master of the company in 2018–19.
