= Stephen Pern =

English travel writer

Stephen Pern FRGS
- Born: Stephen Antony Nigel Pern; 18 August 1950 (age 76)
- Education: Durham University
- Occupations: Travel writer and documentary maker
- Writing career
- Genre: Travel literature
- Notable work: The Great Divide: A Walk Through America Along the Continental Divide (1987)
- Military career
- Allegiance: United Kingdom
- Branch: British Army
- Service years: 1974–1977
- Rank: Lieutenant
- Unit: Parachute Regiment

Stephen Antony Nigel Pern (born 18 August 1950) is an English travel writer and documentary maker noted for chronicling long-distance journeys on foot.

== Early life and education ==
Pern was brought up on a dairy farm on the outskirts of Hastings, East Sussex. He has a twin brother, Jeremy, a golf course architect.

He graduated from Durham University with a degree in geography and anthropology in 1971.

== Career ==
=== Early career and military service ===
After leaving university he worked for two years as a game preservation officer in Nigeria with Voluntary Service Overseas. In 1974 he spent six months in Colombia teaching English as a foreign language.

Later that year he joined the Parachute Regiment of the British Army on a short service commission. His appointment was gazetted with effect from 6 October 1974. He left active military service with the rank of lieutenant on 6 October 1977, transferring to the Regular Army Reserve of Officers.

=== Travel writing and television ===
While serving in the army Pern had read Journey to the Jade Sea (1964) by the explorer John Hillaby, which suggested that no one had ever walked around the entirety of Lake Turkana. He set out to be the first to do so, and "accomplished this remarkable trip" in fifty days. His account of the walk became his first book, Another Land, Another Sea (1979). His second book, The Beach of Morning (1983), is based on a 500-mile walk from the shores of Lake Chad south along the border of Nigeria and Cameroon to the Benue River in 1980.

In 1982, Pern embarked on a trek across the Continental Divide from Antelope Wells, New Mexico to Canada. The resulting book, The Great Divide (1987), has received praise from fellow hikers for being a stylistic departure from more typical backpacking literature, as the writing emphasizes self-deprecating wit and vivid character sketches rather than the emotional "journey of self" prose common to the genre. Contemporary reviews were generally positive, with critics highlighting Pern's "irreverent" observations on the Americans he encountered during his journey and interesting descriptions of local ecology.

In 1990, his long-distance walk through the mountainous spine of Japan was documented in the Granada Television film Down the Spine of Japan. Preferring to see Japan as a "total stranger", Pern deliberately avoided researching the country and as a result the documentary has an "unrehearsed" feel.

=== Later work ===
In 2012, Pern set out on a seven-month, 3,000-mile walk around Britain, visiting more than 100 bothies. During the journey he installed hooks in the shelters for walkers to hang wet clothing and equipment — having previously noticed from many years of walking that bothies often did not have enough or lacked them altogether. He documented the project in the self-produced film Hooks.

In 2021, Pern released a second self-produced walking documentary, Time on Legs, chronicling a trek around mainland Scotland, Shetland, Orkney, and the Isle of Lewis.

== Bibliography ==
- Another Land, Another Sea: Walking Round Lake Rudolph. London: Victor Gollancz. 1979. ISBN 9780575026766.
- Masked Dancers of West Africa: The Dogon. Morristown, New Jersey: Silver Burdett Press. 1983. ISBN 9780705407069.
- The Beach of Morning: A Walk in West Africa. London: Hodder & Stoughton. 1983. ISBN 9780340262368.
- The Great Divide: A Walk Through America Along the Continental Divide. London: Phoenix House. 1987. ISBN 9780460070119.
