= Mohammad Faiz Azmi =

Malaysian accountant and regulator

Yang Berbahagia Dato' (Dr.) Mohammad Faiz Azmi DSIS FCA
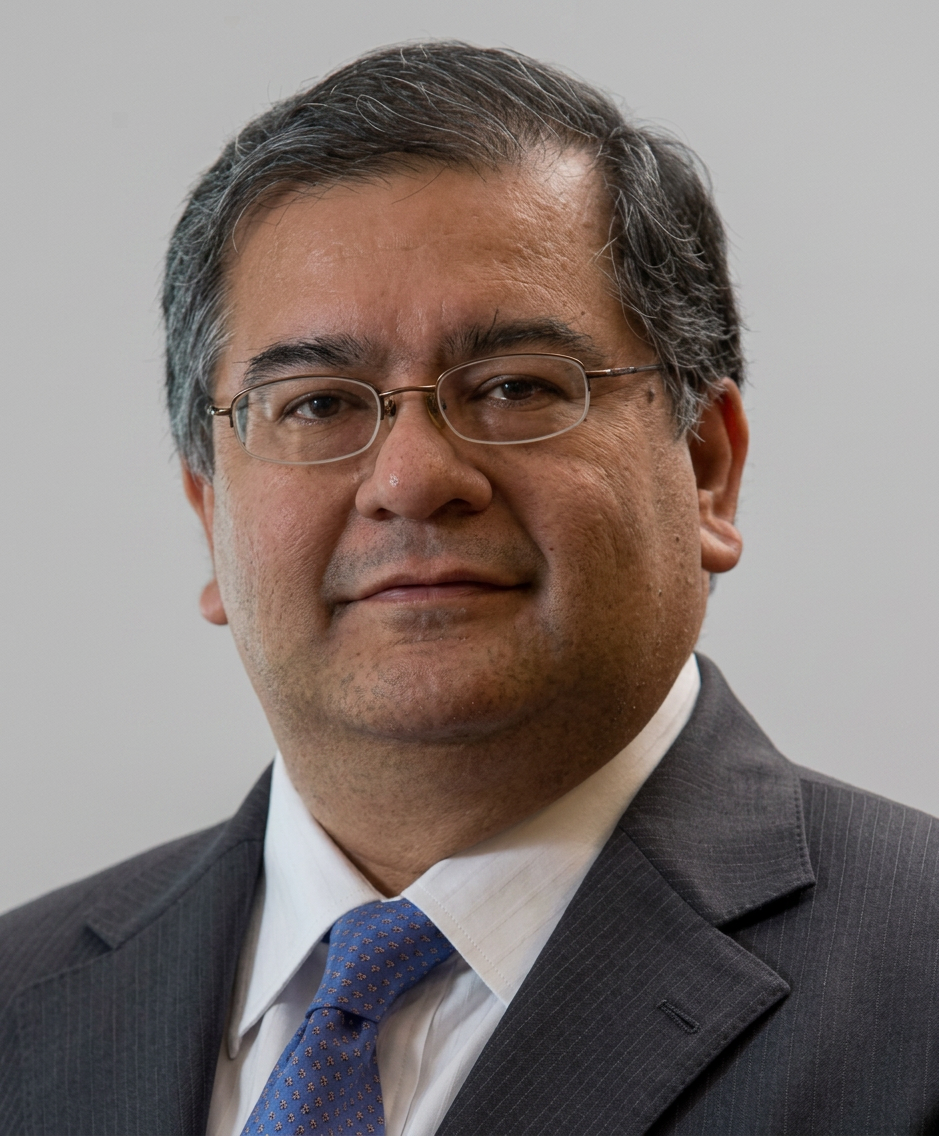
- Born: March 6, 1963 (age 63); Lambeth, London, United Kingdom
- Education: University of Durham (LLB) Lincoln's Inn (Bar) Qualified Chartered Accountant, Institute of Chartered Accountants in England and Wales
- Occupations: Accountant, Regulator
- Years active: 1985–present
- Known for: Executive Chairman of Securities Commission Malaysia; Global Islamic Finance accounting standards, furthering the accounting profession in Malaysia
- Spouse: Hon. Justice Dato' (Dr.) Faizah binti Jamaludin (m. 1992–present)
- Children: 3
- Awards: Honorary Doctorate of Law, University of Nottingham Honorary Doctorate of Civil Law, Durham University Honorary Bencher of Inner Temple

Mohammad Faiz bin Mohammad Azmi (born 6 March 1963) is a Malaysian accountant and capital markets regulator who has served as the Executive Chairman of the Securities Commission Malaysia since June 2024.

A dual-qualified barrister and chartered accountant, he is recognized for his leadership in the global adoption of International Financial Reporting Standards (IFRS) and the development of accounting frameworks for Islamic finance.

== Early life and education ==
Faiz was born in London and attended Malay College Kuala Kangsar prior to attending Taunton School in the United Kingdom.

He read law at the University of Durham, graduating in 1984 before being called to the bar at Lincoln's Inn the following year.

He subsequently qualified as a Chartered Accountant with the Institute of Chartered Accountants in England and Wales (ICAEW).

== Career ==
Faiz's first job was as a trainee accountant in Touché Ross & Co, London. He trained in the audit group until he qualified as a Chartered Accountant in 1989. He then moved to the Financial Institutions Group which covered Financial Services in audit and advisory work. Among the senior partners he worked with at Touché Ross & Co was Brian Smouha, the liquidator of Bank of Credit and Commerce International (BCCI). Faiz was involved in the investigation and running of BCCI in liquidation under Brian Smouha's supervision.

=== PricewaterhouseCoopers (PwC) ===
Faiz spent almost four decades in audit and business advisory services, serving as a partner at PwC Malaysia from 1996 and was appointed executive chairman in 2012, a role he held until his retirement in 2023.

During his tenure, he led PwC’s Global Islamic Finance Team (2007–2012) and was PwC Malaysia's Financial Services Leader and joint Head of Audit. He also led the ESG and Shariah Investing teams as part of PwC Malaysia's Sustainability and Climate Change practice in Malaysia.

During his tenure as executive chairman, Faiz also oversaw and managed significant Malaysian national projects, including the transition of the Malaysian government to accrual-based accounting, acting as an administrator for an airline and certain government entities, and he was also part of the Federal Government National COVID-19 vaccine rollout.

=== Regulatory and standard setting roles ===
- Securities Commission Malaysia: Appointed Executive Chairman in June 2024 after serving as a board member since 2023.
- International Accounting Standards Board (IASB): Chaired the Islamic Finance Consultative Group in London (2016–2022), focusing on the application of International Financial Reporting Standards (IFRS) to Sharia-compliant transactions. Led the adoption of IFRS into Malaysia in 2012.
- Malaysian Accounting Standards Board (MASB): Served as Chairman from 2009 to 2015, overseeing Malaysia’s full adoption of IFRS in 2012. Set up the Association of Asia Oceania Standard Setters Group (“AOSSG”) as its founding Chairman to help provide feedback to IASB on implementation issues.
- Malaysian Institute of Accountants (MIA): Served as President from 2015 to 2017.

== Bilateral relations and public service ==
Faiz has held prominent roles in strengthening ties between Malaysia and the United Kingdom:

- Kuala Lumpur Business Club (KLBC): As President (2018–2023), he facilitated numerous high-level engagements between Malaysian corporate leaders and UK government officials.
- Professional Advocacy: He was appointed Council Member of the ICAEW in London in 2019 and was appointed Chairman of the ICAEW Malaysian Advisory Group in 2025. Faiz also served as the first Chairman of the Malaysia Professional Accounting Centre (MyPAC) until June 2024, which is a government funded private company dedicated to provide local accountants with professional training and development via courses based on UK accountancy standards.

== Honours ==
=== Honours of Malaysia ===
- Selangor
  - Knight Companion of the Order of Sultan Sharafuddin Idris Shah (DSIS) – Dato' (2013)

Honorary Degrees

- Honorary Doctorate of Laws, University of Nottingham, United Kingdom (2016)
- Honorary Doctorate of Civil Law, University of Durham, United Kingdom (2025)

Others

- Honorary Bencher of the Honourable Society of the Inner Temple, London, United Kingdom (2025)
