= Paul du Gay =

British sociologist

- Born: Paul Lawrence John du Gay

Academic background
- Education: Durham University; Open University (PhD)
- Thesis: Work-based subjectivity and identity: assisted self-service in contemporary British retailing (1992)
- Doctoral advisor: Graeme Salaman and John Allen

Academic work
- Discipline: Sociology
- Sub-discipline: Organizational theory Public administration Cultural studies
- Institutions: Copenhagen Business School; Royal Holloway, University of London; Open University

Paul Lawrence John du Gay is a British sociologist and organisational theorist. He is a professor in the Department of Organization at Copenhagen Business School.

His main research concerns bureaucracy, organisational theory, public service and the ethics of public office.

== Early life and education ==
Du Gay studied at Durham University, where he completed a BA in General Studies in 1986 and earned his MA degree two years later. He received his PhD from the Open University in 1992.

== Academic career ==
Du Gay taught at the Open University, where he served as Vice-Dean for Research in the Faculty of Social Sciences from 1999 to 2003 and co-directed the Centre for Citizenship, Identities and Governance from 2004 to 2007. He later held academic positions at Warwick Business School, Copenhagen Business School and Royal Holloway, University of London.

At Copenhagen Business School, du Gay was academic director of the Business in Society Public–Private Platform from 2010 to 2016. At Royal Holloway, he was Director of Research in the School of Business and Management from 2017 to 2021 and Director of Research Impact from 2021 to 2024. He was seconded to the Royal Danish Defence College as Research Guest Professor during the 2021–22 academic year.

Du Gay has held visiting fellowships and professorships at institutions including the London School of Economics, Australian National University, University of Melbourne, Lund University and University of Oslo. In 2023, he became a visiting fellow of Kellogg College, Oxford.

== Research ==
Du Gay's research spans sociology, organisational studies, cultural studies and public administration. His work has particularly examined bureaucracy and formal organisation, the ethics of public office, public service, and the continuing relevance of classical organisational theory.

His early work examined consumption, identity and changing forms of employment. In 1996, he co-edited Questions of Cultural Identity with cultural theorist Stuart Hall, which included contributions from scholars including Zygmunt Bauman, Homi K. Bhabha and Lawrence Grossberg.

Du Gay is associated in particular with the study of bureaucracy and formal organisation. His books in this area include In Praise of Bureaucracy: Weber, Organization, Ethics (2000), The Values of Bureaucracy (2005), and, with Signe Vikkelsø, For Formal Organization: The Past in the Present and Future of Organization Theory (2017).

== Selected publications ==
=== Books authored ===
- du Gay, Paul (1996). Consumption and Identity at Work. London: SAGE Publications. ISBN 9780803979284.
- ——— (2000). In Praise of Bureaucracy: Weber, Organization, Ethics. London: SAGE Publications. ISBN 9780761955047.
- ——— (2007). Organizing Identity: Persons and Organizations 'After Theory'. London: SAGE Publications. ISBN 9781412911900.
- ———; Vikkelsø, Signe (2017). For Formal Organization: The Past in the Present and Future of Organization Theory. Oxford: Oxford University Press. ISBN 9780198705123.

=== Books edited ===
- Hall, Stuart; du Gay, Paul, eds. (1996). Questions of Cultural Identity. London: SAGE Publications. ISBN 9780803978836.
- du Gay, Paul, ed. (2005). The Values of Bureaucracy. Oxford: Oxford University Press. ISBN 9780199275458.
