= Herbert Edmonds =

Archdeacon of Madras (1937–1940)

Herbert James Edmonds was Archdeacon of Madras from 1937 to 1940.

Edmonds was educated at Durham University, where he was a member of Hatfield College, and Dorchester Missionary College. He was ordained deacon in 1909 and priest in 1910. He was the Principal of the SPG High School at Vepery from 1910 to 1921. Joining forces with the Eccles Establishment he served at Cannanore, Coimbatore, Coonoor, Bangalore and Ootacamund.

On his return to England he was the Vicar of Towcester then Iwerne Minster. In 1947 he became the Rural Dean of Sturminster Newton. He died on 22 December 1950.
