= Katharine Preston =

British writer and public speaker

Katherine Preston (born 16 April 1984) is a British writer and public speaker. She is the author of the memoir Out With It: How Stuttering Helped Me Find My Voice (2013), and has written for publications including The Daily Telegraph, Psychology Today and Salon.

== Life and career ==
Preston developed a speech impediment at seven years old, and attempts to correct it met with failure. She graduated from Durham University (Hatfield College) with a degree in history in 2005.

Following university, she worked for a year as a journalist but found her stuttering made her job difficult. She then became an investment writer for an asset management firm before moving to the United States, where she began researching and writing about stuttering.

Her memoir, Out With It: How Stuttering Helped Me Find My Voice, was published by Simon & Schuster in 2013.
