= Richard Ross-Lewin =

Irish Anglican priest and poet

The Ven Richard Sargint Sadler Ross-Lewin (17 August 1848 – 25 February 1922) was an Irish Anglican priest and poet. He was Archdeacon of Limerick from 1919 to 1921.

== Biography ==
Originally from County Clare, Ross-Lewin attended school in Bristol, then served as a clerk in the Royal Navy from 1864 to 1873. He studied at Hatfield Hall, Durham, earning a Bachelor of Arts degree in 1876, and took holy orders the following year. Fond of military history, he spent much of his spare time studying engagements at which Irish regiments took part, particularly if it involved either the 8th King's Royal Irish Hussars or the Connaught Rangers.

A brother, the Rev. George Harrison Ross-Lewin MA (18 December 1846 – 1 December 1913), was Hon. Canon of Durham Cathedral and a prolific writer on theological subjects.

== Career ==
Ross-Lewin was curate at Kildysart, 1877–1879; Tipperary, 1879–1883; Killoscully, 1883–1886; Rector of Kilmurry, 1886–1921; Rural Dean of Limerick, 1900; Treasurer of Limerick Cathedral, 1912–1919; and finally Archdeacon of Limerick, 1919–1921. He published two collections of poetry: West Briton, 1907; and, with his brother George, an assortment of war poems, In Britain's Need, 1917.

Though otherwise a committed Anglican, Ross-Lewin was known to take part in devotions with his neighbours. He was apparently supportive of the Anglo-Irish Treaty.

== Arms ==
Coat of arms of Richard Ross-Lewin
| Notes Confirmed 12 August 1899 by Sir Arthur Edward Vicars, Ulster King of Arms, on petition by Richard's brother George. Crest A demi-lion Sable holding between the paws a trefoil slipped Vert Escutcheon Argent a bend engrailed Sable between two trefoils slipped Vert. Motto Consilio Ad Virtute |
