= Sam Challis =

British archaeologist

Sam Challis FRAI FSA
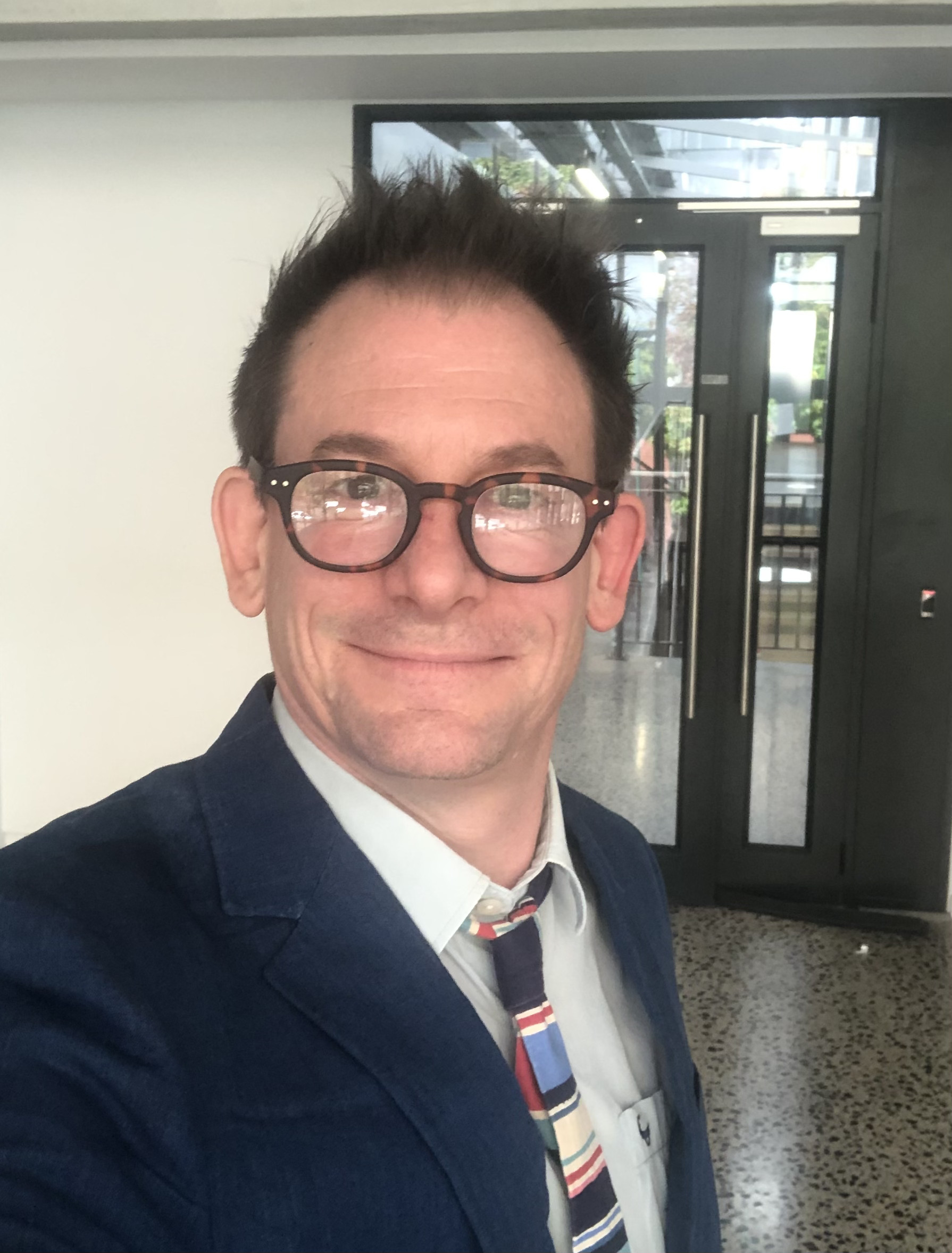
- Sam Challis (2024)
- Born: William Robert Challis; December 12, 1973 (age 52)
- Education: Durham University (BA); University of Oxford (MSt, DPhil)
- Scientific career
- Fields: Archaeology
- Workplaces: University of the Witwatersrand
- Thesis: The impact of the horse on the AmaTola ‘bushmen’: new identity in the Maloti-Drakensberg Mountains of Southern Africa (2008)
- Doctoral advisor: Peter Mitchell

William Robert (Sam) Challis (born 12 December 1973) is a British archaeologist. He is head of the Rock Art Research Institute (RARI) at the University of the Witwatersrand in Johannesburg, South Africa.

== Early life and education ==
Challis graduated with a BA in Archaeology from the University of Durham in 1996, and later earned an MSt (2003) and a DPhil at the University of Oxford (2008).

He wrote his DPhil thesis on the impact of horses on AmaTola 'bushmen' in Southern Africa.

== Career and research ==
Challis describes his main research interest as the expression of "the interaction between hunter-gatherers, pastoralists and farmers, as well as Europeans" in global rock art. He studies "both historical and modern indigenous ontologies as well as cultural creolization following contact", largely from a rock art perspective.

His research programme in the Matatiele trains locals as field technicians.

From January to April 2022, Challis was an African Fellow at the Institute for Advanced Studies in the Humanities at the University of Edinburgh. During the fellowship, he collaborated with the Scotland Rock Art Project on methods for enabling community field technicians to record and preserve rock art in the Eastern Cape.

He is also Research Affiliate of the Museum of Anthropological Archaeology at the University of Michigan, and an Honorary Research Fellow of the Department of Archaeology at the University of Aberdeen.

He co-authored Deciphering Ancient Minds: The Mystery of San Bushman Rock Art with David Lewis-Williams.

== Selected publications ==
=== Books ===
- Lewis-Williams, David; Challis, Sam (2011). Deciphering Ancient Minds: The Mystery of San Bushman Rock Art. London: Thames & Hudson. ISBN 9780500051696.
- Hampson, J.; Challis, Sam; Goldhahn, J., eds. (2022). Powerful Pictures: Rock Art Research Histories Around the World. Oxford: Archaeopress. ISBN 9781803273884.

=== Articles ===
- Challis, Sam (2012). "Creolisation on the nineteenth-century frontiers of southern Africa: a case study of the AmaTola 'Bushmen' in the Maloti-Drakensberg". Journal of Southern African Studies. 38 (2): 265–280. doi:10.1080/03057070.2012.666905.
- McGranaghan, Mark; Challis, Sam (2016). "Reconfiguring hunting magic: Southern Bushman (San) perspectives on taming and their implications for understanding rock art" (PDF). Cambridge Archaeological Journal. 26 (2): 245–269. doi:10.1017/S0959774316000408.
- Challis, Sam; Sinclair-Thomson, Brent (2022). "The Impact of Contact and Colonization on Indigenous Worldviews, Rock Art, and the History of Southern Africa: "The Disconnect"". Current Anthropology. 63 (5): 525–544. doi:10.1086/722260.
