= Richard Arculus =

Australian petrologist and volcanologist

Richard Arculus FAusIMM
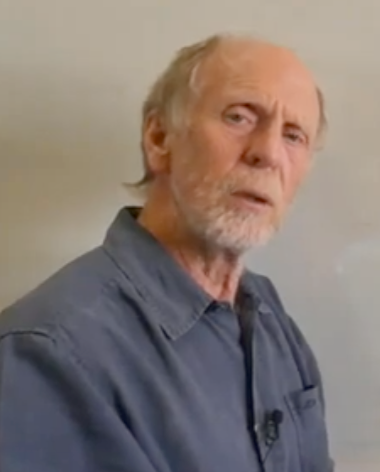
- Giving a video lecture in 2021
- Born: Richard John Arculus; 20 January 1949 (age 77)
- Education: Durham University (BSc, PhD)
- Scientific career
- Fields: Geology; Petrology; Geochemistry
- Workplaces: Australian National University
- Thesis: The alkali fasalt, andesite association of grenada, lesser antilles (1973)
- Doctoral advisor: George Malcolm Brown

Richard John Arculus (born 20 January 1949) is an Australian petrologist and volcanologist. He is Emeritus Professor of the School of Earth Sciences at the Australian National University.

His research interests and areas of expertise include inorganic geochemistry, igneous petrology, metamorphic petrology, volcanology, and chemical oceanography.

== Early life and education ==
Arculus was born in Calcutta, India. He graduated with a first-class degree in Geology from Durham University in 1970. He then earned a PhD from the same institution in 1973.

== Career ==
Arculus was a post-doctoral fellow of the Carnegie Institution for Science from 1973 to 1975. He was an assistant professor at Rice University in Houston, Texas from 1975 to 1976, and then spent six years as a research fellow at the Australian National University (ANU), before moving to the University of Michigan as assistant and later associate professor. He returned to Australia to work at the University of New England in 1989, where he was professor and head of the department of geology and geophysics.

Arculus joined ANU as a full professor in 1994. He successfully campaigned for Australia to join the Integrated Ocean Drilling Program and subsequently participated in a number of research voyages on board the Franklin and Southern Surveyor. From 2005 to 2008, he served as a co-chief editor of the Journal of Geophysical Research: Solid Earth, alongside John Mutter and Patrick Taylor. He was also elected a Fellow of the American Geophysical Union.

From October to December 2009, he was a fellow of the Institute of Advanced Study at Durham University.

Arculus was one of the leaders of International Ocean Discovery Program Expedition 351 to the Izu–Bonin–Mariana arc system, which he planned and implemented with Osamu Ishizuka and Kara Bogus. Research from the expedition provided evidence that subduction in the region began spontaneously around 52 million years ago.

In 2017 he argued that volcanic eruptions could take place in Melbourne or Auckland and suggested that volcanic eruptions may have contributed to the outbreak of war in ancient Egypt.

== Selected publications ==
=== Books ===
- Arculus, Richard J. (2008). Volcanic Arc Systems. Cambridge: Cambridge University Press. ISBN 978-0521877497.

=== Journal articles ===
- Arculus, Richard J.; Wills, Kevin J. A. (1980). "The petrology of plutonic blocks and inclusions from the Lesser Antilles island arc". Journal of Petrology. 21 (4): 743–799. doi:10.1093/petrology/21.4.743.
- ———; Powell, Roger (1986). "Source component mixing in the regions of arc magma generation" (PDF). Journal of Geophysical Research: Solid Earth. 91 (B6): 5913–5926. doi:10.1029/JB091iB06p05913.
- ——— (1994). "Aspects of magma genesis in arcs" (PDF). Lithos. 33 (1–3): 189–208. doi:10.1016/0024-4937(94)90060-4.
- ——— (2003). "Use and abuse of the terms calcalkaline and calcalkalic". Journal of Petrology. 44 (5): 929–935. doi:10.1093/petrology/44.5.929.
- ———; Ishizuka, Osamu; Bogus, Kara A.; et al. (2015). "A record of spontaneous subduction initiation in the Izu–Bonin–Mariana arc". Nature Geoscience. 8 (9): 728–733. doi:10.1038/ngeo2515. hdl:1805/7053.
