= Catholic Church in Belize =

The Catholic Church in Belize is part of the worldwide Catholic Church, under the spiritual leadership of the Pope in Rome. The country falls under the jurisdiction of the Diocese of Belize City-Belmopan. Approximately 40% of the population of Belize is Catholic.

The nunciature to Belize is combined with the nunciature to El Salvador. In 2005, Archbishop Luigi Pezzuto was appointed the apostolic nuncio to Belize. Bishops in Belize are members of the Antilles Episcopal Conference.

== History ==
Historians distinguish at least three periods in the history of the Catholic Church in Belize.

The first period saw missionaries accompany Spanish conquistadors among the Mayas in western Belize from 1524 until 1707. A century later separate incursions into the central, southern, and northern parts of the territory led to the first permanent residency of the Jesuits in Belize, in 1851. This marks the beginning of the second period, which saw the rapid spread of mission churches throughout Belize. The third period began with appointment of the first native bishop, thus handing over to the native, diocesan clergy administration of the Roman Catholic Diocese of Belize City-Belmopan.

=== Missionary ventures: 1524 to 1851 ===
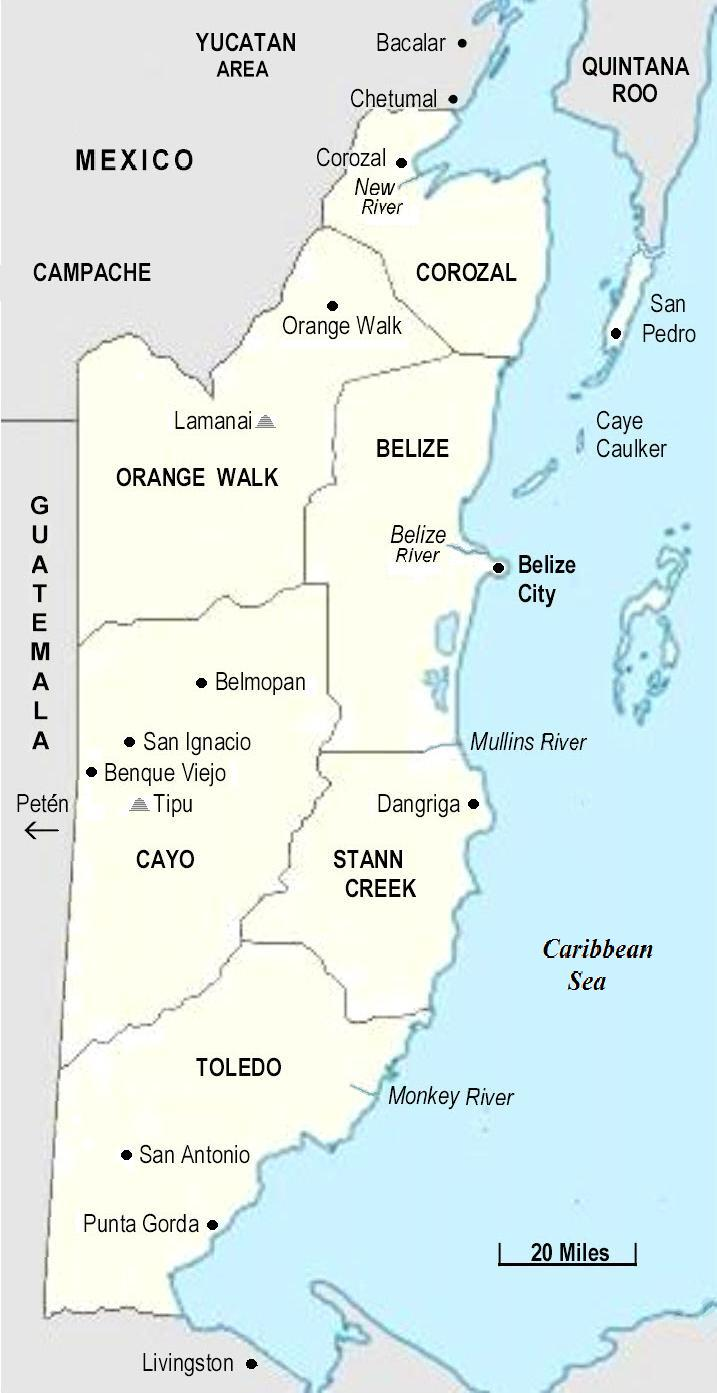

1524 to 1707: Friars accompanied the earliest Spanish expeditions into Central America, in accordance with the Patronato system and its intermingling of politics and religion. While the Spanish pursued the false hope of finding gold in Peten, Guatemala, the missionaries accompanied them south from Yucatan, Mexico, and north from Cobán, Guatemala. Scattered physical and documentary evidence of friars among the Maya in Western Belize exists for the period 1524 to 1707. Near the Maya site at Xunantunich in west central Belize lies Tipu with the remains of a primitive church building, mentioned in Spanish records, and a large number of Maya skeletons around its confines. Tipu ceased to exist as a Maya/Christian settlement in 1707 when the Spanish moved its residents to the shores of Lake Petén Itza. Sixty miles to the north of Tipu lies Lamanai (Indian Church) with the remaining stone walls of a missionary church and the ruins of a second church. Maya rebellions were frequent since the system of reducciones—gathering the scattered Maya into Spanish-controlled villages—meant paying taxes and loss of freedom. The South witnessed the only recorded martyrdom of missionaries in Belize: in 1684 at Paliac (Rio Grande, Toledo) three Franciscans and some Spaniards were martyred, presumably a sacrificial offering following the Maya method of ripping out the heart. But it was usually the political rather than the Christianizing effort that provoked Maya resistance. Missionaries who resumed the evangelizing effort over 100 years later would attest to remnants of Christian belief.

1830 to 1851: Around 1830 Catholic priests reappear in the historical record of Belize. Mestizos had come as refugees from Honduras to Mullins River south of Belize Town. Fray Antonio worked among them from 1832 to 1836 when he was replaced by Fray Rubio from Bacalar in Yucatan. Rubio built in Mullins River in 1837 the first Catholic church in modern Belize. Then in 1840, Frs. Sandoval and Rivas from Yucatan built a chapel in Belize Town. This had been the coastal center of the British logging industry in the central part of the colony since the late 18th century. The town was served by Anglican, Baptist, and Methodist ministers but Spanish merchants from Yucatan, along with mestizos and Garifuna from the South, would enlarge the Catholic community in the mid-19th century.

A large migration of Garifuna had come up the coast from Honduras in 1832, to what became Punta Gorda and Dangriga in the south of Belize. Their ancestry, of African and Carib Indian mix, traces to Saint Vincent. There they rebelled against the British in 1797 and were expelled to Roatán, from which they spread along the Honduran coast. By the 19th century they were settling along the southern coastline of Belize. They had been catechized by Spanish priests while on St. Vincent, as evidenced in “makeshift beads and crosses to ward off evil and danger." They would be sought after by the British as strong warriors and sturdy workers. But it was as good students and educators that they impacted Catholicism in Belize, with several priests and the first native bishop coming from their number. The Holy Family Sisters would come in 1898 specifically to minister to Garifuna communities, and within a century 45 Belizeans had joined these sisters.

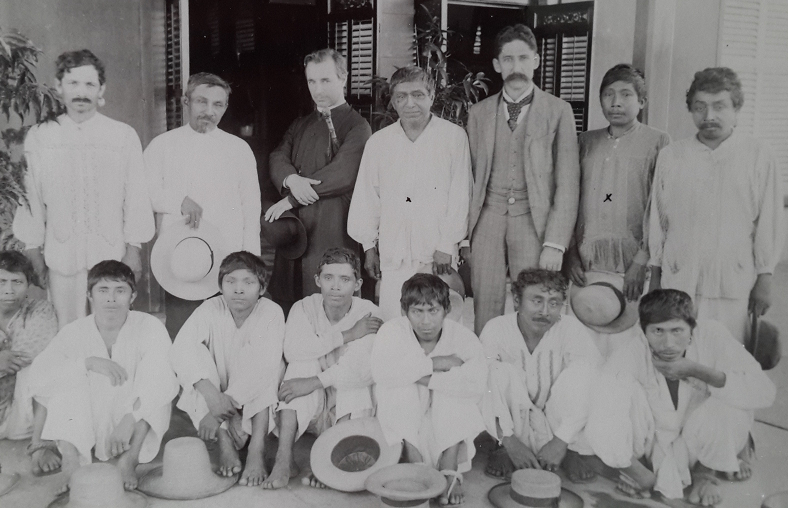
Jesuit H. Gillett & Icaiche c.1890

The third and largest migration to Belize followed the Caste War of Yucatan when Santa Cruz Maya drove out mestizos from the coast. Between 1847 and 1855 thousands of mestizos fled from Bacalar to Belize, enlarging Corozal and Orange Walk towns. By 1850 there were 7,000 Catholics in the territory, mostly Spanish and mestizo refugees of the Caste War in Yucatan. These mestizos also settled alongside the Icaiche Maya in the northern forests, with gradual movement down the western high ground, above the coastal swamps. In the West, the township of Benque Viejo del Carmen was followed after some years by El Cayo whose population grew from the timber industry that had moved west along the Belize River. Missionary contacts with the Santa Cruz, Icaiche, and mestizos are mentioned in several of the "Letters and Notices" of the English Province of Jesuits who would arrive in 1851.

=== Jesuit mission: 1851 to 1983 ===
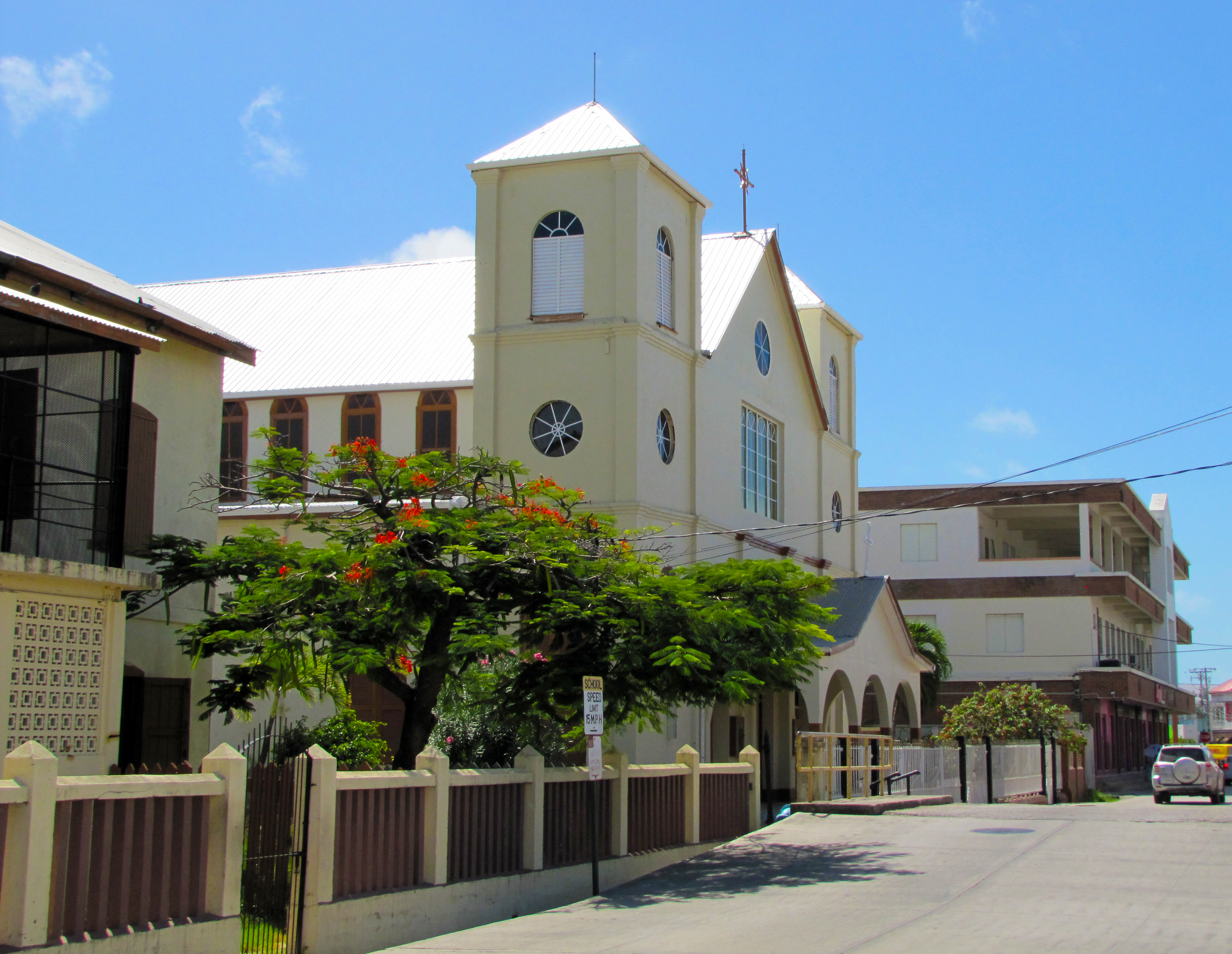
Holy Redeemer parish complex

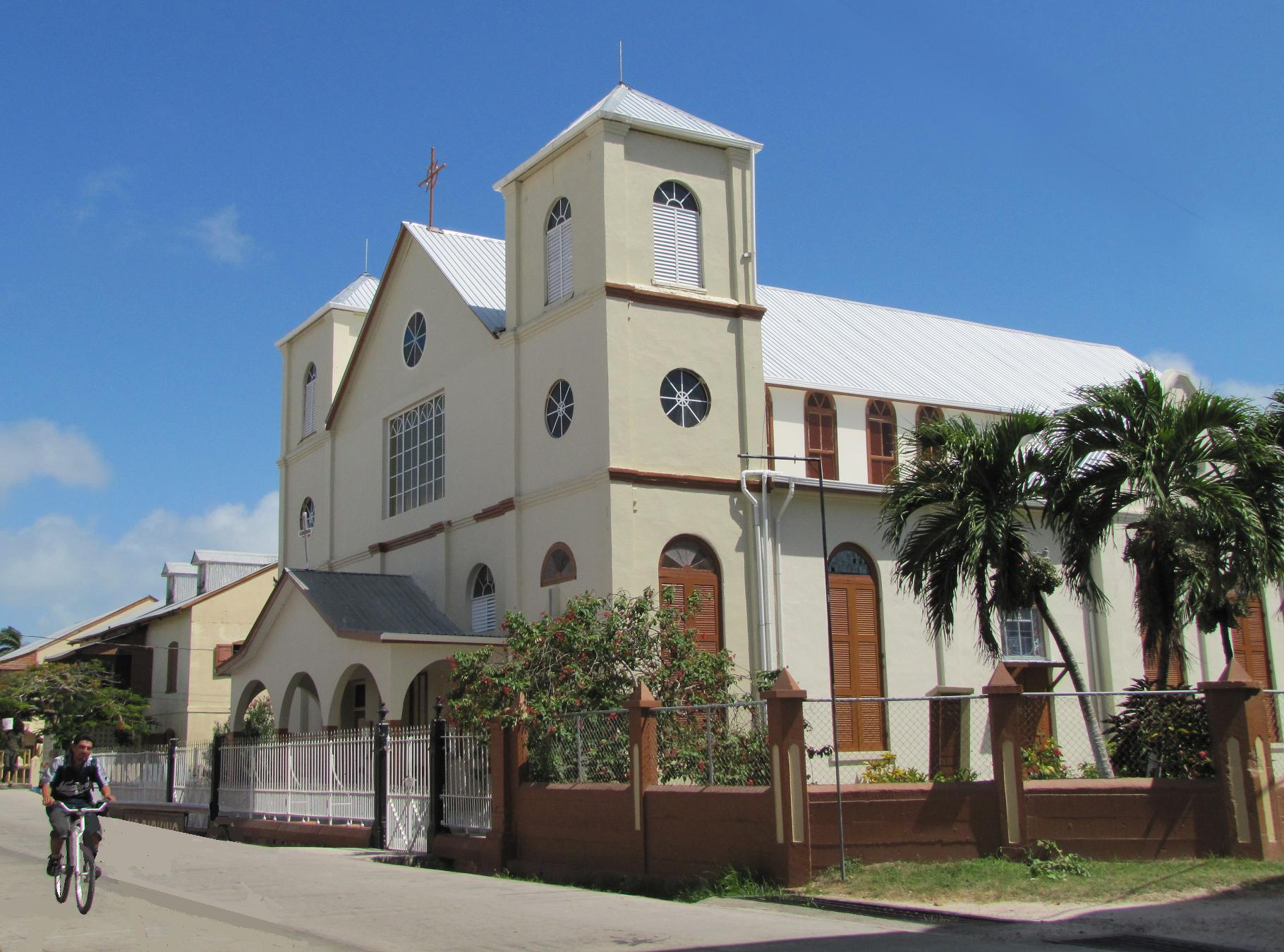
Holy Redeemer Cathedral Belize City, built 1858

In 1837 the Catholic mission office in Rome made Jamaica a vicariate responsible for the whole Caribbean area. With few resources spread over this vast region, little attention was given to the territory of Belize until Catholics of Spanish ancestry were driven from Yucatan to northern Belize during their strife with the Maya (1847–1901). After this influx of Catholics, in 1851, Belize was made a Jesuit mission under the care of the English Province of the Jesuits, eleven years before it became the crown colony of British Honduras. In December 1851 the vicar apostolic from Jamaica, along with his successor in 1855, Jesuit Fr. James Eustace Du Peyron, travelled to Belize to assess the situation. Du Peyron would oversee the building of the first Catholic church in Belize Town for what is today Holy Redeemer parish. The great fire of July 17, 1856, destroyed the north side of town including the church building. By April 1858 the present Holy Redeemer Cathedral building was completed. Other parishes followed along the coastline: Corozal (1859), with a large population of mestizo Catholics; Punta Gorda (1862) with Garifuna on the coast and Maya inland; and Stann Creek (1867) mostly Garifuna. Between 1852 and 1893, 58 Jesuits from 10 countries came to establish these churches: from Italy (18), England (14), Spain (11), Belgian (5), France (3), Ireland (3), Germany (1), Greece (1), Guatemala (1), Columbia (1).

In 1888 British Honduras became a prefecture and in 1893 a vicariate with Salvatore di Pietro, S.J., as prefect apostolic and then vicar apostolic with the title of bishop. The presence of three American bishops for his consecration evidenced the growing importance of the United States to the mission. In 1894 the Jesuits transferred responsibility for British Honduras from the English Province to the Missouri Province of the central United States. Bishop di Pietro died in 1898 and was succeeded by Bishop Frederick C. Hopkins, S.J., the last of the English Jesuits in Belize.

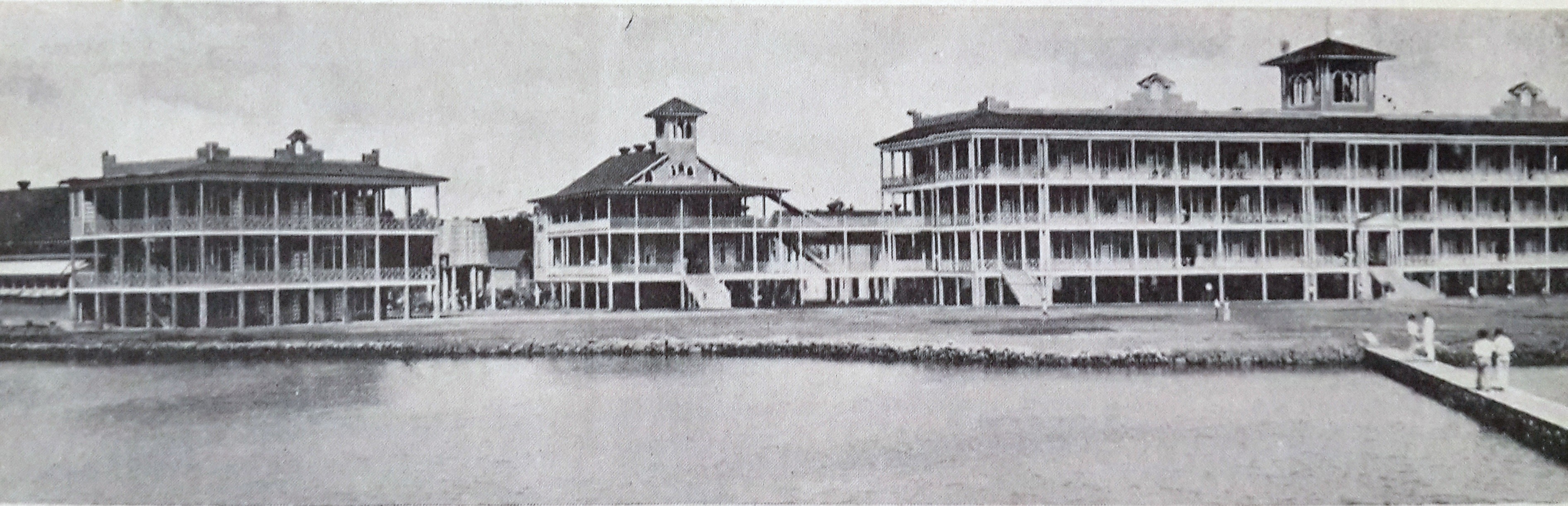
St. John's College at Loyola Park, 1917

Permanent parishes among the Maya in west central Belize were begun in Benque Viejo (1905) and San Ignacio (1909). St. John's College, founded at the cathedral in 1887, was moved to Loyola Park in 1917. In 1923 Bishop Hopkins along with two Pallottine sisters drowned when the boat they were taking to Corozal sank.

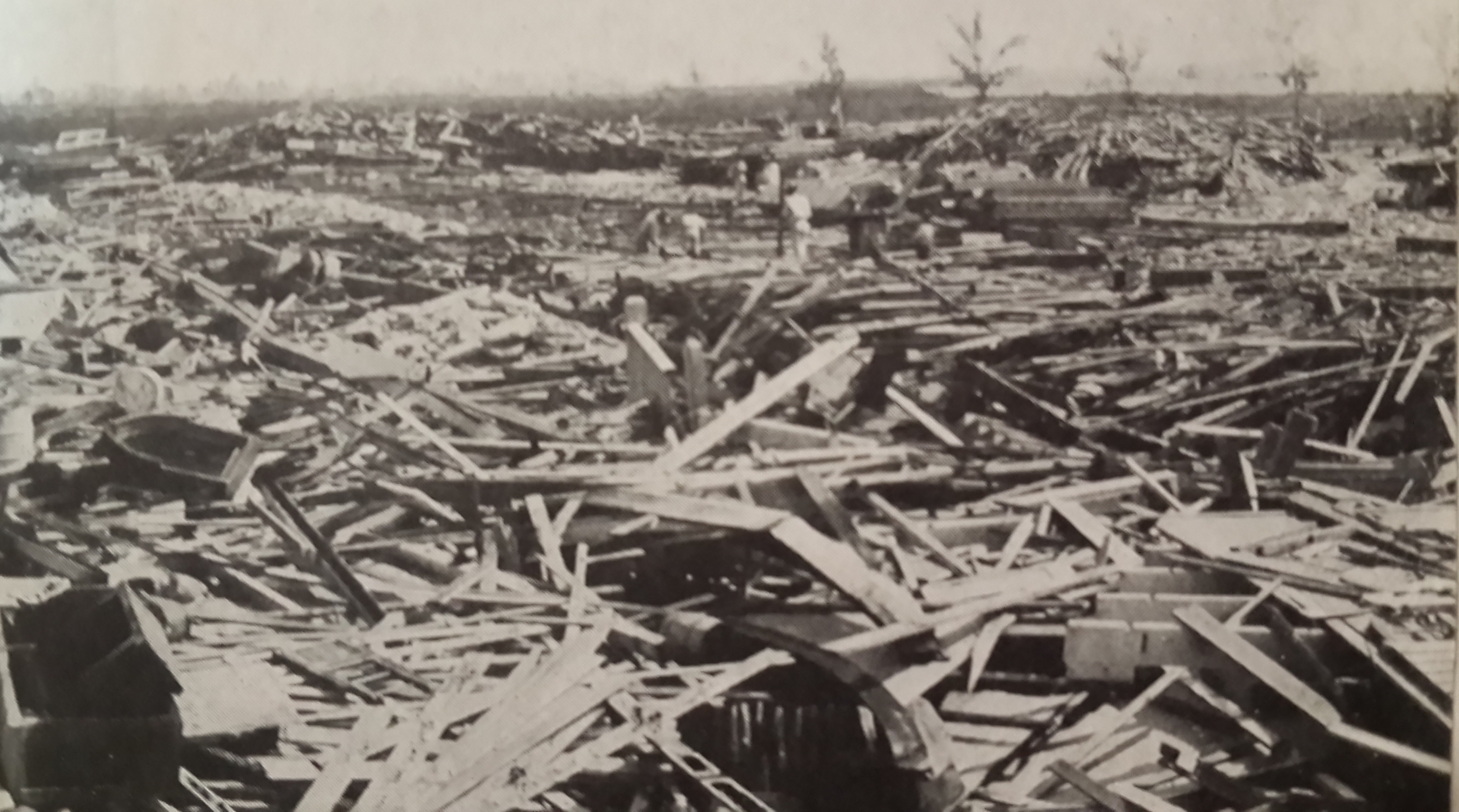
St. John's College after 1931 hurricane

Bishop Joseph Anthony Murphy, S.J., succeeded Hopkins. His tenure was marked by a rebuilding effort following the hurricane of 1931, that destroyed St. John's College at Loyola Park and took an estimated 2500 lives including eleven Jesuits. He also built Holy Redeemer Hall which became the premier indoor facility for large events in Belize, until the construction of Bliss Institute in 1954. In 1938 at the age of 80 Bishop Murphy retired and Bishop William A. Rice, S.J., succeeded him. Rice died of a heart attack in 1946. Next came the last vicar apostolic of Belize, David Francis Hickey, S.J., who would become first bishop of the Diocese of Belize when it was raised from vicariate status in 1956. In 1957 he resigned and Bishop Robert Louis Hodapp, S.J., replaced him. Hodapp remained in office for 25 years, attending all five sessions of the Second Vatican Council and working toward its implementation in the diocese. He resigned in 1983.

=== Native clergy and laity: from 1983 ===
In 1982 Fr. Osmond Peter Martin, from the Garifuna people, became the first native Belizean to be raised to the episcopacy. He became auxiliary to Hodapp and then in 1983 bishop of the diocese. Martin summoned the first diocesan synod in 1989, focused on activating the laity to take ownership of their church. In April 2001 he inaugurated at the cathedral the Monsignor Facundo Castillo Diocesan Center, home to the diocesan radio, television, and newspaper ministries. Dorick M. Wright became auxiliary in 2002 and succeeded Martin in 2007. Due to Wright's failing eyesight, in 2012 Christopher Glancy was named auxiliary and assumed many of the responsibilities of the diocese. The number of Catholics in Belize had grown by 16,414 or 15% since 1991, while total population had grown by 131,723 or 70% in the same period. The number of Belizeans entering the diocesan priesthood was six from the 1930s through 1950s, then peaked with eleven in the 1960s through 1980s, but from then to 2014 had fallen to three. In 2013 Bishop Wright opened a minor seminary, St. Benedict's Diocesan Seminary, in the facility built by the Benedictines near Santa Elena. Four young men constituted its first class. Bishop Lawrence Sydney Nicasio took office on May 13, 2017. Bishop Emeritus Dorick McGowan Wright died on April 15, 2020.

== Religious congregations ==
=== Jesuits ===
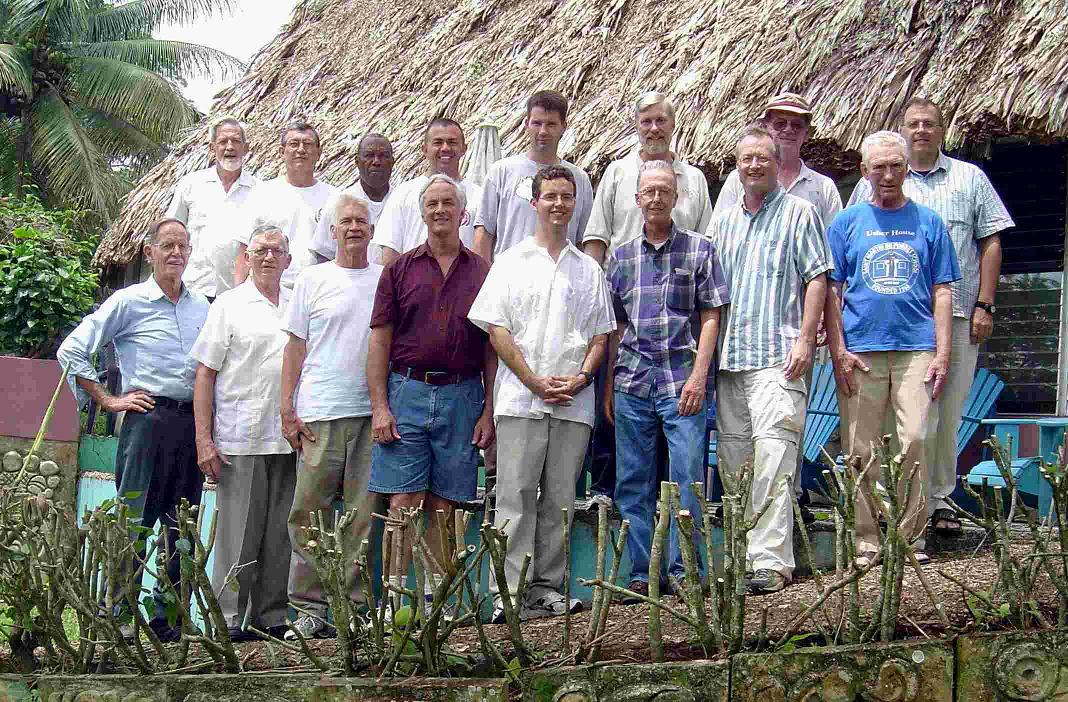
Jesuits working in Belize c.2008

The Jesuits (S.J.) were responsible for establishing a permanent Catholic presence in Belize beginning in 1851, as detailed above. From then until 2015, 374 Jesuits worked in Belize, founding most of the parishes and missions. They also founded Trinidad Farm Retreat Center near Belize City. In 2015 they remained as pastors at St.Martin de Porres parish in Belize City and at the largely Garifuna St. Peter Claver parish in Punta Gorda, with its 30 Maya mission stations and schools. In June 1885 Jesuit Henry Gillett began publication of The Angelus, “a Catholic monthly periodical … written partly in English and partly in Spanish, … [intended] to refute error and to give people correct information about Catholic affairs.” It included substantial documentation, as in Fr. Hopkins's 1851-1893 “Historical Sketch of the Catholic Mission in Belize” published in 1897. The Angelus ceased publication in 1905. The current Catholic monthly The Christian Herald began publication in September 1979 under Jesuit Fr. Maher, who also initiated the diocesan radio and television apostolates. St. John's College (SJC), which "would become one of the largest and most prestigious educational institutions in the country," was founded by Fr. Cassian Gillett, S.J., in 1887, in quarters on the cathedral grounds. It moved to a spacious Loyola Park campus south of town in 1917 where it served as a boarding school for many who would become leaders in Belize and throughout Central America. The hurricane of 1931 destroyed the Loyola Park campus (see above), taking the lives of 6 priests, 1 brother, and 4 scholastics. SJC then returned to the cathedral grounds until 1952 when it moved to a spacious campus northwest of town. It now has 20 buildings to accommodate its secondary and junior college divisions, and an additional extension division in town. In the late 1890s celebrated Jesuit naturalist William A. Stanton taught at St. John's College. The influence of Jesuit education on Belizean politics is covered under "Apostolic works" below, along with their part in initiating credit unions and cooperatives in Belize. The Boy Scout movement in Belize was introduced by Brother "Jake" Jacoby in Holy Redeemer parish during his long tenure in Belize, 1928 to 1957.

=== Sisters of Mercy ===
In 1883 the Sisters of Mercy (R.S.M.) came to Belize and established a lasting presence. Since then 156 of their number have worked in Belize. Bishops di Pietro and Hopkins did much to secure their services and then to arrange for their separate foundation in Belize, independent of the motherhouse in New Orleans. On coming to Belize, the sisters assumed the task of running Holy Redeemer Primary School that by the early 1900s enrolled nearly 400 students. Their three-storey brick convent and school building, built in 1885, was destroyed by the 1931 hurricane. It was rebuilt in 1935 along with an elementary school and St. Catherine Academy which continues to educate girls in the Belize City area. On the same campus is Our Lady of Guadalupe Mercy Center, which accommodated 1600 persons in 2014 for retreats and other programs. Since 1967 the Mercies have managed Muffles College in Orange Walk Town. They also inaugurated Belmopan Comprehensive School in 1970, Mercy clinic in 1981, and Mercy Kitchen in 1986. Together with a Sister of Charity of Nazareth they founded a clinic for Mayan women in rural Toledo in 1964. In 2012 Sr. M. Caritas Lawrence, R.S.M., an educator, liturgical translator from Mayan to English, and senior officer in the Ministry of Education, was awarded the Order of the British Empire by Queen Elizabeth for her life's work.

=== Holy Family Sisters ===
The Holy Family Sisters (S.S.F.), an African-American congregation from New Orleans, arrived in 1898 to manage the small parochial school in Dangriga. By 2000, 95 had served in Belize, of whom 19 were native Belizeans. They founded Austin High School for Girls, since amalgamated, and Delille Academy in Dangriga, and also have charge of two grade schools. There have been 27 Belizeans who joined the congregation and served only abroad.

=== The Pallottines ===
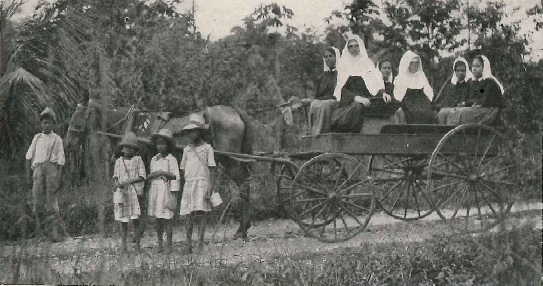
Pallottine Sisters

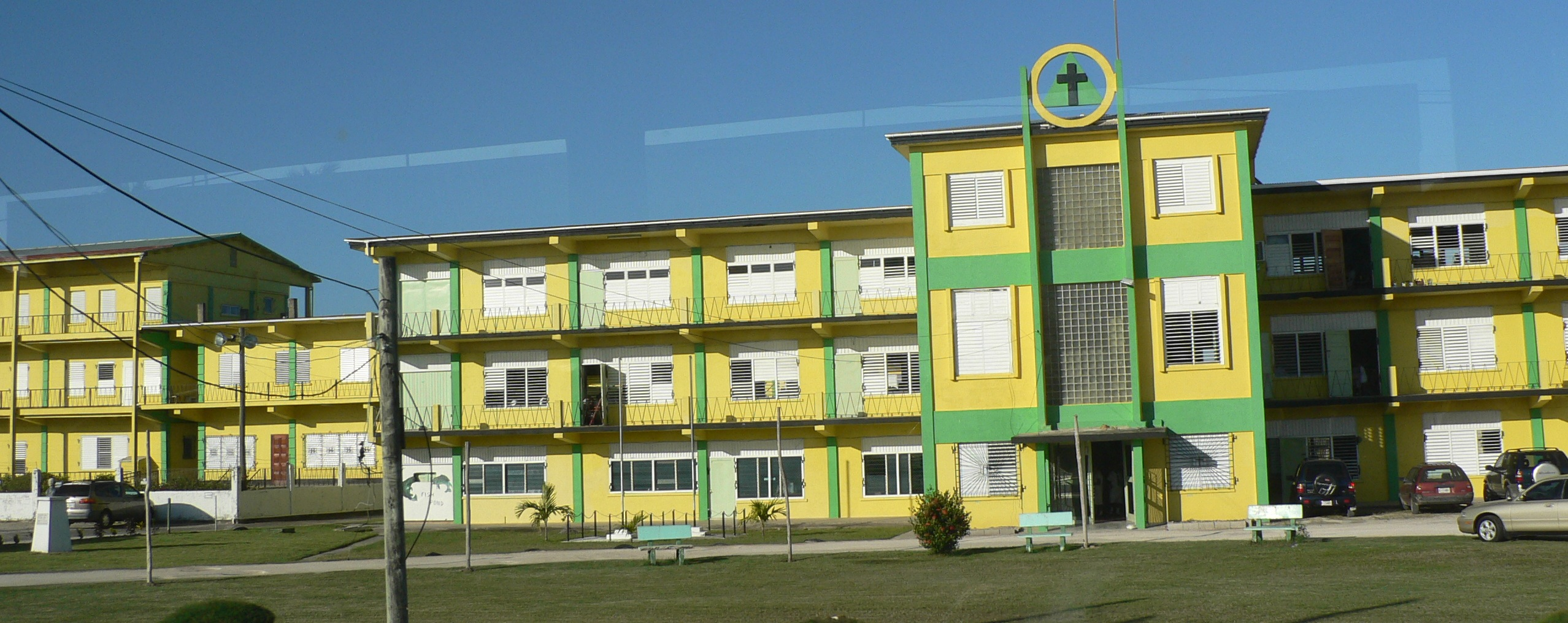
Pallotti High School

Arriving in 1913, the Pallottines (S.A.C.) established convents in Benque Viejo and Corozal, and later throughout Belize. By 2001, 162 had served in Belize, of whom 69 were native Belizeans. In 1931 they built a large novitiate near Punta Gorda, from which they minister in 30 Maya villages that have Catholic chapels and schools. In 1957 they opened Pallotti High School for girls in Belize City (at right). In 1968 Belize became an independent province of their congregation. In 2013 their century of service was commemorated by a Belizean stamp.

=== Sisters of Charity of Nazareth ===
In 1975 the Sisters of Charity of Nazareth (S.C.N.) were called to assist at Sacred Heart Parish in Dangriga and then to foster lay ministry in the spirit of renewal in the Catholic church. From 1975 to 2014, 22 had worked in Belize, of whom 4 were Belizean. In 2014 Sr. Barbara Flores, S.C.N., was the President/General Manager of Catholic Public Schools.

=== Madrecitas (Our Lady of the Light) ===
In 1975 these religious sisters began coming four at a time from Mexico and realizing their charism of evangelizing in remote villages, first in Orange Walk District then also in Corozal District. In 1979 they opened a convent in San Juan Village, Corozal. By 2000, 22 had worked in Belize, of whom 11 were Belizean.

=== Guadalupanas and Dominican Sisters ===
The Guadalupana sisters from Mérida, Yucatan, worked in lay ministry at St. Francis Xavier Parish in Corozal during the 1970s and early 1980s. From 1985 to 1994 six Sisters of the Dominican Order from Springfield, Kentucky, also served in Belize.

=== Society of Our Lady of the Most Holy Trinity ===
The Society of Our Lady of the Most Holy Trinity (SOLT) includes both lay and religious, men and women. Its mission to Belize began in the late 1960s in Benque Viejo in the areas of health care and pastoring. This expanded into managing schools and teaching at the secondary level. Then in 1976 Deacon Cal Cathers of SOLT founded BRC Printing Limited to print primarily reading and math textbooks for schools. In 1990 SOLT founded Mt. Carmel High School in Benque, staffed largely by foreign volunteers, and also opened Divine Mercy Church in Belize City. In 1998, John Marhevka of SOLT founded a Catholic bookstore and radio station in Benque. In 2005, he built a media center and radio station in Belize City and in 2010 Power FM Catholic Youth Radio began broadcasting, to which was added Radio Guadalupe Catholic Radio Station in 2013. By 2014, 20 members had served in Belize for extended periods of time.

=== The Benedictines ===
In 1971, the Benedictine monks (O.S.B.) from Subiaco Abbey (Arkansas) established a monastery near Santa Elena, Belize. By 1999, 23 Benedictines had served in Belize, but the monastery was then closed for lack of numbers. The fine buildings and property were bequeathed to the Diocese and in 2013 re-opened as St. Benedict Diocesan Seminary.

=== The Viatorians ===
The Viatorians (C.S.V.) came to Xavier Parish in Corozal in 1998. They organized teacher training workshops, especially for catechists. They assumed responsibility for and expanded the high school in Chunox, Corozal District, enlarging its departments in agriculture, science, computers, and home economics. After much consultation, they implemented a pastoral plan that would unify the parish with its many missions. In May 2012 Fr. Christopher Glancy, C.S.V., who had guided Xavier parish in Corozal through much of its renewal, was called to the episcopacy to assist Bishop Dorick M. Wright whose eyesight was failing. In 2014, after supplying 11 members for its work in Belize and realizing one Belizean member's ordination, they could no longer supply men and withdrew from Belize.

=== Columbans and Claretians ===
Coming in 1986, 15 Columbans served at St. Ignatius, St. Vianney, and Ladyville around Belize City as well as in Dangriga, leaving in 1999. Four Claretians also served in Dangriga, between 2002 and 2014.

== Apostolic works ==
=== Independence movement ===
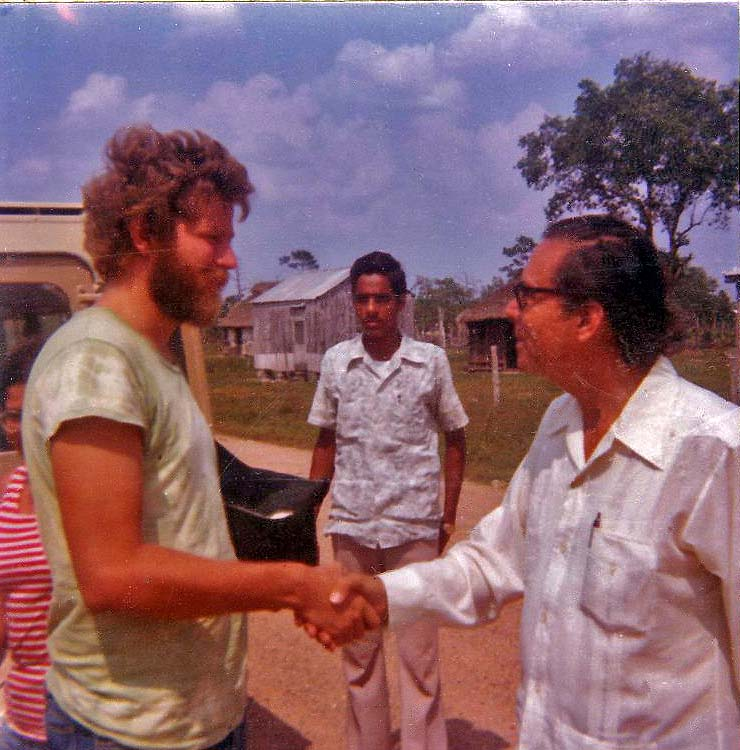
Price and Peace Corps volunteer

Edward J. O’Donnell, S.J., before becoming president of Marquette University, led discussion classes at St. John's College night school from 1945 to 1948, based on Pope Pius XI’s social encyclical Quadragesimo anno (1931). Class members included future political and People's United Party leaders George Cadle Price, Philip Goldson, Herman Jex, John Albert Smith, Leigh Richardson, and Nick Pollard Sr. Price, popularly known as the "Father of the Nation," led Belize through its independence movement, holding the top office in the country for a cumulative 27 years. Price’s authorized biographer observes that Price had great respect for the Jesuits, and his policies based on social justice are easily traced to Quadragesimo anno. The editor of Amandala newspaper, Evan X Hyde, stated that “the Catholic Church in British Honduras … achieved political power when George Price became PUP leader.” He is pictured here with Peace Corps volunteers.

=== Credit unions and cooperatives ===
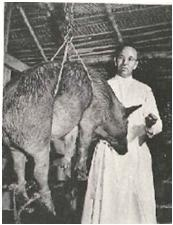
Fr. Ulrich's scale

Marion M. Ganey, S.J., was largely responsible for introducing cooperatives and credit unions to Belize beginning in 1943, in response to Pius XI’s social encyclical Quadragesimo anno. Within 10 years of the first credit union, the colony had 22 credit unions and the “various cooperatives embraced consumer, marketing, housing, hog, chicle, and farmers co-operatives.” The religious sisters did their part, the Pallottines in Punta Gorda in the 1940s teaching girls the canning of produce. In 1951 Jesuit Fr. William Ulrich gave the Maya of San Antonio village a scale for weighing their hogs, protecting them from sharkers who grossly underestimated the weight. From increased revenue the villagers bought a truck to carry their hogs and other produce to market, and a hog cooperative was formed. Ulrich's action also impacted village politics. By encouraging “the election of younger and more progressive men to the Alcalde’s Council which had been set up by Fr. Knopp” this “irretrievably altered the traditional relationship between the old and the young.” The credit union movement included Jesuit Henry Sutti, the first priest to come out of Boys Town, Nebraska, and in 1943 founder of the Holy Redeemer Credit Union, which in 2009 was capitalized at Bz$322.7 million with 42,262 members. Since 1956, the Director of the Credit union has been Jane Ellen Usher.

=== Schools ===
From the 1850s laws were enacted in British Honduras so that by the end of the century the church-state system of education was well established, with payment by results, for the benefit of every denomination of Christians. But the problem of finding qualified teachers persisted. From the late 1940s prospective teachers among Catholic young men were hosted in a teachers’ hostel on New Road in Belize City, to return to their villages as teachers. This lasted until the building was destroyed by Hurricane Hattie in 1961. By then several future government ministers and Fr. Calistus Cayetano had received their education through this program. In 1957 Fr. John Stochl introduced a high school equivalency program for adults in the downtown Extension Division of SJC. The first government secondary school, Technical High School, did not open until 1952. In 1954 the Diocese established St. John's Teacher Training College at Holy Redeemer. In 1965, it was amalgamated with the government's St. George's Teachers’ College to become Belize Teachers’ College. At that time total enrollment at five church-run schools in Belize City was 815 students; of these, 589 were in primary school and 226 were in secondary school. In 1961 two more Catholic secondary schools were opened: St. Francis Xavier in Corozal and St. Peter Claver in Punta Gorda.

In 1953 an agricultural branch of St. John's College, called Lynam College, was opened in Stann Creek on land lent by the government. The college operated until 1971 when lack of funding and criticism that it was not fulfilling its function as an agricultural school caused its closing. After the hjurricane of 1931, St.John's College returned to the cathedral grounds until 1952 when it moved to a spacious campus northwest of town. It now has 20 buildings to accommodate its secondary and junior college divisions. St. John's Junior College grew out of the Sixth Form (1952) that was connected to the high school (1887). In 1966 it began offering associate degrees in affiliation with the American Association of Community Colleges. Two more Catholic junior colleges were founded in the 1990s. Muffles Junior College near Orange Walk Town was opened in 1992. It grew out of Muffles High School that originated in 1953. And Sacred Heart Junior College in San Ignacio Town was opened in 1999. It grew out of Sacred Heart High School which was the first secondary school in Cayo District when it opened in 1960. Seminarians from nearby St. Benedict's attend Sacred Heart Junior College. By 2015 the Catholic church had 148 elementary schools, attached to all of its 18 parishes and to most all of its mission stations, along with 11 high schools and 3 junior colleges. Not until 1986 did the government found a university independent of church control. There have been efforts to detach education from the British A-level system and associate it more closely to the American system of accreditation, but the Chamber of Commerce and Rotary business people resisted.

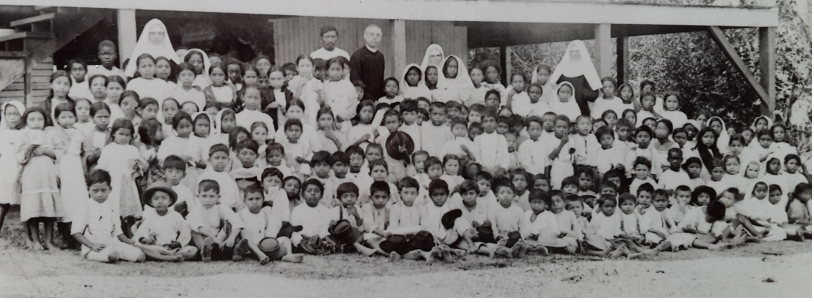
Pallottine Communion class in Benque

Sir Alan Burns, Governor of British Honduras (1934–1939), used Benque Viejo as an example of one challenge that teaching in Belizean schools presents: “I have heard German nuns trying to teach Maya children out of an English textbook which they had to explain in Spanish.” The solution, in higher education at least, has been to require English in the classroom. The Garifuna have enculturated the Catholic Mass and have it in their own language. As regards the Kriol language which most speak in Belize City there has been more controversy. Several Christian churches have introduced Kriol into their services and a Kriol New Testament has been produced. But the Catholic Mass, requiring approval from Roman authorities, has not been translated into Kriol. On the other hand, Catholics are deeply involved in the Kriol Council, and St. John's College through its Belize Institute for Social Research and Action (BISRA) publishes Belizean Studies which carries articles on the role of Kriol and other cultures in Belizean Society.

In 1970 Ms. Signa Yorke was the first layperson appointed dean of sixth form at the Jesuit-run St. John's College. Then the by-laws of the college were rewritten so that the Jesuit superior for Belize was no longer automatically president of the college and lay members were added to the board of trustees. Mr. Stuart Simmons was appointed the first lay principal of the high school division. In 1994 the by-laws were again changed so that a lay person could be president of the college, and in 1999 Mr. Carlos Perdomo became the first lay president. The chairperson of the board had already for many years been a layperson. Over 25 years the transition to lay leadership was effected, while efforts were made to assure the continuing presence of the Jesuit charism in the college. At St. Catherine Academy Mrs. Alice Castillo became the first lay principal in 1997.

Prominent graduates. Zee Edgell attended St. Catherine Academy and is author of the award-winning novel Beka Lamb. Those attending some division of St. John's College and prominent in government service include Emil Arguelles, Johnny Briceño, Jorge Espat, Manuel Esquivel, Francis Fonseca, Ralph Fonseca, Caritas Lawrence, Zenaida Moya, Said Musa, George Cadle Price. Prominent graduates of other Catholic schools include Dolores Balderamos-García, Antonio Soberanis Gómez, Gaspar Vega.

== Jesuit Missions gallery ==
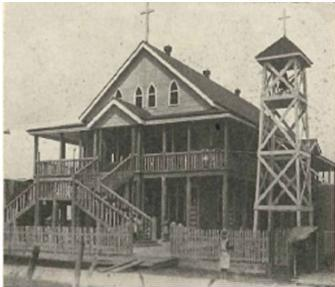
Original St. Ignatius church, Belize City, 1933

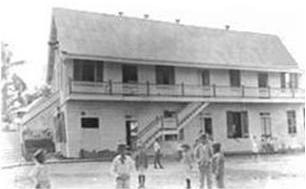
St. John's College by Holy Redeemer church, 1944

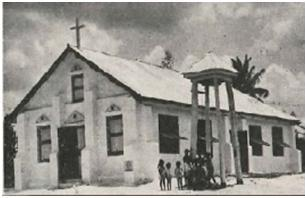
Stann Creek, 1945

== See also ==
- Religion in Belize
- Holy Redeemer Catholic Parish, Belize City
- St. Martin de Porres Parish, Belize City
- St. Peter Claver Parish, Punta Gorda
- Sacred Heart Parish, Dangriga
