= Muffles Junior College =

Catholic junior university college in Belize

- Motto: Making Christian education meaningful
- Type: Junior university college
- Established: 1992; 34 years ago
- Founders: Society of Jesus
- Affiliations: Association of Tertiary Level Institutions of Belize; Caribbean Area Network for Quality Assurance in Tertiary Education
- Religious affiliation: Catholicism (Sisters of Mercy)
- Location: San Estevan Road, Orange Walk Town, Orange Walk District, Belize; 18°5′42.44″N 88°32′24.25″W
- Website: www.mufflesjuniorcollegebz.com
- Location in Belize

Muffles Junior College is a Catholic junior university college, located in Orange Walk District, Belize. Established in 1954 by the Society of Jesus, the college has been administered by the Sisters of Mercy since 1967.

== History ==
In 1954 Jesuit Fr. Ring helped launch a high school in Orange Walk, named after Fr. Joseph Meuffels, S.J. (The spelling of the college name was adjusted to the way it is pronounced.) The Sisters of Mercy took charge of the school in 1967. In 1992 the need for tertiary level classes in Orange Walk District led to the first junior college classes at Muffles, with an enrollment of thirty-eight students pursuing the Associate Degree in Business Science. The first graduating class on June 11, 1994, numbered 22. With the support of the local community and government, Muffles Junior College relocated to its own campus in 2002. By 2012 nine associate degree programs enrolled approximately 400 students.

Muffles College is named after Fr. Joseph Meuffels, a Jesuit from The Netherlands who arrived in Belize in 1898 and taught at St. John’s College for two years. In 1900 he began a twenty-year stint pastoring the Orange Walk church. He saw through the building of the present Inmaculada, replacing the earlier building destroyed by fire on November 28, 1899. With the help of Brother Naughton, S.J., Meuffels expanded the work of the schools and in 1914 brought the Pallottines to Orange Walk. In 1920 he returned to St. John’s College where he taught religion and was a counselor until his death on January 23, 1931.

== Gallery ==
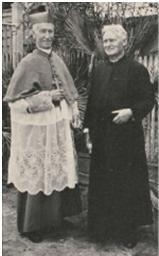
Bishop Joseph Murphy with Fr. Joseph Meuffels, in 1928

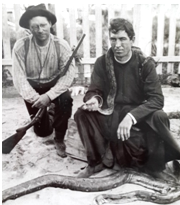
Jesuit Frs. Joseph Meuffels and "Buck" Stanton, c. 1908

== See also ==
- Catholic Church in Belize
- Education in Belize
