= Sacred Heart Church, Dangriga =

Catholic church in Dangriga, Belize

Coordinates: 16°58′13.84″N 88°13′17.98″W

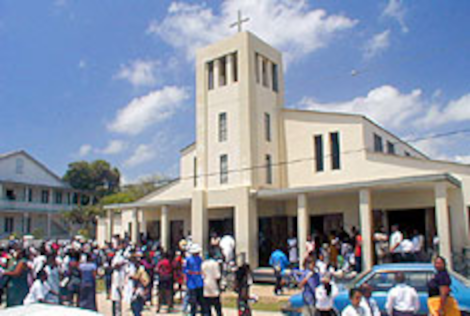
Sacred Heart Catholic Church, Dangriga, Stann Creek, Belize

Sacred Heart Church is a Roman Catholic parish in Dangriga, Belize.

== Early contacts ==
The Garifuna migrated to the southern shore of Belize in the late 18th century. Their womenfolk cultivated the rich alluvial river banks while the men were fishermen. Preceding them to Stann Creek town (later Dangriga) were some Black Creoles and a few whites who were served by Anglican and Methodist missionaries. In 1834 these missionaries built a chapel for the Garifuna in Stann Creek. There was then a cumulative population of about 500 in Stann Creek and the closely associated town of Mullins River ten miles to the north that had already become a focus of Catholic missionary activity.

The first evidence that a Catholic priest had been in Stann Creek comes from 1830. Thomas Jeffries, a Methodist minister, said that the Garifuna wore “makeshift beads and crosses to ward off evil and danger, a practice they explained as an inheritance from earlier instruction by Spanish priests.” Mullins River with its colony of immigrant mestizos from Honduras remained the more important Catholic mission until 1867.

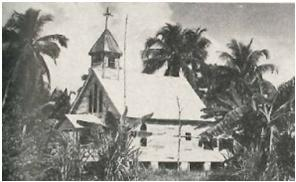
1871 church, as seen in 1945

In 1862 Jesuit Fr. Genon was covering Stann Creek from Punta Gorda. Then in 1867 Jesuit Fr. Brindisi built the first Catholic rectory and church in Stann Creek. In 1871 he built a better church “with pillars and naves and a goodly size”, and had the assistance of a diocesan missionary priest Leon Maclluchet from 1874 to 1879. In 1877 Fr. Alfonso Parisi replaced Fr. Brindisi. He built a school in Stann Creek and a new chapel at Mullins River.

Writing in 1874, Jesuit Fr. Pittar described the Garifuna congregation as “remarkably gentle and docile in their conduct … and not a little superstitious.” One superstition he referred to was the belief that spirits of the dead communicate with the living, the dugu ceremony or “spiritualism.” For decades into the 20th century the church and government tried to stamp out this custom. But it has endured with mutual influence: the cross and statues of the Virgin Mary might be placed on the altar in the Dubuyaba, and the Buyei encourage attendance at Christian church services, especially for thanksgiving. Garifuna priests now regard this cultural tradition favorably. The Catholic Mass has been translated into Garifuna and has been enculturated, as displayed at the annual celebration of Garifuna Settlement Day each November 19.

== Prominence ==
In 1890 a contingent of Catholics from each of the districts, about 300 strong, gathered at Sacred Heart Church in Stann Creek for the consecration of the Prefecture to the Sacred Heart, a devotion that had come to flourish in the colony. A grand parade with banners and bands processed through town along with Prefect Salvatore di Pietro and the members of the Catholic Association. This all-inclusive event created a future pattern for cultural harmony at Catholic liturgies. It would no longer be the mestizo or Creole or Garifuna church or the church of the elite but the church of all the people. By the mid-1890s, Dangriga had a population of 3965 of whom about 3000 were Catholic. The church building could accommodate 800.

== Education ==
In 1894 in Stann Creek, beginning in standard 6, the best students received extra classes to enable them to teach in the primary schools, especially in the rural areas. Graduates who were able and willing were hired for a pittance to help in the primary schools of their communities while preparing to qualify as certified teachers. The Garifuna took well to learning and would be essential to the educational efforts of the Catholic church in Belize. In 1897 the Sisters of the Holy Family arrived from New Orleans principally to serve in Stann Creek. They managed Sacred Heart parochial school, Holy Angels in nearby Pomona, and founded Austin High School for Girls, since amalgamated. In 2015 there were 14 Catholic primary schools in Stann Creek District.

== Long-standing pastors ==
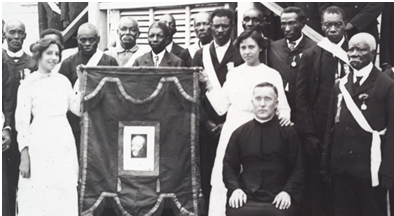
Jesuit Fr. Lynam with Catholic Knights of Belize c. 1910

In 1903 Fr. Joe Lynam replaced Joe Rigge as pastor and remained until 1910. In six years Lynam recorded 541 baptisms, 242 marriages, and 310 deaths. Also serving at this time were Spanish Jesuit Matthew Antillach (1893–1910) and Fr. Edmond Coony (1904–1918; 1921–1929). Following him was Fr. Michael Schaefer (1929–1935). In 1931 Stann Creek welcomed its first native priest, Fr. Sebastian Arjonilla. While John Knopp served as pastor (1941–1945; 1954–1957), a plague of locusts destroyed people’s crops (1941) and a hurricane destroyed two schools. Then in January 1942 a fire completely destroyed the church and convent. The present church building was built in 1954. In 1945 Robert McCormack became pastor in Stann Creek. In 1953 he helped open Lynam College nine miles outside of town, which for 18 years served as the country’s only agricultural college, closing in 1971. There followed the pastors William Thro 1963–1970, who built a new rectory, Howard Oliver 1970–1980, and James Short 1981–1989 who had recruited the Sisters of Charity of Nazareth for Belize in 1975 to assist with pastoral ministry at Sacred Heart. The involvement of the laity was formalized into a Lay Ministry Program for Sacred Heart Parish that, in 1980, saw 37 men and women begin the year-long process of preparation. This increased the self-confidence level of lay ministers, as they conducted prayer and Communion services in rural areas and took Communion to the sick. In 1959 Garifuna Osmond P. Martin was ordained to the priesthood in his home parish of Sacred Heart in Stann Creek. He would become the first native bishop of Belize in 1983.
