= San Antonio, Toledo =

San Antonio
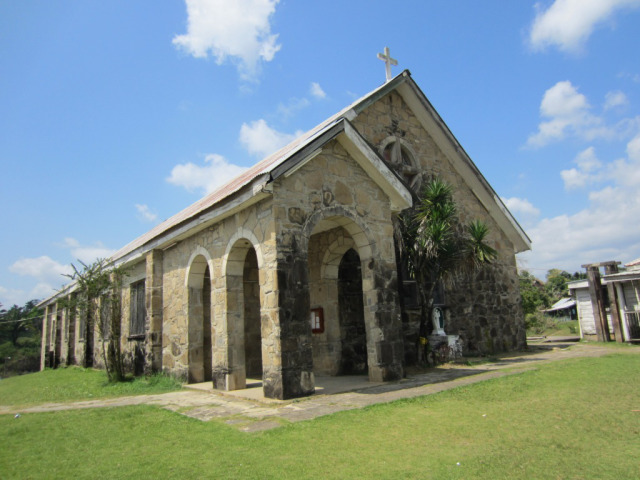
- Roman Catholic Church in San Antonio

- Location within Belize
- Coordinates: 16°14′40″N 89°01′25″W
- Country: Belize
- District: Toledo
- Constituency: Toledo West

Population (2010)
  - Total: 1,204
- Time zone: UTC-6 (Central)
- Climate: Af

San Antonio is a village in the Toledo District of Belize. It is the largest Maya settlement in Belize, with a population of approximately 1,000 people, predominantly Mopan Maya. About 88% of the inhabitants are Catholic, with 8% belonging to other Christian denominations, and 4% being non-denominational. Along with 29 other mission parishes in the Toledo District, it is pastored by Jesuits from St. Peter Claver church in Punta Gorda.

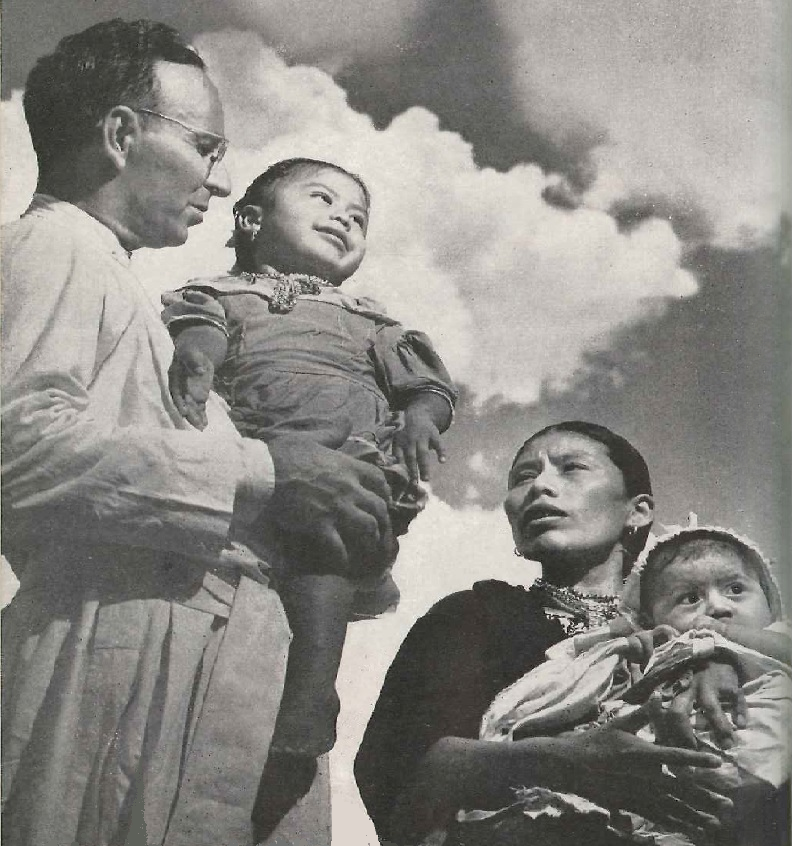
Ulrich with Maya

The village was founded in 1883 by Maya fleeing persecution in Guatemala. This was a part of a larger migration which also included Q’eqchi’ from Alta Verpaz who settled further south in the Crique Sarco, Dolores, and later Sarstoon, Temash, and Moho River areas.

Economic development came to San Antonio in the early 1950s with the founding of a credit union and cooperative that enabled villagers to market their own produce. Fr. William Ulrich, S.J., spearheaded this movement.

San Antonio features several attractions, including San Antonio Falls, a stone church built in 1950, and ecotourism guest houses.

== Demographics ==
At the time of the 2010 census, San Antonio had a population of 1,204. Of these, 94.6% were Mopan Maya, 1.3% Ketchi Maya, 1.3% Mixed, 1.2% Mestizo, 0.4% Yucatec Maya, 0.2% Creole, 0.2% Caucasian, 0.1% Asian, 0.1% Garifuna, 0.1% Mennonite and 0.5% others.
