= Caritas Lawrence =

Sr. Maria Caritas Lawrence is a Sister of Mercy and 2012 recipient of the Order of the British Empire bestowed by Queen Elizabeth, for her lifelong and varied contributions to Belize.

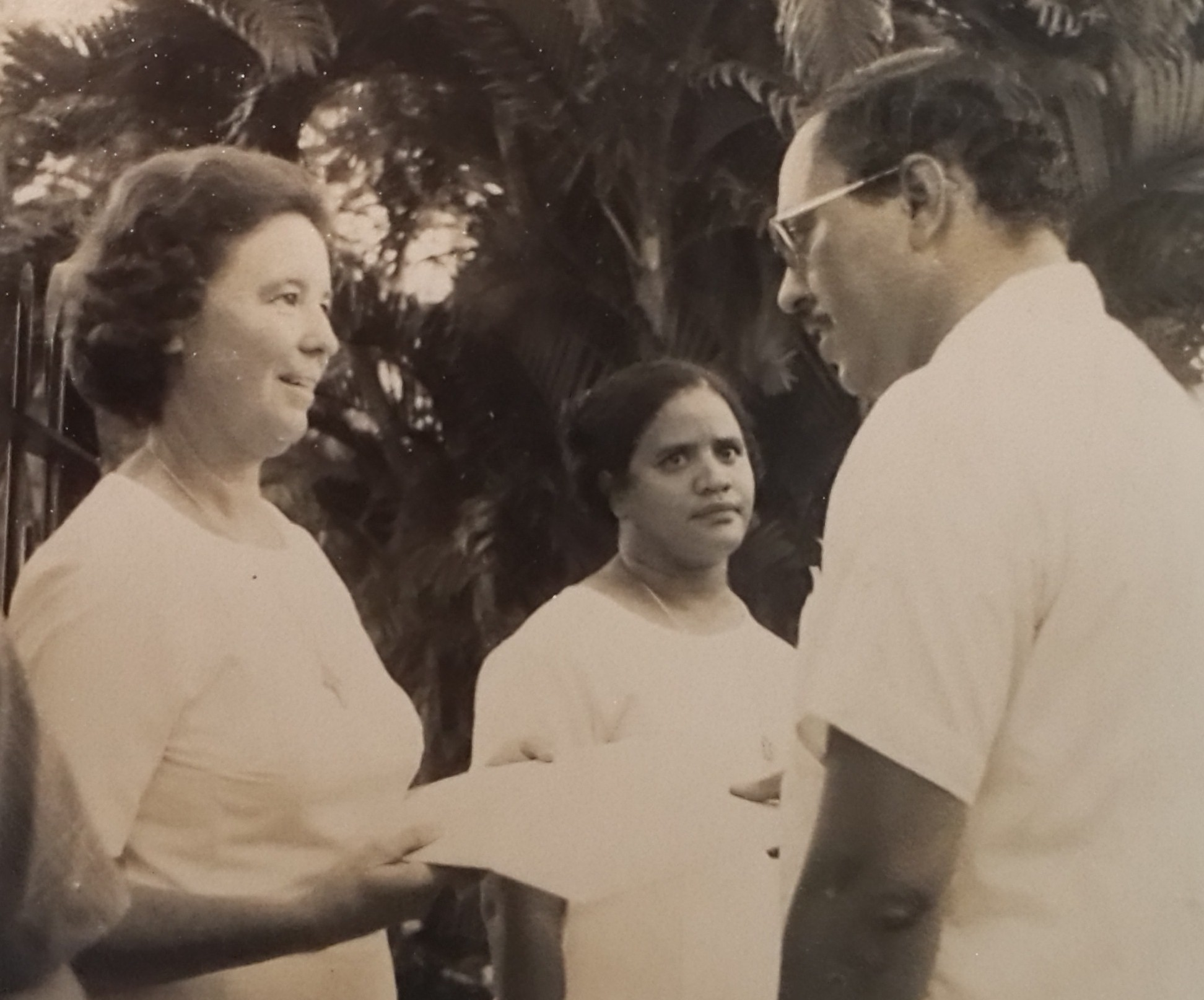

A graduate of St. John's College, Belize, Sister Caritas entered the Mercies and had further studies in the United States. She then taught sociology and philosophy of education at University of Belize from 1968 to 1973, residing in St. Ignatius parish from 1970 to 1973 and directing the choir there. A promoter of women’s issues, she actively supported Sr. Consuelo Torres’ decision to allow girls to remain at St. Catherine Academy after having a child. The photo shows her (center) and Sr. Yvonne Hunter receiving a petition from Charles M. Woods Sr. after a peaceful protest parade in Belize town over this issue.

Maria Caritas went for further studies in the West Indies, returning in 1976 to become principal of San Luis Rey School in rural Toledo. While there she assisted with the translation of the Mass and sacred music into Mayan, and established literacy programs and a high school scholarship fund for the Maya children of the Toledo District. She also served in Canada and at the sisters’ infirmary in Rhode Island. In 1984 she became principal of St. Catherine Academy for 11 years, handing over this position to the first lay principal of SCA in 1995. She went on to serve as a senior officer in the Ministry of Education, resigning in 2015 at the age of 75 but continuing in her prison ministry and church-related works.
