= St. Peter Claver Catholic parish, Belize =

Coordinates: 16°5′48.52″N 88°48′21.57″W

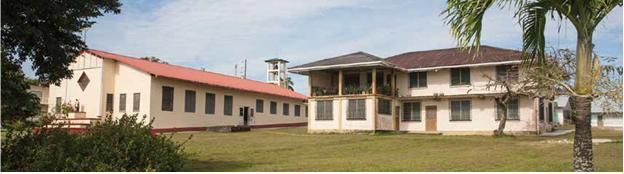
St. Peter Claver church and rectory in Punta Gorda, Belize

St. Peter Claver Catholic parish is located in Punta Gorda, Toledo District, Belize.

== History ==
The Garifuna arrived in Punta Gorda from the coast of Honduras in the late 1700s. They had Catholic roots from their ancestry in Dominica. In 1862 the first Catholic church among the Garifuna of British Honduras/Belize was built in Punta Gorda by Belgian Jesuit Fr. John Genon. From Punta Gorda he served the missions along the coast from Redcliff (Barranco) to Stann Creek Town.

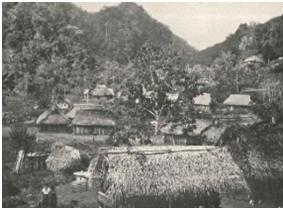
Sarstoon Keckchi Mayan Village

After Genon's death in 1878, Punta Gorda became a mission visited every other month. In 1883 Q'eqchi' Maya from Cobán, Alta Verapaz, Guatemala, settled in Crique Sarco and Dolores near Punta Gorda. A count of the population in the Toledo District in the 1890s reported around 3700 of whom 3249 were Catholic. School populations included Punta Gorda 100, Barranco 50, Monkey River Town 40, Sarstoon 90, and San Antonio 120.

Many of the Q'eqchi' from Coban worked as laborers on the German-owned Cramer Estates in Temash and Sarstoon (at left). With World War I the Cramers were forced to close but most Maya remained in the Sarstoon, Temash, and Moho River areas. Jesuit Fr. Herman J. Tenk was pastor of Punta Gorda and this large mission area from 1913 to 1938. To him is attributed the tradition of Garifuna teachers in the schools, as he fostered their education and employment.

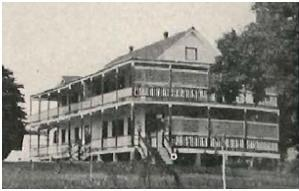
Pallottine convent at Nazareth

In 1931 the Pallottine sisters built Nazareth, their Belizean novitiate (pictured at right), at Fairview, four miles northwest of Punta Gorda. They have been active in the Maya villages of Toledo District and have admitted 72 Belizeans into their numbers.

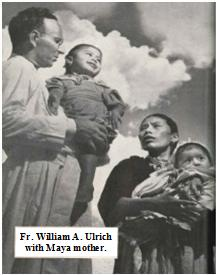

In 1942 Jesuit Fr. Marion M. Ganey became pastor in Punta Gorda and in 1943 established St. Peter Claver Credit Union, the first of many credit unions and cooperatives he would help initiate throughout Belize and later in the Fiji Islands and South Pacific. In 1961 a secondary school was opened at St. Peter Claver but had to close in around 1980. In 1970 the present church was built. Today It features both Garifuna and Q’eqchi’ choirs.

The parish remains the hub serving 30 Maya mission stations, each with its own Catholic-run, government-subsidized grade school. In 2015 St. Peter Claver along with St. Martin de Porres in Belize City were the two parishes in Belize still pastored by members of the Society of Jesus (Jesuits).

== Additional pictures ==
- By St.Louis Post Dispatch c. 1915, mostly Toledo District

== See also ==
- List of Jesuit sites
