= Billy Barquedier National Park =

National park in Belize

- IUCN category II (national park)
- Location within Belize
- Location: Hummingbird Highway, Stann Creek District
- Coordinates: 17°0′N 88°26′W
- Area: 1,639 acres (6.63 km^{2})
- Established: 2001
- Governing body: Steadfast Tourism and Conservation Association
- Website: http://billybarquedier.org/

The Billy Barquedier National Park is a national park in Belize, located between 16.5–19 miles on the Hummingbird Highway in Stann Creek District, south of Belize City. It is located between the Mullins River and Stann Creek watersheds.

The national park consists of approximately 1,500 acres of conserved tropic forest, sitting on the Santa Rosa metasedimentary rock. Billy Barquedier was declared a national park in 2001 and is still in its infancy. Since its founding, the park has been managed by Steadfast Tourism and Conservation Association (STACA) along with the Forestry Department of Belize. The park consists of protected habitat and a hiking trail that leads to the Barquedier waterfall. The waterfall is the park's main tourist attraction, as well as the main supply of water to the three surrounding villages.

== History ==
The area that would later become Billy Barquedier National Park was named in the early 1960s, as the Billy Barquedier creek runs through it. The creek is so named in part for a nearby barquedier (also spelled barquadier or barcadere), a structure similar to a pier. The origin of the name "Billy", however, is unknown.

Attempts to conserve the area began in 1994, when the park became the main source of potable water for the communities of Steadfast, Alta Vista, and Valley Community, and STACA formed with the goal of protecting the watershed and its wildlife. In April 2001, STACA was included in chapter 206 of the laws of Belize and in December of that year, the forest was declared a national park. STACA was later, in 2003, declared a non-governmental organization (NGO). The organization has taken responsibility for the maintenance of the park since its founding, advocating for the growth and protection of the park, as well as for the rights and interests of the communities that rely on it.

== Biodiversity ==
BBNP is home to a diverse array of wildlife. It is said to be a prime birdwatching destination, offering views of various species of migratory birds and other endemics such as the keel-billed motmot and cerulean warbler. Other species often seen from the park's hiking trails are gibnuts, howler monkeys, jaguars, and tapirs, Belize's national animal.

== New River conflict ==
In October 2010, an Environmental impact assessment (EIA) was submitted by New River Enterprises of Orange Walk Town, for the upgrade of approximately 2.8 miles of road beginning just outside and leading into the park. The upgrade was intended to improve access to a logging concession owned by New River, which borders the park along the Mullins River. This is in line with a general trend of increased logging in the area, impacting not only corporate-owned land, but public areas such as national parks and human settlements. STACA and residents of the three surrounding communities felt that the construction and the finished project would negatively impact the park and surrounding villages by increasing the risk of landslides, mudslides, and flooding, and threatening the villages' only source of clean water.

As a result, STACA and locals protested against the project, holding local meetings in order to discuss methods by which to express their views to New River and the national government, and appearing at the National Environmental Appraisal Committee's (NEAC) investigation of the site. Executive director of STACA, Hyacinth Ysaguirre, stated, "They want to cut down the hills from 90 degrees of slope to 8 degrees and move material that they know [is] friable ... and then when that all washes out, it's right into our water system. Then what are we going to drink?" A resident expressed similar concerns: "We don't want any logging because if they log in our water shed then that will affect our water and then all of us will get sick and we will can't use the water [sic]."

Whether protests were successful is unclear.

== Local impact ==
The park provides running water for three nearby villages: Steadfast, Valley Community and Alta Vista. It's the villagers' primary source of water for drinking, cooking, washing, bathing and other daily activities, which has influenced residents' support for the park. Additionally, the water is used by farmers for crop irrigation and livestock.

The maintenance of the park is, as a result, considered important to the continuing health and prosperity of these communities, as many similar areas have been impacted by logging and other industries. Residents of the village of Steadfast have stated that they worry about the impact of logging projects such as that undertaken by New River on their water supply and on the broader health of their communities.
