= Holy Redeemer Primary School =

Primary school in Belize

Coordinates: 17°29′48.38″N 88°11′14.24″W

Holy Redeemer Primary School is a Catholic, parish primary school located in the heart of Belize City, Belize.

== History ==
Located at the Cathedral parish in Belize City, it began operation in 1869. In 1883 the Sisters of Mercy arrived in Belize and made the running of this school their first task. At that time there were more part-Spanish Mestizo children in the school, refugees from the Caste War of Yucatán, than there were Creole children. It has always been one of the largest schools in Belize, located in the heart of old Belize Town.

== Alumni ==
Noted alumni include Antonio Soberanis Gómez, an activist in the Belizean labour movement, George Price, first prime minister of Belize, and politician Jorge Espat, former Minister of National Security and Economic Development and president of St. John's College.
