= St. Martin de Porres Church, Belize City =

Roman Catholic Parish

Coordinates: 17°29′56.02″N 88°12′2.94″W

St. Martin de Porres Catholic Church is a parish of the Roman Catholic Church on the southwest side of Belize City, Belize.

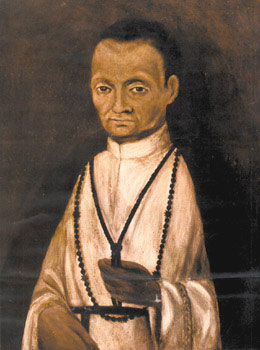
St. Martin de Porres

== Foundation ==
In 1968 Jesuit Fr. Bill Messmer, pastor of St. Ignatius Church in South Belize City, opened a school to accommodate students in the west part of his parish. Another Jesuit, Fr. Thomas Thro, began celebrating Mass in homes in the area and in 1971 construction began on a building to accommodate a church on the ground floor and rectory above, the beginning of St. Martin de Porres parish. St. Martin was chosen as the church’s patron because of his lifelong care for the poor.

== Development ==
By 2015 parish grounds covered a square block and included a new church, with the original building housing the parish office and Jesuit residence. There is also a day care center, three school buildings housing pre-school through eighth grade accommodating 825 students, a soccer field, and a basketball court. Community service programs include Hand in Hand Ministries of Belize, which has built hundreds of homes for those in need, and the Society of St. Vincent de Paul program with its Drop-In Center for seniors and its Outreach Center to feed the hungry and serve the youth of the southwest side. Further programs include Project Heal counselling and remedial learning program and Centre for Community Resource Development. Mercy Clinic began at St. Martin's but moved to a new residence off Coney Drive.

In 2012, Belize City had the fourth-highest homicide rate in the world, 113/100,000 annually. The people of de Porres parish work together to respond to the problems of poverty and unemployment, and the ensuant crime, in the southwest part of Belize City. They enjoy the support of two sister parishes in the United States, St. Francis Xavier in Kansas City, Missouri, and Good Shepherd in Frankfort, Kentucky, as well as partnerships and student immersion trips. Along with St. Peter Claver church in Punta Gorda, St. Martin's remains one of two parishes in Belize still pastored by the Society of Jesus (Jesuits).

In 2011 Fr. Matt Ruhl, S.J., became pastor, succeeding Fr. Jack Stochl, a Jesuit from the United States who labored in Belize for 60 years and became a naturalized citizen of Belize. Ruhl also took over the morning devotion slot on Radio Belize which Stochl had covered for 34 years.

== See also ==
- List of Jesuit sites
