= Carolyn Gentle-Genitty =

American academic

Dr. Carolyn Gentle-Genitty
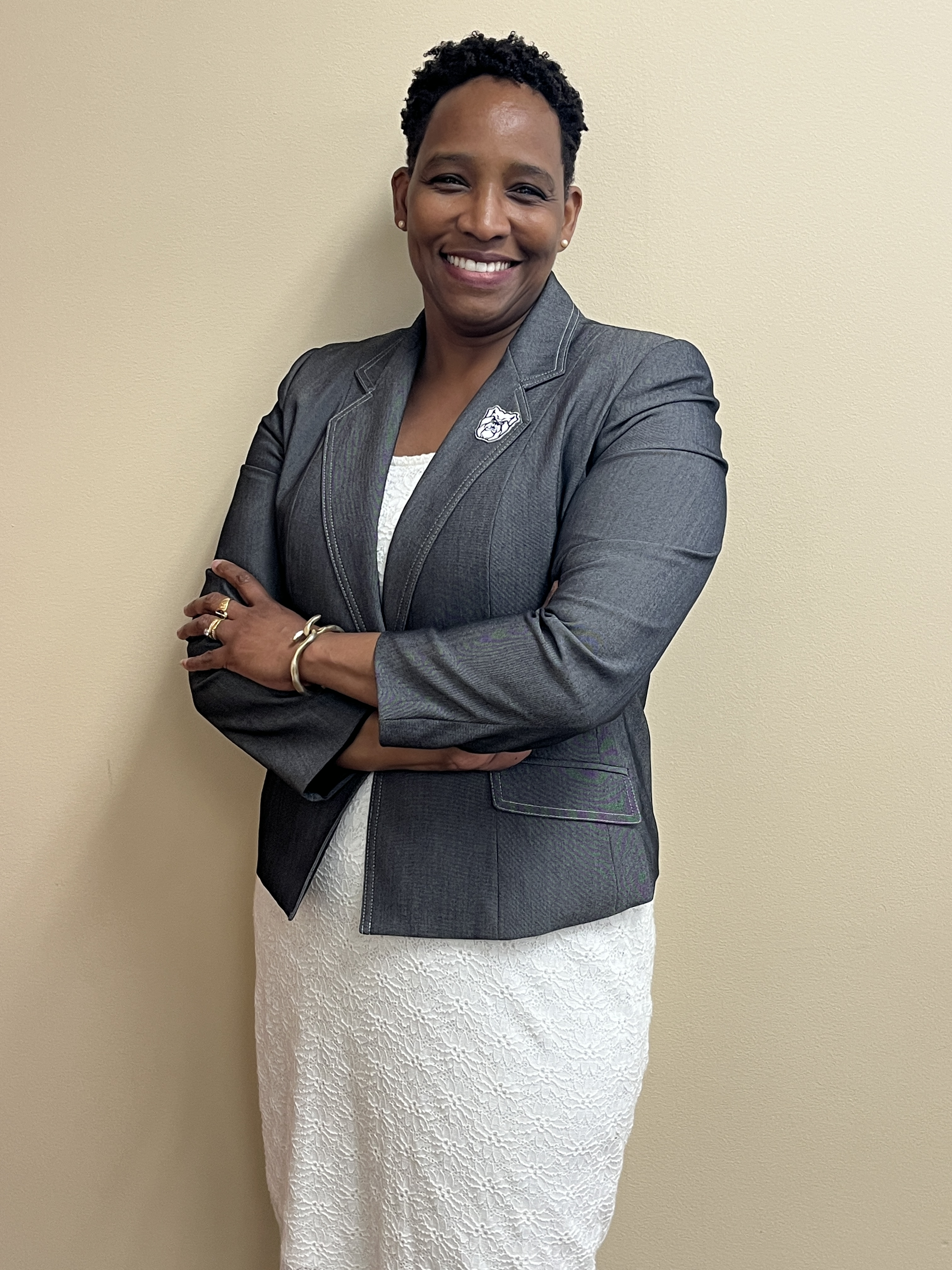
- Gentle-Genitty in May of 2024
- Born: Belize
- Occupations: Academic; Author

Academic background
- Education: St John's College Junior College (A.A) Spalding University (B.S, M.S) Indiana University (PhD)
- Alma mater: Spalding University, Indiana University
- Thesis: Impact of Schools' Social Bonding on Chronic Truancy: Perceptions of Middle School Principals (2009)

Academic work
- Discipline: Social Work
- Main interests: teaching effectiveness, theory application, online learning, millennial, and student engagement, school-to-prison pipeline, school competence, truancy and social bonding

Carolyn Gentle-Genitty is an American academic, writer and youth development consultant. A professor of social work, teaching both theory and practice at the Bachelors and Masters level, in Indianapolis, where she was appointed as the inaugural dean of Founder's College at Butler University.

== Early life and education ==
Gentle-Genitty was born to Belizean parents and grew up in Belize. She is the oldest of five children. Her parents ran a food cart and canteen. As a grade school student, she prioritized leadership opportunities such as student government and the Belizean government's youth service department. For high school, she applied and was accepted to an all girls private school. This high school was considered the best high school in Belize. Her father pedaled a bycicle cart to afford the weekly tuition payments, in spite of the financial hardships they faced.

In 1996, she earned her associate degree in General Studies from St John's College Junior College, while holding a work-study position to pay tuition. She was awarded the Bachelor of Science in Social Work in 1998, followed by the Master of Science in Social Work in 1999 from Spalding University in Louisville, Kentucky. In 2004, she relocated to Indianapolis and began her doctoral studies. In 2008, she received her Ph.D. in Social Work with a minor in Criminal Justice from Indiana University.

== Career ==
After serving as the executive director of YMCA Belize, teaching at the University of Belize, and working with nonprofits, Gentle-Genitty moved to Indianapolis to pursue a Ph.D. in Social Work. After completing her degree, she was hired by Indiana University–Purdue University Indianapolis (IUPUI) as a faculty member and led the School of Social Work's undergraduate degree programs.

During her time at IUPUI she held many leadership positions at the campus and for the Indiana University system. In her work, she developed online education programs and improved transfer policies. In July 2017, she was appointed as assistant vice president for university academic policy in the Office of the Executive Vice President for University Academic Affairs. She also served the director of the University Transfer Office. In this role, Gentle-Genitty was responsible for over 25 initiatives, including the assessment of feeder schools, credit decision making, and providing policy guidance documents for standard operating processes.

In June 2022, she stepped down from her role as the director of the University Transfer Office, but continued to serve as the Assistant Vice President for University Academic Policy and Liaison to the Indiana Commission for Higher Education. The following year, she was accepted into the 2023 cohort of American Council on Education Fellows program. In April 2023, she was promoted to full professor at Indiana University.

She ended term as the Chief Education Officer, Lead Consultant, and Founder at Pivot Attendance Solutions. She is the CEO and Founder of Attendance USA at attendanceusa.org.

In April 2024, Butler University announced Gentle-Genitty as the inaugural dean of their new two year Founder's College. She joined the college on June 3, 2024. In her first year, she was tasked to develop the school's infrastructure while hiring faculty and staff.

== Research and public scholarship ==
Gentle-Genitty's research explores the school attendance and truancy. In a 2008 study, she found that middle school students in Indiana missed school because the parents expected the schools to address absenteeism while the schools expected the parents to address the issue. Her approach to research often includes engagement with community partners and educators to identify and test solutions to issues. For example, in 2014 she worked with a school social worker to develop an international award-winning program to help educators foster positive student behaviors. Similarly, her work with the Warren Township schools to used community-based research methods to improve student success. For this research, Gentle-Genitty received The Charles R. Bantz Chancellor's Community Scholar Award in 2017.

Gentle-Genitty's research takes a holistic approach to understanding and addressing student attendance and behavior issues. After the Indianapolis prosecutor proposed adult-court for the parents of truant students, she observed that a singular focus on parents would be unlikely to improve attendance. Similarly, when the Indiana state legislature explored approaches to further enforce school attendance, Gentle-Genitty encouraged lawmakers to consider the range of reasons that a student might be absent from school, including "school withdrawal" (such as for appointments) and "school refusal" (for bullying and mental health issues). Following revisions to the proposed legislation, Gentle-Genitty reiterated support for approaches that support accountability while not emphasizing punitive measures and criminalization.

Her research of truancy led her development of the Perception of School Social Bonding instrument (PSSB). It is the first assessment of its kind that measures any gaps in school social bonding that may impact truancy. In addition to her research, she served as the president and editor for International Association for Truancy and Dropout Prevention (IATDP).

== Selected publications ==
- Gentle-Genitty, C. S., Gregory, V., Pfahler, C., Thomas, M., Lewis, L., Campbell, K., Ballard, K., Compton, K., & Daley, J. G. (2007). A Critical Review of Theory in Social Work Journals: A Replication Study. Advances in Social Work, 8(1). DOI: 10.18060/132
- Gentle-Genitty, C. (2009). Best Practice Program for Low-Income African American Students Transitioning from Middle to High School. Children & Schools, 31(2), 109–117. DOI: 10.1093/cs/31.2.109
- Gentle-Genitty, C., Haiping Chen, Karikari, I., & Barnett, C. (2014). Social Work Theory and Application to Practice: The Students’ Perspectives. Journal of Higher Education Theory & Practice, 14(1), 36–47.
- Gentle-Genitty, C., Karikari, I., Chen, H., & Wilka, E. (2016). Truancy: A look at definitions in the USA and other territories. In K. Reid (Ed.), Managing and Improving School Attendance and Behaviour. Routledge.
- Gentle-Genitty, C., Kim, J., Yi, E.-H., Slater, D., Reynolds, B., & Bragg, N. (2017). Comprehensive assessment of youth violence in five Caribbean countries: Gender and age differences. Journal of Human Behavior in the Social Environment, 27(7), 745–759. DOI: 10.1080/10911359.2016.1273811
- Gentle-Genitty, C., Renguette, C., eds. (2018). Gender Violence: Prevalence, Implications, and Global Perspectives. Nova Science Publishers. ISBN 9-781-53613610-4, 1-536-13610-7
- Kim, J., & Gentle-Genitty, C. (2020). Transformative school–community collaboration as a positive school climate to prevent school absenteeism. Journal of Community Psychology, 48(8), 2678–2691. DOI: 10.1002/jcop.22444
- Gentle-Genitty, C., Merrit, B., & Kimble-Hill, A. C. (2021). A Model for Crafting Diversity, Inclusion, Respect, and Equity (DIRE) Policy Statements Toward Catalyzing Organizational Change. ACS Central Science, 7(3), 383–391. DOI: 10.1021/acscentsci.0c01533
- Gentle-Genitty, C. (2023). Teaching testable explanations and putting them into practice. In M. Arnold (Ed.), Handbook of Applied Teaching and Learning in Social Work Management Education: Theories, Methods, and Practices in Higher Education (pp. 207–218). Springer Nature.

== Selected awards ==
- 2021 Building Bridges Award, Indiana University
- 2018 Inspirational Woman Award, IUPUI Office for Women
- 2017 Joseph T. Taylor Excellence in Diversity Award, IUPUI
- 2017 Charles R. Bantz Chancellor's Community Scholar Award, Grant Recipient 2017, IUPUI
- National Academic Advising Association (NACADA), Outstanding Advising Award, Certificate of Merit in Faculty Advising, 2015
