= Salvatore di Pietro =

Italian Bishop in the Roman Catholic Church

The Most Reverend Salvatore di Pietro
- Vicar Apostolic of Belize
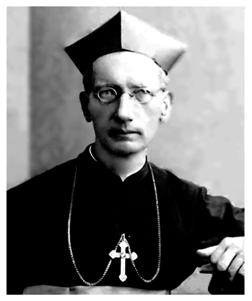
- Church: Catholic Church
- Appointed: 14 January 1893
- In office: 16 April 1893 – 23 August 1898
- Successor: Frederick Hopkins

Orders
- Ordination: 2 June 1859
- Consecration: 16 April 1893 by Thomas A. Becker

Personal details
- Born: 15 June 1830 Palermo, Italy
- Died: 23 August 1898 (aged 68) Belize

Salvatore di Pietro (15 June 1830 – 23 August 1898) was an Italian Bishop in the Catholic Church. He served as the first Vicar Apostolic of Belize from 1893 to 1898. He is widely regarded as the most important figure in consolidating the Catholic presence in Belize in the second half of the 19th century.

== Missionary to Central America ==
Salvatore di Pietro was born in Palermo, Italy, on 15 June 1830. He entered the Society of Jesus (Jesuits) in October 1845 and was ordained a priest on 2 June 1859. He arrived in British Honduras (now known as "Belize") on 22 March 1869. On May 12 he suffered an attack of yellow fever. His superiors transferred him to Guatemala, where he preached missions to the Garifuna. He was appointed head of the missions in northern Guatemala, but along with 80 other Jesuits fled the country in September 1871 when the Liberals gained control and persecuted the Catholic Church. In 1872 president Jose Maria Medina invited him to Spanish Honduras to found a college in the capital Comayagua. He began by preaching missions in Omoa and San Pedro Sula. However, the Liberals took control of Spanish Honduras also and he returned to Belize.

== Mission superior ==
In 1851 Jesuits had been placed in charge of the Catholic mission in Belize, with George Avvaro serving as first Superior in 1853. In September 1872 di Pietro was appointed to replace the aging Avvaro. But in October 1874 di Pietro needed relief and John Pittar was made Superior. Di Pietro became pastor in Corozal in the north of Belize until June 1876 when, weak from sickness, he was sent to Panama to recover his strength. He served as secretary to the Bishop of Panama. By October 1878 Pittar was having serious health problems and di Pietro returned to be Superior, remaining so until his death in 1898. The Superior resided at Holy Redeemer parish in Belize Town. From his close association with Henry Fowler, the first Catholic colonial administrator (1877–1886), keeper of the government records and producer of the Honduras Almanack, di Pietro wrote accounts to acquaint his Superiors in England with Belize and to attract assistance of funds and manpower.

Under di Pietro's watch, Cassian Gillett founded at Holy Redeemer St. John's College, which would educate many future leaders for Belize and neighboring republics. Also, di Pietro was the impetus for bringing to Belize three congregations of religious sisters. The Sisters of Mercy were the first to arrive. After his visit to the motherhouse in New Orleans in 1892, the Sisters of Mercy began arriving in Belize. On the event Pope Leo XIII sent a special blessing for this first establishment of congregation in the tropics. Next the Holy Family Sisters arrived in 1898. These African-American sisters, founded by Henriette DeLille, came to manage the school in the Garifuna settlement of Dangriga. The third religious community of sisters to arrive in Belize were the Carmelites. The Church in the northern districts was well-established and Bishop di Pietro was anxious about the education of the children there. In 1899, four sisters of the Third Order of Mount Carmel in New Orleans came to serve in Orange Walk.

== Prefect Apostolic, Vicar, and first Bishop for Belize ==
di Pietro with Hopkins to his right and Cassian Gillett in rear 3rd from left

In 1879 the direct route by steamship from Jamaica to Belize ended, complicating travel for the Vicar Apostolic in Jamaica to reach Belize. In the absence of the Vicar, the mission superior di Pietro administered Confirmation within the Colony. In his visit to Rome in 1888, di Pietro proposed that because of the great distance between Jamaica and Belize (750 miles), the Congregation for the Evangelization of Peoples in Rome make Belize a Prefecture independent of Jamaica. Those in Rome concurred and he was made Prefect Apostolic on 10 June 1888. Then on 14 January 1893 the Roman authorities appointed di Pietro titular Bishop of Eurea and Vicar-Apostolic of British Honduras. The consecration took place in Belize on 16 April 1893 with Bishop Thomas A. Becker of Savannah, Georgia, as consecrator, assisted by Bishop Jeremiah O'Sullivan of Mobile, Alabama, and Bishop Thomas Heslin of Natchez, Mississippi.

In the following year responsibility for the Belize mission was transferred from the English Province to the Missouri Province of Jesuits. The mission which began in 1852 with no church, few Catholics, and 2 priests after 40 years numbered 20,000 Catholics among a population of 31,000 inhabitants, in 6 town churches – Belize Town, Corozal, Orange Walk, Stann Creek, Punta Gorda, and El Cayo – and 39 outstation chapels. Bishop di Pietro died from a heart condition on 23 August 1898 and was succeeded by Bishop Frederick C. Hopkins, S.J.
