= Marion M. Ganey =

Missionary and promoter of credit union movements

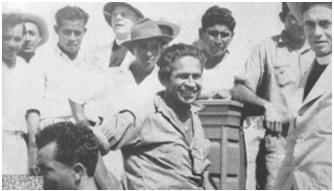

Fr. Marion M. Ganey, S.J., (1904–1984) was an American Catholic priest, member of the Society of Jesus (Jesuits), and missionary to British Honduras, Central America, from 1937 to 1953, where he was instigator of the credit union and cooperatives movement. He became increasingly prominent in this movement, being invited to the Fiji Islands in 1953 and laboring to establish the movement there and throughout the South Pacific until his death in Fiji in 1984.

== Early life ==
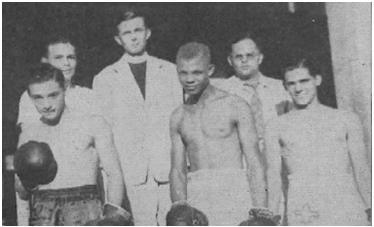

Marion M. Ganey was born July 21, 1904, and entered the Society of Jesus on August 7, 1922. He studied for the priesthood at St. Louis University divinity school in St. Marys, Kansas, and was ordained in 1935. After a year of spiritual studies he arrived in British Honduras (Belize) in 1937. As assistant pastor at Holy Redeemer Cathedral in Belize City, he organized youth clubs and Golden Gloves boxing tournaments. Direct contact with the poor, along with the social encyclicals of Popes Pius XI and Leo XIII, launched Ganey on his career of founding credit unions and cooperatives. In his time at Holy Redeemer Cathedral, Ganey would fill the hall with "a thousand young men." To found the credit union at Holy Redeemer, Ganey relied on a fellow Jesuit Fr. Henry Sutti, who grew up at Fr. Flanagan's Boys Town in Nebraska. Bishop Dorick M. Wright, in his preface to the history of the Catholic church in Belize, calls "the credit union and cooperative movements stalwart pillars in the country's economic development."

== Punta Gorda ==
In 1942 Ganey became pastor in Punta Gorda in the south of Belize. There he established the St. Peter Claver Credit Union in 1943. He then traveled from one village to another throughout the country preaching the Church's social doctrine and its relation to the establishment of credit unions and cooperatives. He conferred with authorities in the U.S. and Nova Scotia on methods to improve cooperatives in Central America. He also taught the people agricultural practices that would produce a better yield on their plantations and he greatly enlarged the market for their produce. For that he enlisted two alumni of St. John's College: "Buster" Hunter used his two mail boats to carry produce from Punta Gorda to Belize City, where Edgar Gegg would sell it. From this beginning the cooperative began. Meanwhile, the Pallotine Sisters in Punta Gorda were teaching the girls weaving, and how to cook and preserve produce: "The domestic detail of the Cooperative is in the hands of the Sisters." What Ganey had begun soon inspired community-conscious leaders of all denominations throughout Belize to form credit unions. Jesuit Fr. Joseph Wade described the necessary steps in forming a co-op: study club, credit union, co-op. As he wrote, "a very timid-faced little co-op is moving shyly about my village" in Orange Walk.

== Growing movement ==
Bishop William A. Rice had encouraged Ganey in his efforts. His successor, Bishop David Francis Hickey, showed strong support also. Eight Jesuits were sent to the World Institute of Cooperatives in St. Louis to learn this aspect of missiology and Fr. William Moore, S.J., was assigned to full-time work in the cooperative movement. Moore became the first president of the Belize Credit Union League, while the Belizean government opened a special department of cooperatives and sent civil servants abroad for further study of the movement. Credit unions and cooperatives remain important elements in the national economy of Belize. In the latter part of the 1950s, two foreign-owned companies were purchasing lobster tails from Belizean fishermen at 40 cents a pound and whole lobsters at 16 cents a pound, then exporting them to the United States where they sold them for $2.40 per pound. In the early 1960s, some local fishermen established their own fish processing plant and marketing operation. The new operation, although inefficient, immediately realized significant savings, enabling the fishermen to double their income. Ganey wrote of his experience with empowerment: "During my ten years in British Honduras, experience has taught me, if nothing else, the great fact that I should not try to dominate the movement. This applies as well to my years of action in the Fiji Islands. It is a difficult lesson to learn and I learned by many mistakes. We hurt the people and the movement if we figure too positively in the program."

== Fiji and South Pacific islands ==
Ganey's departure from Belize was at the instigation of Sir Ronald Garvey KCMG, who had served in the Fiji Islands before coming to Belize and felt that Ganey could do wonders for Fiji with cooperatives and credit unions. He convinced the Jesuit superior to send Ganey to the Pacific islands of Fiji and Samoa, where he spent the rest of his life. Ganey established the first credit union in Fiji in January 1954 and by July of the same year established the Credit Union Ordinance which later became the Fiji Credit Union Act, impacting also Tonga and Samoa where Ganey extended his work. He organised insurance underwriting for the Pacific credit unions through CUNA Mutual Group and developed the Bergengren Credit Union Training Centre in 1964, at the same time contributing to the formation of the South Pacific Association of Credit Union Leagues. Fiji, at its height, had a total of 39 credit unions with some 8,600 members. In 1961, Fr. Marion Ganey was invited to New Zealand to lead a seminar on the importance of a united credit union movement. Way before mobile banking became popular there was a mobile credit union, operating out the back of a Land Rover. The visit by Ganey and his executives was usually followed by feasting and celebrations. Ganey died in Fiji in 1984 and was gladly accorded his wish of being buried at the parish there. "Every year we celebrate the day he died like we're celebrating the life of a saint," a villager said. Komave villagers from around the world returned to the village to celebrate the life of Fr. Ganey. "At that time the whole village would come together to celebrate mass and also prepare a feast in his honour." He made Fiji his home and final resting place but only after he gained a place among them as a member of the Mataqali (clan) Waqanitabua. He visited Belize in 1969 and spoke at the 25th anniversary of the Holy Redeemer Credit Union. And when in 1977 the bishop blessed a US$1,250,000 addition to the Northern Fishermen Cooperative building, Ganey was invited to speak. This was his final trip to Belize. Recounting this occasion, as well as his death seven years later, The Christian Herald wrote: "The tall, lanky figure of Fr. Ganey was everywhere, advising, encouraging, giving of his talents to engineer the success of this economic effort that affected the root people."

== Links to history of credit unions ==
The German economist Franz Hermann Schulze-Delitzsch is credited with founding the world's first credit union in Delitzsch in the Free State of Saxony in Germany in 1850. In 1846 when crop failure and famine struck Germany he organised a mill and bakery cooperative and a "people's bank" that provided credit to farmers. By the 1890s they had spread through most of Europe and to India. In 1901, after much correspondence with European founders, Gabriel-Alphonse Desjardins founded the first credit union in Quebec, the forerunner of current North American credit unions. In 1908 he helped a group of French American Catholics organise the first credit union in the United States at Ste. Marie Church, Manchester, New Hampshire. The U.S. credit union movement became increasingly popular in the 1920s economy when Edward Filene, a wealthy Bostonian, hired Roy Bergengren to promote the cause in the U.S. and abroad. The movement grew to more than 7,000 credit unions in the U. S. representing 100 million members. Unlike the credit unions of Germany or Quebec, most in the U.S. emerged from an employer-based bond of association. In addition to the traditional information and enforcement advantages resulting from the fact that members shared the same workplace, the employer-based bond permitted credit unions to use future paychecks as collateral. In 1954 the World Extension Department was created to give international direct assistance to credit unions, often in collaboration with government programs. A World Council of Credit Unions was created in 1971 and it now represents 97 national credit union movements with more than 172 million credit union members.
