= Edward J. O'Donnell (academic administrator) =

Edward J. O'Donnell (May 11, 1909, in Milwaukee – 1986) was the president of Marquette University from 1948 to 1962.

== Biography ==
He was the eldest of seven children. O'Donnell grew up in the Tory Hill neighborhood and attended Gesu Catholic School. He entered the academy in 1923 with plans to become an attorney. O'Donnell graduated from Marquette University in 1931. That same year he entered the Jesuit order. After his studies, he taught and worked in the missions of Central America and was ordained in 1942.

Upon the sudden death of Fr. Peter Brooks, S.J., O'Donnell returned in 1948 to become Marquette's president, making him the university's youngest President. He served until 1962. During his tenure, Marquette advanced its reputation as one of the leading Catholic universities in America. Enrollment more than doubled to 12,000 students, while the campus expanded significantly. The "Greater Marquette Campaign" featured both capital and program priorities. O'Donnell initiated the construction of several important campus buildings dedicated to the instruction and housing of undergraduates. These buildings included the Business Administration school building (1951), the Memorial Library (1953) and the Brooks Memorial Union (1953). The Medical and Dental Schools were expanded to meet the needs of the growing interest in the health care fields. In addition, new student housing was constructed to meet the demands of the expanding undergraduate population. In 1952, O'Donnell Hall, Marquette's first all female dormitory opened on the upper campus. Schroeder Hall followed in 1957. Unfortunately, one of the casualties of the building program was the university football team which ceased competition in 1960 due to cost factors.

After his retirement, Fr. O'Donnell assisted Rev. John Raynor, S.J. as the university's chancellor. He retired from that role in 1972. He left Marquette for St. John's College, Belize, where he had led the teacher training program during World War II. While there he concentrated on parish work. Poor health forced him to return to Milwaukee. He died at the Marquette University Jesuit Residence in 1986.
