= Buck Stanton (Jesuit) =

American entomologist

William A. "Buck" Stanton (1870–1909) was an American Jesuit priest and naturalist who was a missionary to British Honduras, today's Belize.

== Naturalist ==
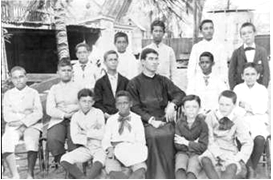
Stanton with St. John's College biology class, 1898

Stanton was the first Jesuit to go from St. Louis to the Belize mission, in 1897. He was a naturalist, contributing specimens of the country's flora to the Smithsonian Institution, and discovering the Asplenium Stantonii Copeland, a fern plant. The Smithsonian also credits him with discovering 67 new varieties of hymenopterous insects, of which one genus and eight species are named after him. While teaching biology at St. John's College, he organized the first field day, beginning a long tradition of sporting events in the Belizean community.

== Priesthood ==
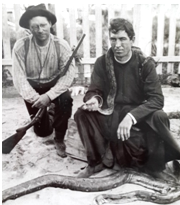
Jesuit priests Joseph Meuffels and William "Buck" Stanton

After two years in Belize, Stanton left for priestly studies and was ordained in the Philippines, during this time helping at the Manila Observatory, which was a part of the Jesuit Ateneo de Manila University. He returned to Belize in 1904 to establish the church at Benque Viejo del Carmen on Belize's Western border with Guatemala. Benque had been a mission station in the heart of Mayan lands, but beginning with Stanton took on permanency. He described the parish in his letters home. "I have eight hundred people here at Benque Viejo. ... Some talk a little Spanish, but most of them Mayan. My district comprises over 30 parishes and I am the only priest." He wrote of battling his way for 40 miles through the bush, about 10 of it on foot with a 50-pound saddle bag after his horse slipped its halter. After Stanton contracted cancer, he returned in 1909 to the United States, where he died at the age of 40.
