= Sacred Heart Junior College =

Coordinates: 17.1620°N 89.0761°W

- Type: Junior college
- Established: 1999
- President: Dr. Eve Aird
- Location: San Ignacio, Belize
- Campus: San Ignacio
- Nickname: Heart
- Website: shjc.edu.bz

Sacred Heart Junior College was established in 1999 to offer tertiary-level education opportunities in the Cayo District, Belize. When it was first established, it offered Network Administration, International Business, Biology, Environmental Science, Computer Science, Marketing and Tourism Management, of which the Tourism Management, Environmental Science, Network Administration and Computer Technician programmes were trailblazing programmes within Belize. Since then, General Studies and Primary School Education programmes have been added.

In 1999, just over 100 students were registered at the school, and in 2007, the number had risen to 500 students.

The motto for the school is "Excellence, Innovation and Productivity".
