= Holy Redeemer Catholic Parish, Belize City =

Coordinates: 17°29′46″N 88°11′13″W

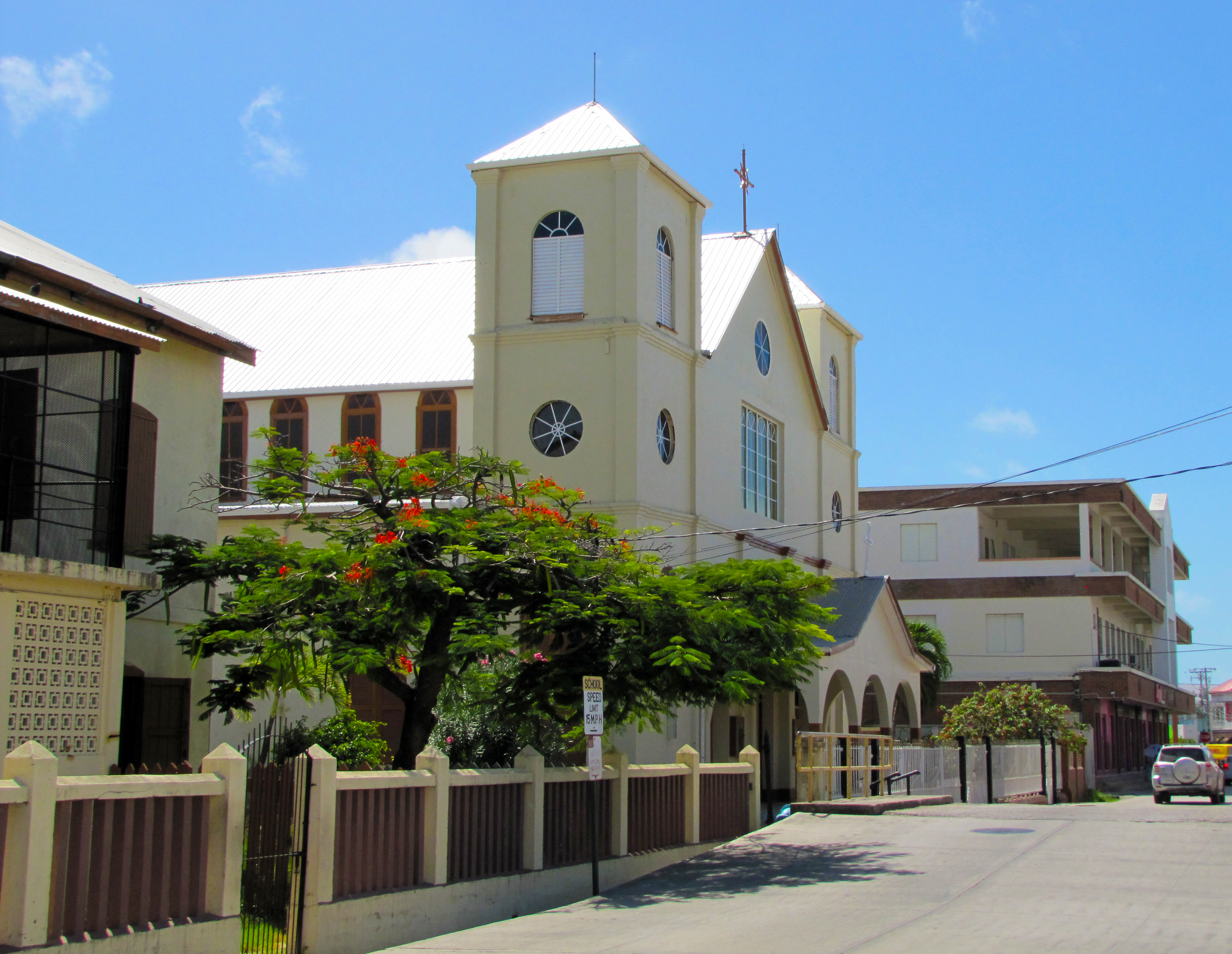
Holy Redeemer Cathedral newly refurbished, with Diocesan Center in background

When the Holy Redeemer Catholic parish was founded in 1852, it was the only parish in Belize and from it missionaries covered the whole country. When other parishes were founded Holy Redeemer remained a parish with its own history but with its leadership connected to the Catholic church in all of Belize under titles of governance that evolved over the years from apostolic prefect to apostolic vicar to bishop. It has remained the hub of the diocese, the bishop's church, as well as a parish in its own right.

== From mid-nineteenth century ==
In the first half of the 19th century, merchants accounted for most of the Catholic presence in Belize Town – several Spaniards, the German Cramer brothers, the Portuguese Melhados, and the Frenchman Richards. But then during the War of the Castes in Yucatan in the 1840s, the Catholic population in northern Belize swelled to about 7,000. This occasioned action by the Jesuits in Jamaica who were over the Vicariate which included Belize. In 1851 Vicar Apostolic James Eustace Du Peyron established a Jesuit presence in Belize Town on the coastline of Central Belize, from which missionaries set out to establish parishes in the North and in all of Belize. (The priests and brothers listed below were all Jesuits except for Facundo Castillo.)

=== Origin ===
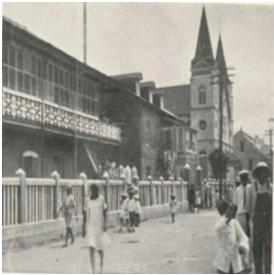
Holy Redeemer cathedral, begun in 1858, with its spires in 1933

In 1852 Fr. Bertolio came to build the first Catholic church in Belize Town, for Holy Redeemer Parish. With him came a schoolmaster Henry Trumbach, whose mother would teach the girls. There were then about 250 Catholics in Belize Town. In 1853 Fr. George Avvaro was appointed the first Jesuit Superior in Belize, serving until 1872. As mission superior residing in Belize Town, he functioned also as pastor of Holy Redeemer parish. On July 17, 1856, fire swept through the north of town destroying the church and rectory. Land was obtained from Belize Estate and Produce Company (BEC) for building a rectory, school, and church. The church and school were of brick, the rectory of wood. The church building, dedicated in 1858, would be enlarged and restored over the next century and become the present Holy Redeemer Cathedral, home to both the parish and the bishop.

=== Salvatore di Pietro ===
Salvatore di Pietro arrived in 1869 along with an Irish school administrator Bro. Mark Quinn who would take charge of Holy Redeemer Primary School. In 1872 di Pietro became superior of the mission and pastor of Holy Redeemer, first as mission superior then as prefect (1888), then as vicar apostolic (1893) with Holy Redeemer as his home parish. In 1879 the Catholic Association was formed in the parish, spreading to the other parishes in Belize. Henry Fowler, the Colonial Secretary, was its first president. It would be responsible for the great pilgrimage of 1890. In 1879 di Pietro also initiated the tradition of Catholic processions around town that in the late 1940s came to include the annual Guadalupe procession for protection against hurricanes.

=== 1880s ===
The Mercy Sisters came to Belize in 1883 and assumed the task of running Holy Redeemer girls’ and boys' primary schools. In 1885 Fr. Henry Gillett began publication of The Angelus, "a Catholic monthly … written partly in English and partly in Spanish." Angelus Press was located in the rectory on North Front Street. In 1887 Henry's brother Fr. Cassian Gillett founded a "Select School" for young men at Holy Redeemer rectory. This would grow into today's St. John's College with its high school, junior college, and extension divisions. It opened with 14 boys in 1887, grew to 35 by 1890, and to 65 by 1896, when it was dedicated to St. John Berchmans and moved to a new building at the back of the parish rectory. It remained there until 1917 when it moved to the spacious Loyola Park campus south of town.

=== 1890s ===
In December 1889 the tradition of church bazaars was inaugurated, as fundraisers. The Governor came to open the three-day bazaar. An 1891 town census indicates that there were 1,200 Catholics in the parish, from a population of about 7,000 in Belize Town. In the 1890s the Catholic Knights of British Honduras was founded. Fr. William Bennett served as pastor of the parish from 1898-1915.

== Twentieth century ==
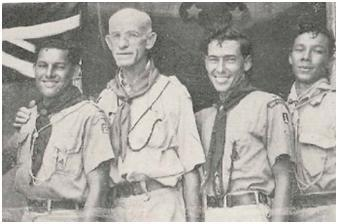
Scoutmaster "Jake"

In 1929 Holy Redeemer Parish Hall (the "Old Barn") became the first multipurpose auditorium in the country, with a fully outfitted stage and an auditorium adaptable for basketball, tennis, and boxing. For 25 years it was the premier venue for indoor events in Belize, until the construction of Bliss Institute in 1955. The parish Catholic Knights began hosting in the hall a banquet for the Knights throughout the country each Ignatius day, July 31. Sodality Chapel Hall was also built in 1929, adjacent to Parish Hall. The Boy Scout movement in Belize was greatly advanced by Brother "Jake" Jacoby in Holy Redeemer parish during his long tenure in Belize, 1928 to 1957. In 1938 Fr. Hugh Harkins started the Drum, Bugle, and Fife Band for the boys of the parish. All of Belize City remained a part of Holy Redeemer parish until St. Ignatius church was built in the south of Belize City in the 1930s.

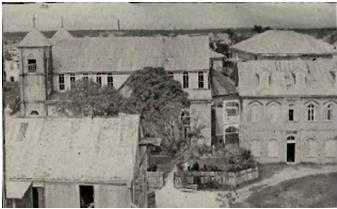
Cathedral and rectory, 1940s

After the 1931 hurricane destroyed the Loyola Park campus of St. John’s College, it moved back to cramped quarters at Holy Redeemer, later moving to a wooden building at the site of the present chancery. In 1952 the college moved to its spacious Landivar campus. In 1954 St. John’s Teacher Training College was established using borrowed classrooms at Holy Redeemer Primary School. A hostel nearby was run for the out-district teachers. The next devastating hurricane to strike the parish was Hattie in 1961. In 1937 Fr. Marion M. Ganey, while assistant pastor at the Cathedral, organized youth clubs and Golden Gloves boxing tournaments, and went on to found the credit union and cooperative movement in Belize. Fr. Henry J. Sutti founded the Holy Redeemer Credit Union (HRCU) in 1944. By 2015 it had reached Bz$501,200,000 in assets, with membership recorded at 50,564. In 1969 Fr. Facundo Castillo became vicar general of the diocese and the first diocesan priest to serve as pastor at Holy Redeemer parish. In 2001 a new diocesan center was built at Holy Redeemer and named Monsignor Facundo Castillo Diocesan Center. The Mercy Sisters of Belize have their motherhouse in the parish, along with a spirituality center and St. Catherine Academy.

== See also ==
- Holy Redeemer Cathedral
- History of Roman Catholicism in Belize

== Sources ==
- Woods, Charles M. Sr., et al. Years of Grace: The History of Roman Catholic Evangelization in Belize: 1524-2014. (Belize: Roman Catholic Diocese of Belize City-Belmopan, 2015) passim, giving remaining references for article.
- "Jesuit Archives Central United States, St. Louis, MO".
