= St. John's College, Belize =

Private religious secondary school and university in Belize

St. John's College
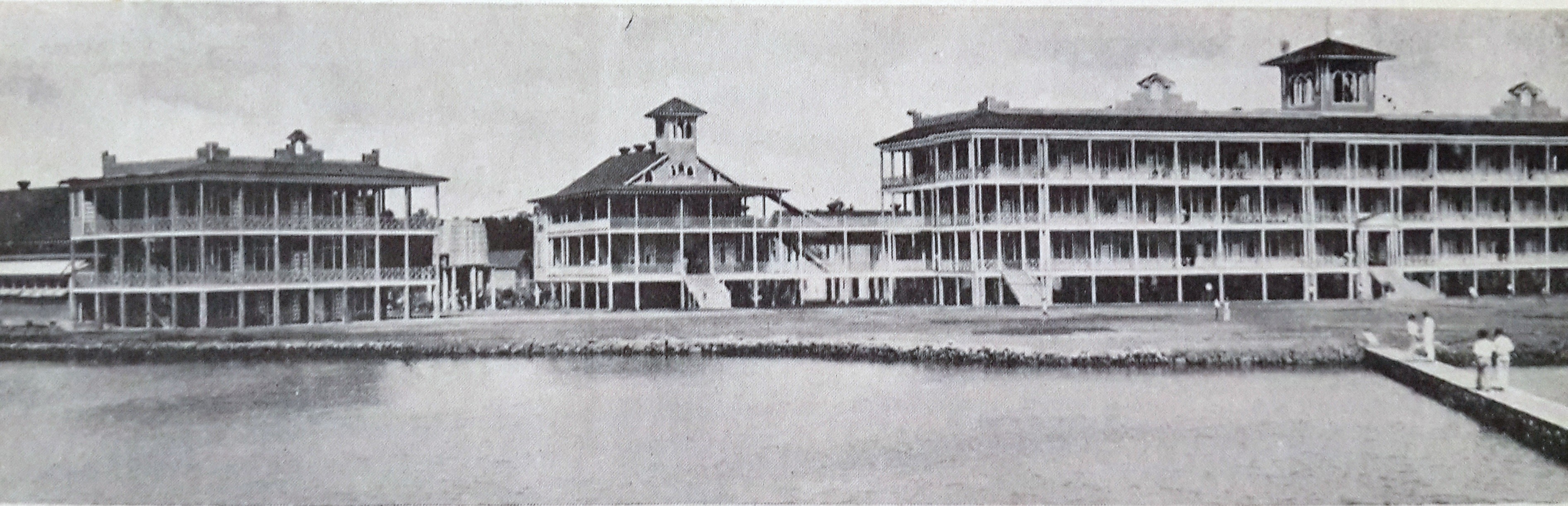
- SJC at Loyola Park
- Former names: St. John Berchmans' College
- Motto: Men and women for and with others
- Type: Private selective secondary school and university college
- Established: January 17, 1887; 139 years ago
- Founders: Fr. Cassian Gillett, S.J.
- Religious affiliation: Catholicism (Jesuit)
- Academic affiliations: Association of Jesuit Colleges and Universities The Association of Tertiary Level Institutions in Belize (ATLIB)
- President: Mirtha Peralta
- Total staff: 150
- Students: 2,267
- Location: Princess Margaret Drive, Belize City, Belize; 17°30′45″N 88°11′55″W
- Campus: Urban
- Patron saint: John Berchmans
- Colors: Navy and white
- Nickname: St. John's, John's, SJC
- Sporting affiliations: ATLIB Sports
- Mascot: Wildcat
- Website: www.sjc.edu.bz

St. John's College (abbreviated as SJC, and locally known as St. John's or John's) is a private Catholic selective secondary school for boys and private co-educational university college, located in Belize City, Belize. Founded in 1887 by the Society of Jesus as St. John Berchmans' College, a high school for boys only, it has since grown and now offers a wide variety of liberal arts and science courses at the secondary, British A-level, and United States junior college levels.

For management purposes, St. John's is organised into three divisions:

- St. John's College High School, Belize (oldest, established 1887)
- St. John's College Junior College (established 1964)
- St. John's College University (established 2023)

Key centres and institutes within the university college are the School of Music, School of Nursing, the Belizean Studies Research Centre, and the MAGIS Center,

== History ==
St. John's College was founded in 1887 with the establishment of the “Select School” for young men at the Catholic presbytery, Holy Redeemer Cathedral in Belize City. The founder of St. John's College was Fr. Cassian Gillett, S.J., one of four British Jesuit priests, who arrived in Belize in the 1880s. The school opened with 12 day-students and two boarders. According to the 1897 prospectus, the school's mission was “to afford the youth of the Colony, and the neighboring Republics, the means of obtaining a solid mental and moral training.” It added that Belize needed “a school of Higher Studies so that our youth would not have to go abroad for preparation for university work.”

The school grew quickly. In February 1896, it moved into a newly constructed building on the cathedral grounds. Its name changed from the Select School to St. John's College, under Fr. William J. Wallace. The enrollment continued to expand and included boarding students from neighboring Central American republics such as Guatemala and Honduras. This steady expansion forced a second move, to seafront land supplied by the government to the south of town. On July 17, 1917, the faculty and students moved into spacious wooden buildings with wide verandahs and windows open to the sea breeze. The campus was called Loyola Park.

More construction followed including a gymnasium and chapel. By 1929 there were 90 students at the college.

August 1921 saw an outbreak of yellow fever at Loyola Park. Day students returned to their homes for hospitalization. Boarding students were first taken to a small island just off the coast, Moho Caye. From there boarders from the rural areas of Belize, Yucatán, and Guatemala returned home but those from Honduras were refused admittance in their country. They were quarantined at Sargent's Caye. Two students and two faculty members died before the fever passed.

On September 11, 1931 one of the worst hurricanes to hit Belize took 2,500 lives including 11 Jesuits at Loyola Park, where the buildings were leveled and splintered. SJC returned to the cathedral grounds where it remained until 1952, when it moved to its spacious new Landivar campus northwest of town.

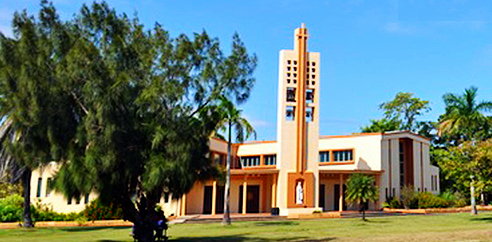

The new campus is named after the Central American poet and renowned scholar Rafael Landivar, S.J. Its 21 buildings include Fordyce Chapel, a large fieldhouse and auditorium that accommodates many diocesan events, and 17 classroom buildings—including two designed and built by the American Schools and Hospitals Abroad program. The spacious campus includes two football fields and is adjacent to National Stadium, built in the 1960s, which hosts international events and has grown into the Marion Jones Sports Complex.

St. John's College pioneered adult evening education with the inauguration of its Extension School, in September 1947. The press release for its opening described its purpose: "One of the most valuable educational techniques of our day, co-operative search for truth, gives adult learners an opportunity to meet together, face a problem in common, think it through as a group, and solve it if possible." Initial courses were “The Art of Thinking”, “Effective Speaking and Parliamentary Practice”, “Capital and Labor”, and “Business Ethics”. The first class of 55 men and 27 women began a program aimed at providing leadership training for people who had finished high school and wanted post-secondary education that was unavailable in Belize at the time. The roster of students in those early days included the names of men who went on to lead Belize's independence movement.

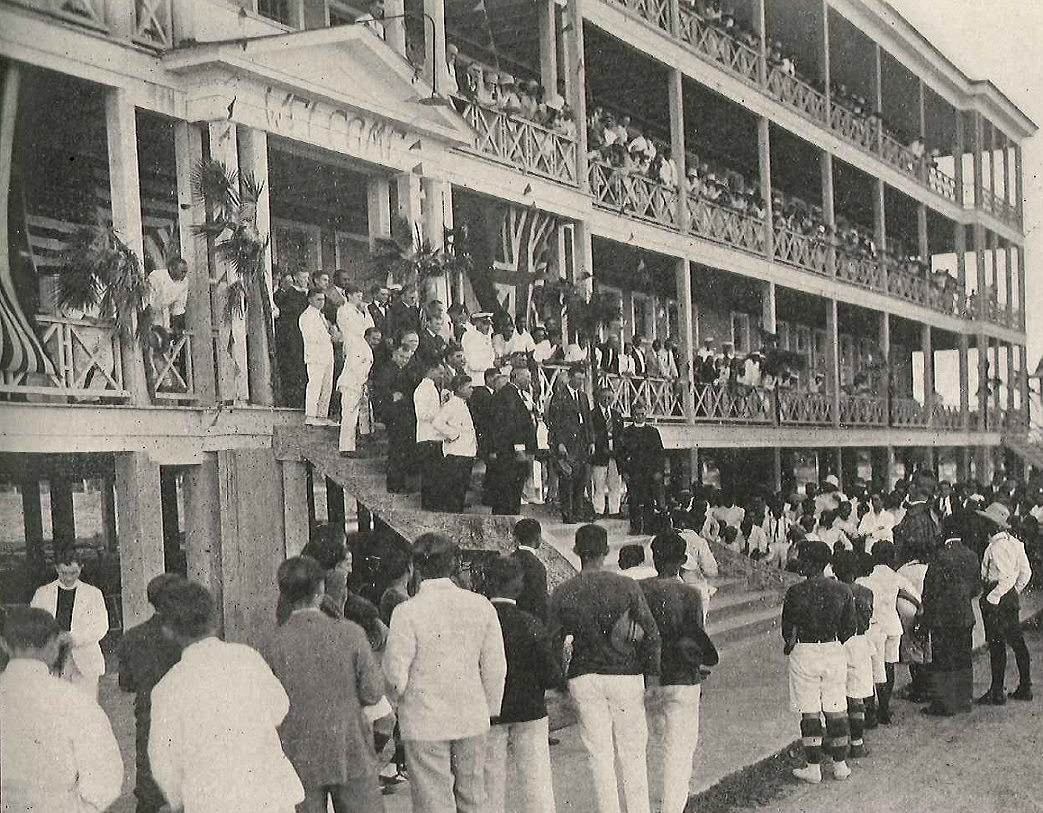
Pioneer aviator Charles Lindbergh at Loyola Park, 1928

In 1957 economics, bookkeeping, and arithmetic were part of the syllabus. In 1965 under Fr. Jack Stochl, S.J., it began offering high school equivalency courses for young men and women. The Extension Department is now in its fourth location, still in the center of the city, accessible to the students who work during the day and study at night. It features a computer lab to facilitate courses in business and accounting. Around 700 students, 70% women, take Extension courses, which requires only a grade school background of applicants. Classes are also provided for refugees from the neighbouring countries.

Early in 1952, in response to the growing need in Belize for higher levels of academic training, St. John's College expanded its traditional four-year high school program, offering a limited number of post-secondary school courses under the direction of Fr. Robert Raszkowski, S.J. This expanded into what in the British tradition is called Sixth Form, a two-year program leading to Advanced Level Examinations ("A-Levels") out of Cambridge University in England.

In the mid-1960s, in an effort to provide wider opportunities for further education to graduates of the Sixth Form, St. John's College broadened the program of studies so that it met the requirements of the associate degree awarded by junior and community colleges in the United States. It received membership in the American Association of Community and Junior Colleges. This afforded St. John's College Sixth Form graduates a choice of further studies. They could enter Commonwealth universities, which require Cambridge “A Level” certificates, or United States universities as transfer students into the third year of a Bachelor's degree program. Over 200 graduates of Sixth Form have received scholarships from the 28 Jesuit colleges and universities in the United States to finish their bachelor's degree tuition-free. Many accepted the offer to remain as teaching fellows and so finished their master's degree.

== St John's College High School ==
St. John's College High School

Location
- Landivar Campus, Princess Margaret Drive; Belize City; Belize

Information
- Type: Private secondary school
- Motto: Men and Woman for Others
- Religious affiliation: Catholicism
- Denomination: Jesuit
- Patron saint: John Berchmans
- Established: 1887; 139 years ago
- President: Jorge Espat
- Headmaster: Fidel Pol
- Faculty: 50
- Gender: Boys
- Enrollment: c. 600 (2010)
- Campus: Urban
- Colors: Navy and white
- Yearbook: The Mangrove
- Website: www.sjc.edu.bz/academics/high_school

St. John's College High School is a private Catholic selective secondary school for boys, located in Belize City, Belize. The school was founded in 1887 by the Society of Jesus as St. John Berchmans' College. The school exists to educate academically talented young men in a Jesuit environment of self-discipline, love of learning, and service to others. The school 's curriculum is complemented by sports and extracurricular activities. The third and fourth form classes follow the Caribbean Secondary Education Certificate (CSEC) curricula and sit the regionally administered examinations at the end of their fourth year.

=== Characteristics ===
The school is operated by the Jesuits as a preparatory high school for boys and is based on the British model of secondary education. The average class size is 32 boys and enrolment is 170 new boys per year. The school selects students for admission based on an 80 per cent school average of the last two years of primary school, and on a favourable recommendation from the Standard Six (8th Grade) teacher and principal.

There are approximately 50 teachers and two counsellors serving in the following departments:

- Language Arts
- Math / Vo-Tech
- Information Technology / Business
- Natural Science / Physical Education
- Humanities / Social Science Education

== Landivar campus ==
The main campus of St. John's College is named in honor of Fr. Rafael Landívar, S.J. (1731-1793) and features a bust of him in a very prominent area of the campus. Rafael Landívar was born in Guatemala October 27, 1731, entered the Jesuits in 1750, and taught philosophy and theology in Guatemala. Banished from the Spanish colonies, he retired to Italy and wrote a five-volume Latin poem, Rusticatio Mexicana, that has made him the national poet of Guatemala. He died and was buried in Bologna, but at the demand of students, his body was moved to Guatemala. Landivar made an etching of Bishop Payo Enriques de Rivera, the original of which is in the Jesuit residence in Madrid. It has appeared thirteen times on Guatemalan postage.

== Patron saint ==
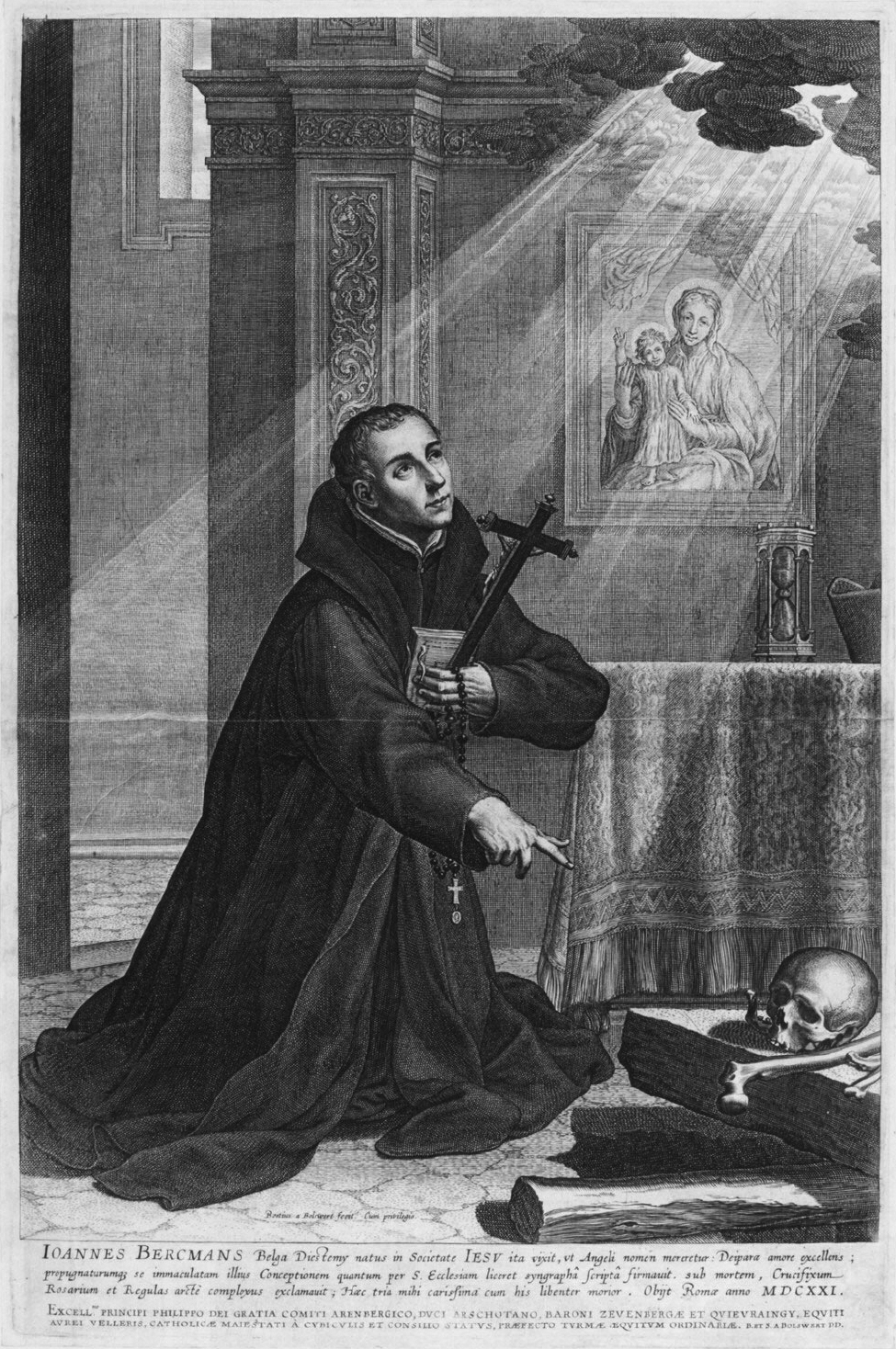

St. John Berchmans was born the eldest son of a shoemaker on 13 March 1599 in Diest at Brabant, which is located in Belgium. At a young age he wanted to be a priest, and at thirteen became a servant in the household of one of the cathedral canons at Malines. After his mother's death, his father and two brothers followed suit and entered religious life. In 1615, he entered the Jesuit college there, becoming a novice a year later. In 1618 he was sent to Rome for more studies, and was known for his cheerfulness and his effort to find perfection in all the little details of his life. His father was ordained that year, and died six months later. John was so poor and humble that he walked from Antwerp to Rome. He died at the age of 22 on August 13. Many miracles were attributed to him after his death. He was canonized in 1888, and is the patron saint of altar servers.

He longed to work in the mission fields of China, but did not live long enough to go there. After completing his course work, he was asked to defend the entire field of philosophy in a public disputation in July, just after his exit examinations. The following month he was asked to represent the Roman College in a debate with the Greek College. "John opened the discussion with great clarity and profoundness, but after returning to his own quarters, was seized with the Roman Fever," a particularly virulent form of malaria, that led to his death at the age of 22. The large numbers who came to view his remains testified to his sanctity. He was buried in the Church of the Gesù in Rome, the mother church of the Society of Jesus in which the Society's founder Saint Ignatius of Loyola is also buried.

== Notable alumni and staff ==
Prominent graduates who entered government service and had attended some division of St. John's College include Emil Arguelles, Johnny Briceño, Jorge Espat, Manuel Esquivel, Francis Fonseca, Ralph Fonseca, Caritas Lawrence, R.S.M., Zenaida Moya, Said Musa, George Cadle Price, and Bishop Dorick M. Wright.

Prominent personages who taught at SJC include Bishop David F. Hickey, S.J., Bishop Robert L. Hodapp, S.J., Edward J. O'Donnell. S.J., later president of Marquette University, William "Buck" Stanton, S.J., biology teacher and prominent naturalist, and Jack Stochl, S.J., who received Belize's Meritorious Service Award for 60 years of service to his adopted country.

Prominent graduates in other disciplines include, Professor Robert Kent Trench (see, Robert K. Trench) and Carolyn Gentle-Genitty.

== See also ==
- Catholic Church in Belize
- Education in Belize
- List of Jesuit schools
- List of Jesuit universities and colleges
