= Education in Belize =

Education in Belize is governed by the Education Act (Chapter 36 of the Laws of Belize).

The Human Rights Measurement Initiative (HRMI) finds that Belize is fulfilling only 84.4% of what it should be fulfilling for the right to education based on the country's level of income. HRMI breaks down the right to education by looking at the rights to both primary education and secondary education. While taking into consideration Belize's income level, the nation is achieving 92.5% of what should be possible based on its resources (income) for primary education but only 76.4% for secondary education.

== History ==
The growth and transformation of Belizean education took place in a number of phases, each related to important changes within the political and economic history of the country.

During the initial phase, between 1816 and 1892, the church-state partnership became institutionalized. Religious initiative and control, extremely limited state intervention, and vigorous competition of religious denominations for the allegiance of the inhabitants characterized this phase.

The intensification of denominational rivalry, the benign neglect of the colonial state, and the growing influence of United States Jesuit missionaries in education characterized the second phase which lasted from 1893 to 1934. In 1934 the director of education in Jamaica made a thorough investigation of British Honduras's education system. Reforms were proposed to increase spending on the school system and improve the standard of education. Implementation of many of these reforms began in the late 1930s.

During the next phase, from the late 1940s and early 1950s, the educational and social activities of the Jesuits influenced the rise of an anti-British, anticolonial nationalist movement. In the late 1950s and early 1960s, Jesuits led efforts to redress the elitist, urban-centered biases of postprimary education that perpetuated social inequality and the historical dominance of Belize City over its primarily rural hinterland. By the late 1950s, the Jesuits had emerged as the dominant influence at almost every level of formal education.

With the advent of a large degree of self-rule in 1964, the government began to assert its control over schooling. Formal control over education policy and planning passed from British-born clerics and colonial administrators to British-trained Belizeans. Actual education practice, however, changed very little; the religious denominations continued to determine the direction and pace of education expansion. United States influence in Belizean schools intensified, not only through the adoption of certain Jesuit practices for systemwide use, but also through the arrival of Peace Corps and other United States volunteer teachers and agencies such as CARE and the Michigan Partners.

As the demand for education outstripped the capacities of the churches—even the Jesuits—to provide it, interdenominational cooperation grew and the state assumed a more central role. By the 1970s, the Belizean government had assumed the leading role in establishing new schools, especially at the secondary and tertiary levels. The government conceived of education as an essential tool in the peaceful struggle for independence. But the expansion of educational opportunities outstripped the state's resources, leading to an intensified reliance on external aid. Since 1981, the United States has provided the bulk of this aid. This situation caused many Belizeans to fear the rise of a new form of imperialist control over the country.

Nowhere were fears of recolonization more realized than in higher education. In 1979 the ruling People's United Party (PUP) government established the Belize College of Arts, Science, and Technology (Belcast) with the intention of breaking Belize's dependence on the outside world for university education. The PUP envisioned Belcast as a government-run institution, with no participation from the church. Funding was secured from the European Economic Community for the construction of a campus in Belmopan.

The campus was never built because the PUP was swept out of office in a landslide victory by the rival United Democratic Party (UDP) in December 1984. The UDP revoked the Belcast ordinance and invited Ferris State College of Big Rapids, Michigan, to establish and manage a new institution, the University College of Belize (UCB). Control over the UCB program rested not with Belizeans, but with the administration of Ferris State College. The birth of UCB embodied Belizean nationalists' worst fears: The country lost sovereignty over an institution that symbolized Belize's first major effort to break from the country's colonial past in the education sector. The intense controversy arose again in 1991 when it was discovered that Ferris State College had failed to obtain proper accreditation for the UCB program, thus placing into question the value of the degrees UCB had granted since 1987. Following this controversy, the new PUP government revoked its agreement with Ferris State and assumed full control over the institution.

== Current status ==
=== School system ===
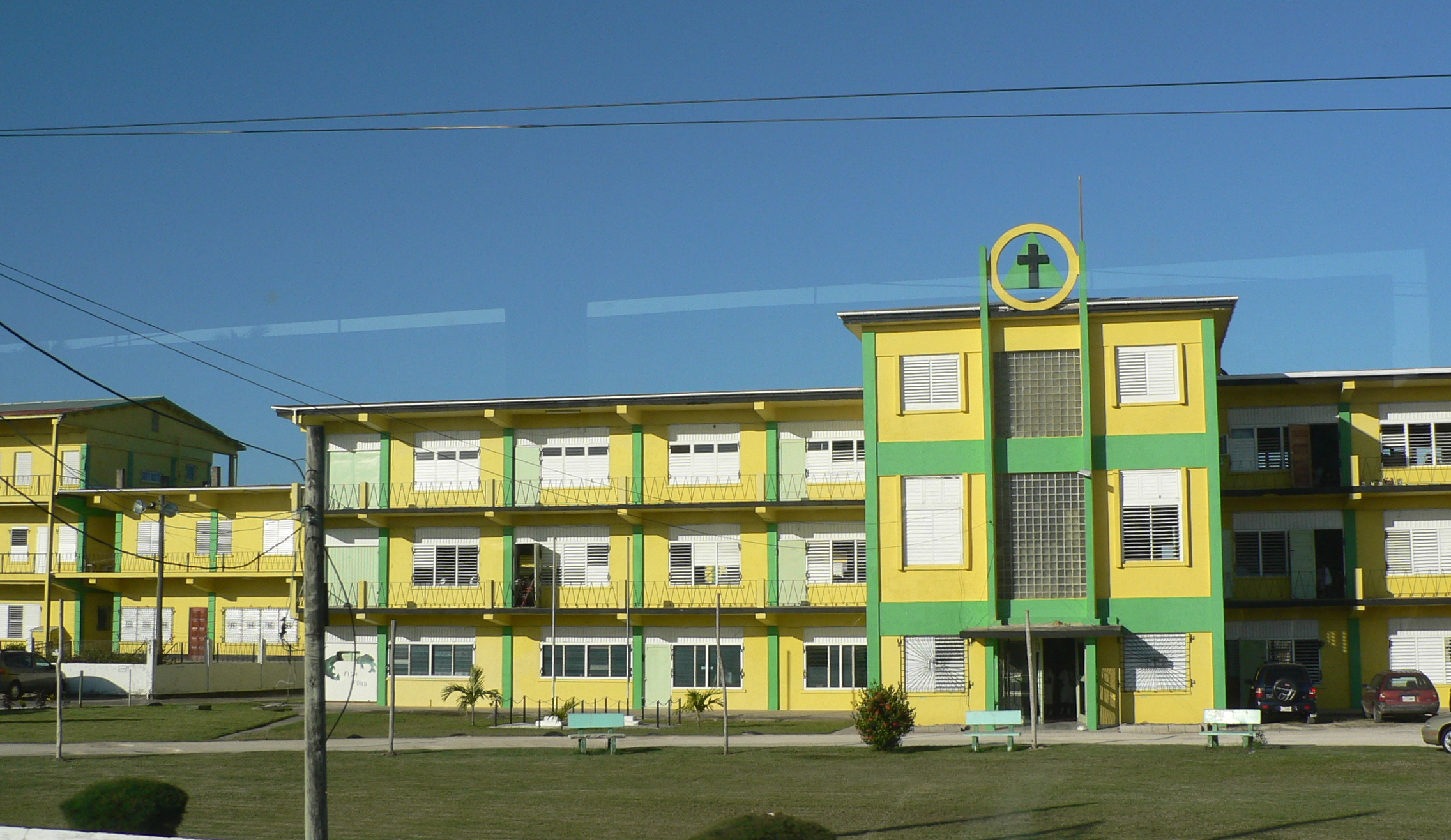
Pallotti High School in Belize City

The Belizean school system is a loose aggregate of education subsystems. The system is based on British education and is broken into three levels: Primary education, Secondary education and Tertiary education. Belizean children begin their eight years of primary education with two years of "infant" classes, followed by six "standards". Secondary education is divided into four "forms". Sixth form is a two-year post-secondary course, originally intended to prepare students for the Cambridge Advanced or "A-Level" examinations. Since the early 1970s, sixth-form institutions have also bestowed Associate of Arts degrees sanctioned by the United States Association of Junior Colleges.

Other post-secondary institutions include the University of Belize, Galen University, Wesley Junior College, in addition to UCB. Belize contributes to and participates in the multinational University of the West Indies. The University of the West Indies maintains an Open Campus site in Belize City.

Management of the system varies according to level. In the latter half of the 1980s, religious denominations controlled the majority of primary schools. The government or private, community-based boards of governors administered more than 50 percent of the secondary institutions. The preponderance of government institutions at the secondary level is a relatively new development; as recently as 1980, the majority of secondary schools were under religious management. Still, denominational representatives retain considerable influence on the managing boards of private, ostensibly nondenominational, institutions.

Secondary schools differ according to curriculum and cultural orientation. Most private and denominational schools emphasize academic and commercial studies, although some also offer technical-vocational programs. In contrast, the government directly manages nine schools, all of which offer a curriculum oriented to technical-vocational subjects.

In cultural orientation, education practices, rituals, and valuative criteria spread to Belize's schools from Jesuit institutions in the United States. Jesuit influence even affects such traditional bastions of British pedagogy as the Anglican and Methodist secondary schools and the government-run Belize Technical College. Nearly 30 years of Peace Corps and other United States volunteer teachers have also influenced Belizean education culture. Technical-vocational education programs by the United States Agency for International Development promise to erode further British pedagogical legacies.

=== Access to education ===
Education in Belize is compulsory between the ages of 5 and 16 years for primary education. In 2001, 93.2 percent of children ages 5 to 14 years were attending school. The Education Act subjects parents to a fine of up to US$100 if their children of compulsory school age fail to attend school regularly. Even so, there is large number of school dropouts and children who are not receiving any education due to financial constraints.

Primary education is free in some schools (mostly in the Orange Walk district and Cayo district), but related expenses, such as uniforms, books and annual school fees are a financial strain on poor families. Secondary schools and apprenticeship and vocational programs can only accommodate half of the children who complete primary school. In 2002 the gross primary enrollment rate was 122 percent and the net primary enrollment rate was 99 percent. (Gross and net enrollment ratios are based on the number of students formally registered in primary school and therefore do not necessarily reflect school attendance.) As of 1999, 81 percent of children enrolled in primary school were likely to reach grade 5. Results from the Child Activity Survey indicate that 12 percent of working children ages 5 to 14 years do not attend school.

=== Technology in the classroom ===
While most tertiary and secondary schools in Belize have access to Internet and computer labs, much of the primary school system does without. Some prominent high schools and primary schools in more urban areas have access to computers and the Internet but have failed to integrate technology to deliver curricula.

There have been positive moves to change the present status. One is the Free Internet for Schools program by Belize Telemedia Limited which promises to offer free Internet connections to schools at speeds up to 256 kbit/s.

The Ministry of Education has embarked on a project to digitize course materials so technology mediums may be used to deliver the content. A pilot program has been implemented for six schools and is underway with grants from Rotary International and the IDB. Status of the project remains unclear given that more than a year has passed since the inception of the project.

Sacred Heart Junior College (SHJC) in San Ignacio, Cayo district of Belize started a project that attempts to get the basic requirement of having an Internet connection in every primary school and by having the schools establish a web presence via the free Google Sites for education. The project, Primary Wireless Web Labs, wishes to get schools to use more technology in the classroom for non-IT classes.

The head of the computer science program and the departments students volunteer their time to coordinate with agencies/organizations to get the free Internet connections, domain names, hosting, etc. setup. The students gain valuable experience in the setup of everything required and the schools get valuable Internet access and web presence. The team at SHJC further encourages the schools to access resources like the Khan Academy, educational YouTube videos, online teaching materials, etc. to get schools to use technology to make learning more fun and interactive. More information about this initiative is at www.primary.edu.bz.

== Grade and form/standard equivalents ==
Grade and form/standard equivalents
Age as of Dec 2022	The U.S. and Canada (except Quebec)	Belize
4	Elementary: Kindergarten	Primary: Preschool
5	Elementary: Grade 1	Primary: Infant I
6	Elementary: Grade 2	Primary: Infant II
7	Elementary: Grade 3	Primary: Standard I
8	Elementary: Grade 4	Primary: Standard II
9	Elementary: Grade 5	Primary: Standard III
10	Elementary or Middle: Grade 6	Primary: Standard IV
11	Elementary, Middle or Jr High: Grade 7	Primary: Standard V
12	Elementary, Middle or Jr High: Grade 8	Primary: Standard VI/Primary School Examination (PSE)
13	Junior High or Secondary: Grade 9	Lower Secondary: 1st Form
14	Secondary: Grade 10	Lower Secondary: 2nd Form
15	Secondary: Grade 11	Upper Secondary: 3rd Form
16	Secondary: Grade 12	Upper Secondary: 4th Form. CXC Caribbean Secondary Education Certificate Examinations (CSEC)

== See also ==
- List of universities in Belize
