= 1906 in association football =

The following are the football (soccer) events of the year 1906 throughout the world.

== Events ==
- 2 March : Deportivo de La Coruña is founded.
- 1 July : Portuguese Club, Sporting CP is founded.
- 10 October : Spezia Calcio is founded.
- 3 December : Torino is founded.

== Winners club national championship ==
- Italy: A.C. Milan
- Greece: Ethnikos G.S. Athens (First Greek Champion
- Paraguay: Club Guaraní
- England: Liverpool F.C.
- Scotland: For fuller coverage, see 1905-06 in Scottish football.
  - Scottish Division One – Celtic
  - Scottish Division Two – Leith Athletic
  - Scottish Cup – Hearts

== International tournaments ==
- 1906 British Home Championship (27 February – 7 April 1906)

Shared by England & Scotland

== Births ==
- 5 January– Fonseca e Castro, Portuguese footballer
- 22 January– Harry Swaby, English professional footballer (died 1982)
- 7 March – Len Hargreaves, English professional footballer (died 1980)
- 1 May – Fernando Giudicelli, Brazilian international footballer (died 1968)
- 30 July – Alexis Thépot, French international footballer (died 1989)
- 4 September – Alwyne Wilks, English professional footballer
- 8 October – Hans Stubb, German international footballer (died 1973)
- 14 December – Clifford Heap, English professional footballer (died 1984)

== Clubs founded ==
- Deportivo de La Coruña
- Maccabi Tel Aviv F.C.
- RC Lens
- Spezia Calcio
- Sporting CP
- Terrassa FC
- Torino FC
- Neftçi PFK
