= Second Disraeli ministry =

Members of the government of the United Kingdom from 1874–1880

Beaconsfield ministry
- 1874–1880
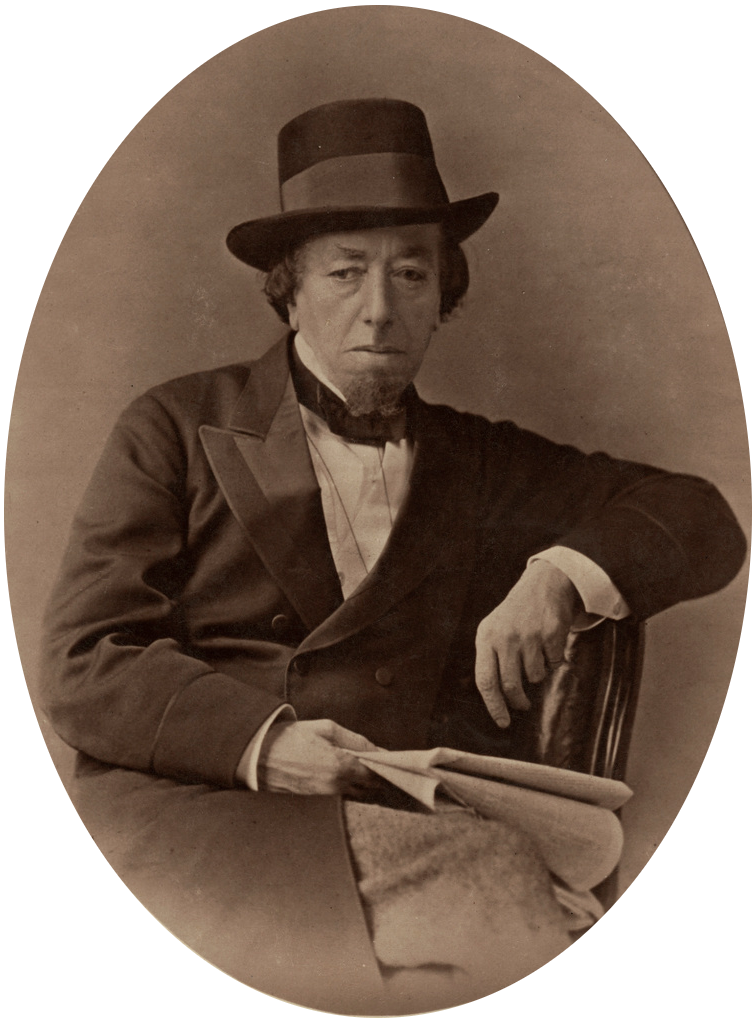
- Disraeli as Lord Beaconsfield (1878)
- Date formed: 20 February 1874
- Date dissolved: 21 April 1880

People and organisations
- Monarch: Victoria
- Prime Minister: Lord Beaconsfield
- Total no. of members: 108 appointments
- Member party: Conservative Party
- Status in legislature: Majority
- Opposition party: Liberal Party
- Opposition leaders: William Ewart Gladstone (1874–1875); Lord Hartington (1875–1880) in the House of Commons; Lord Granville in the House of Lords

History
- Election: 1874 general election
- Outgoing election: 1880 general election
- Legislature terms: 21st UK Parliament
- Predecessor: First Gladstone ministry
- Successor: Second Gladstone ministry

Benjamin Disraeli was appointed Prime Minister of the United Kingdom for a second time by Queen Victoria after William Ewart Gladstone's government was defeated in the 1874 general election. Disraeli's foreign policy was seen as immoral by Gladstone, and following the latter's Midlothian campaign, the government was heavily defeated in the 1880 general election, whereupon Gladstone formed his second government. The ailing Disraeli, by now created Earl of Beaconsfield, died in April 1881.

== Cabinet ==
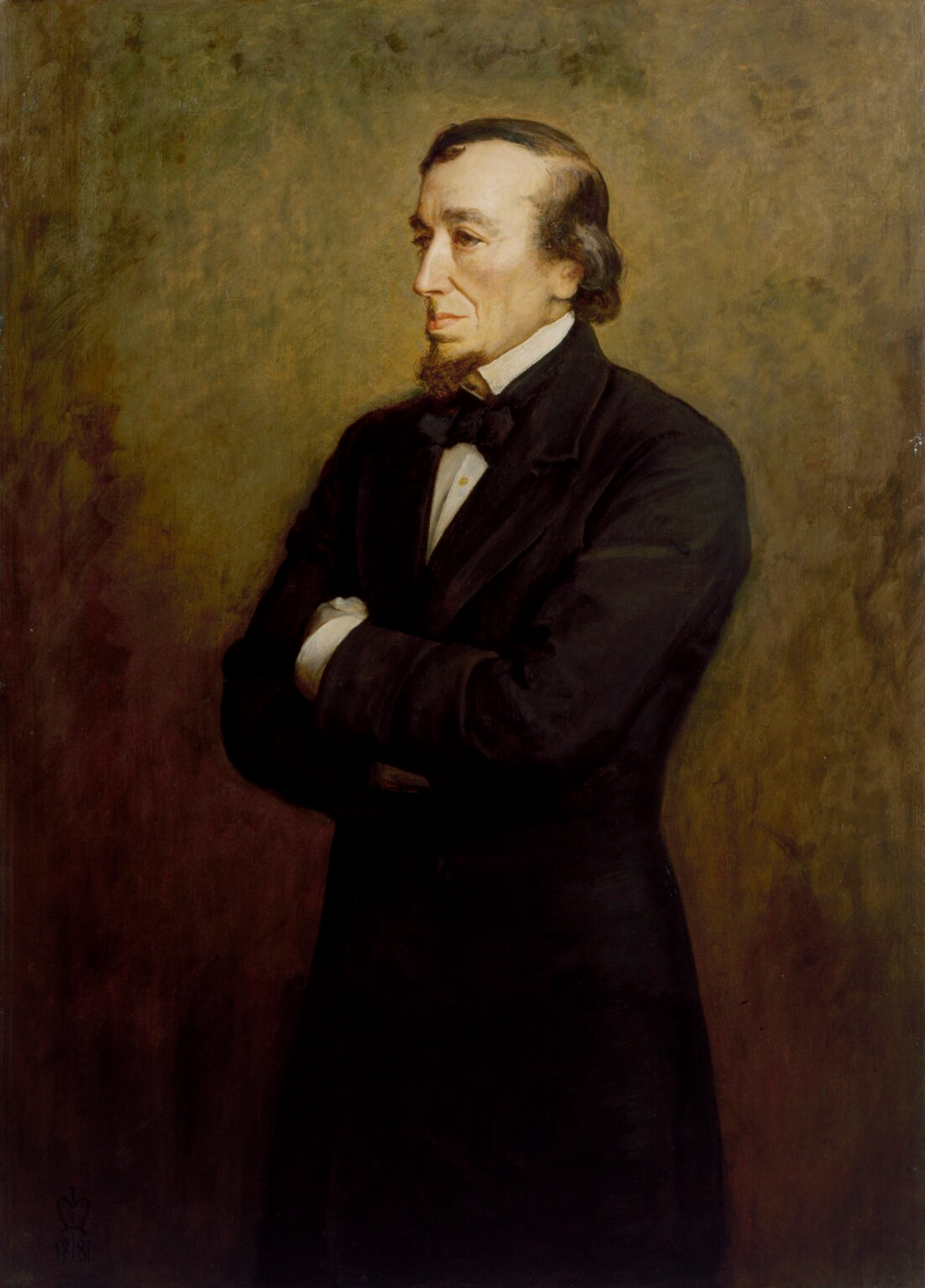
Portrait of Benjamin Disraeli by John Everett Millais, 1881

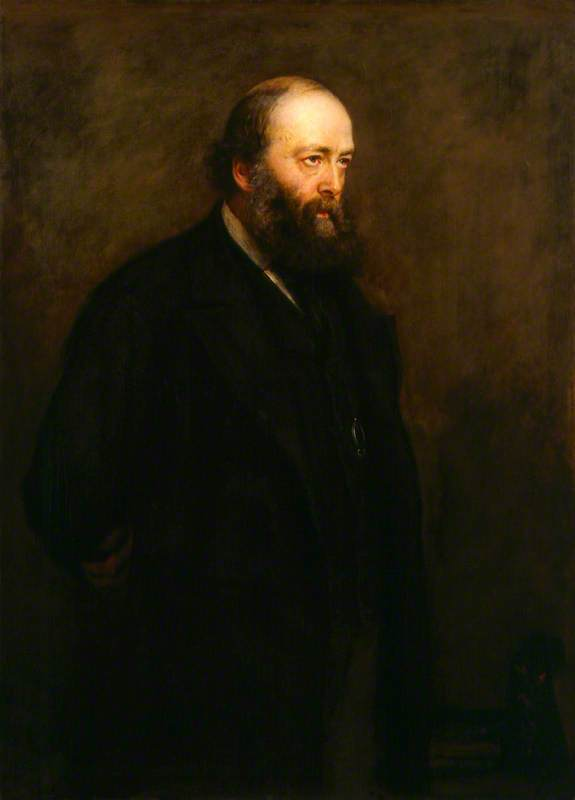
Portrait of the Marquess of Salisbury by John Everett Millais, 1883

=== February 1874 – April 1880 ===
Office	Name	Term
First Lord of the Treasury	Benjamin Disraeli†	February 1874 – April 1880
Lord Chancellor	Hugh Cairns, 1st Baron Cairns§	February 1874 – April 1880
Lord President of the Council	Charles Gordon-Lennox, 6th Duke of Richmond	February 1874 – April 1880
Lord Privy Seal	James Howard Harris, 3rd Earl of Malmesbury	February 1874 – August 1876
Lord Privy Seal	Benjamin Disraeli, 1st Earl of Beaconsfield	August 1876 – April 1878
Lord Privy Seal	Algernon Percy, 6th Duke of Northumberland	April 1878 – April 1880
Home Secretary	Richard A. Cross	February 1874 – April 1880
Foreign Secretary	Edward Stanley, 15th Earl of Derby	February 1874 – April 1878
Foreign Secretary	Robert Gascoyne-Cecil, 3rd Marquess of Salisbury	April 1878 – April 1880
Secretary of State for the Colonies	Henry Herbert, 4th Earl of Carnarvon	February 1874 – February 1878
Secretary of State for the Colonies	Sir Michael Hicks-Beach, 9th Baronet	February 1878 – April 1880
Secretary of State for War	Gathorne Hardy‡	February 1874 – April 1878
Secretary of State for War	Sir Frederick Stanley	April 1878 – April 1880
Secretary of State for India	Robert Gascoyne-Cecil, 3rd Marquess of Salisbury	February 1874 – April 1878
Secretary of State for India	Gathorne Gathorne Hardy, 1st Viscount Cranbrook	April 1878 – April 1880
Chancellor of the Exchequer	Sir Stafford Northcote, 8th Baronet	February 1874 – April 1880
First Lord of the Admiralty	George Ward Hunt	February 1874 – August 1877
First Lord of the Admiralty	William Henry Smith	August 1877 – April 1880
President of the Board of Trade	Dudley Ryder, Viscount Sandon	April 1878 – April 1880
Postmaster General	Lord John Manners	February 1874 – April 1880
Chief Secretary for Ireland	Sir Michael Hicks-Beach, 8th Baronet	August 1877 – February 1878
Chief Secretary for Ireland	incumbent not in the cabinet	
Leader of the House of Commons	Benjamin Disraeli	February 1874 – August 1876
Leader of the House of Commons	Sir Stafford Northcote, 8th Baronet	August 1876 – April 1880
Leader of the House of Lords	Charles Gordon-Lennox, 6th Duke of Richmond	February 1874 – August 1876
Leader of the House of Lords	Benjamin Disraeli, 1st Earl of Beaconsfield	August 1876 – April 1880

† The Earl of Beaconsfield from August 1876.
§ The Earl Cairns from September 1878.
‡ The Viscount Cranbrook from May 1878.

==== Notes ====
- The Earl of Beaconsfield served as both First Lord of the Treasury and Lord Privy Seal from August 1876 to April 1878.

==== Changes ====
- August 1876: Beaconsfield succeeds the Earl of Malmesbury as Lord Privy Seal while remaining First Lord of the Treasury.
- August 1877: George Ward Hunt dies and is succeeded as First Lord of the Admiralty by William Henry Smith. Sir Michael Hicks-Beach, the Chief Secretary for Ireland, enters the cabinet.
- February 1878: Sir Michael Hicks-Beach succeeds the Earl of Carnarvon as Colonial Secretary. Hicks-Beach's successor as Chief Secretary for Ireland is not in the cabinet.
- April 1878: The Duke of Northumberland succeeds Beaconsfield as Lord Privy Seal; the latter remains First Lord of the Treasury. The Marquess of Salisbury succeeds the Earl of Derby as Foreign Secretary. Viscount Cranbrook succeeds Salisbury at the India Office. Sir Frederick Stanley succeeds Cranbrook at the War Office.

== List of ministers ==
Cabinet members are listed in bold face.

Office	Name	Date
Prime Minister and First Lord of the Treasury	**Benjamin Disraeli** (Note: Created Earl of Beaconsfield 21 August 1876; also Leader of the House of Commons 1874–1876 and Leader of the House of Lords 21 August 1876 – 21 April 1880.)	20 February 1874 – 21 April 1880
Chancellor of the Exchequer	**Sir Stafford Northcote, 8th Baronet** (Note: Also Leader of the House of Commons 1876–1880.)	21 February 1874
Parliamentary Secretary to the Treasury	William Hart Dyke (Note: Inherited a baronetcy 1875.)	21 February 1874
Financial Secretary to the Treasury	W. H. Smith	21 February 1874
Financial Secretary to the Treasury	Frederick Stanley	14 August 1877
Financial Secretary to the Treasury	Sir Henry Selwin-Ibbetson, 7th Baronet	2 April 1878
Junior Lords of the Treasury	Arthur Stanhope, Viscount Mahon	4 March 1874 – 16 February 1876
Junior Lords of the Treasury	Rowland Winn	4 March 1874 – 21 April 1880
Junior Lords of the Treasury	Sir James Dalrymple-Horn-Elphinstone, 2nd Baronet	4 March 1874 – 21 April 1880
Junior Lords of the Treasury	John Crichton, Viscount Crichton	16 February 1876 – 21 April 1880
Lord Chancellor	**Hugh Cairns, 1st Baron Cairns** (Note: Created Earl Cairns on 27 September 1878.)	21 February 1874
Lord President of the Council	**Charles Gordon-Lennox, 6th Duke of Richmond** (Note: Also Leader of the House of Lords 21 February 1874 – 21 August 1876.)	21 February 1874
Lord Privy Seal	**James Harris, 3rd Earl of Malmesbury**	21 February 1874
Lord Privy Seal	**Benjamin Disraeli** (Note: Created Earl of Beaconsfield on 21 August 1876.)	12 August 1876
Lord Privy Seal	**Algernon Percy, 6th Duke of Northumberland**	4 February 1878
Secretary of State for the Home Department	**R. A. Cross**	21 February 1874
Under-Secretary of State for the Home Department	Sir Henry Selwin-Ibbetson, 7th Baronet	25 February 1874
Under-Secretary of State for the Home Department	Sir Matthew White Ridley, 5th Baronet	6 April 1878
Secretary of State for Foreign Affairs	**Edward Stanley, 15th Earl of Derby**	21 February 1874
Secretary of State for Foreign Affairs	**Robert Gascoyne-Cecil, 3rd Marquess of Salisbury**	2 April 1878
Under-Secretary of State for Foreign Affairs	Robert Bourke	23 February 1874
Secretary of State for War	**Gathorne Hardy**	21 February 1874
Secretary of State for War	**Frederick Stanley**	2 April 1878
Under-Secretary of State for War	George Herbert, 13th Earl of Pembroke	2 March 1874
Under-Secretary of State for War	George Cadogan, 5th Earl Cadogan	24 May 1875
Under-Secretary of State for War	William Keppel, Viscount Bury	4 March 1878
Financial Secretary to the War Office	Frederick Stanley	26 February 1874
Financial Secretary to the War Office	Robert Loyd-Lindsay	13 August 1877
Surveyor-General of the Ordnance	Lord Eustace Cecil	26 February 1874
Secretary of State for the Colonies	**Henry Herbert, 4th Earl of Carnarvon**	21 February 1874
Secretary of State for the Colonies	**Sir Michael Hicks-Beach, 8th Baronet**	4 February 1878
Under-Secretary of State for the Colonies	James Lowther	25 February 1874
Under-Secretary of State for the Colonies	George Cadogan, 5th Earl Cadogan	2 March 1878
Secretary of State for India	**Robert Gascoyne-Cecil, 3rd Marquess of Salisbury**	21 February 1874
Secretary of State for India	**Gathorne Gathorne-Hardy, 1st Viscount Cranbrook**	2 April 1878
Under-Secretary of State for India	Lord George Hamilton	22 February 1874
Under-Secretary of State for India	Edward Stanhope	6 April 1878
First Lord of the Admiralty	**George Ward Hunt**	21 February 1874
First Lord of the Admiralty	**W. H. Smith**	14 August 1877
Parliamentary Secretary to the Admiralty	Algernon Egerton	21 February 1874
Civil Lord of the Admiralty	Sir Massey Lopes, 3rd Baronet	4 March 1874
Chief Secretary for Ireland	**Sir Michael Hicks-Beach, 8th Baronet** (Note: Entered the Cabinet 12 August 1876.)	27 February 1874
Chief Secretary for Ireland	James Lowther	15 February 1878
Lord Lieutenant of Ireland	James Hamilton, 1st Duke of Abercorn	2 March 1874
Lord Lieutenant of Ireland	John Spencer-Churchill, 7th Duke of Marlborough	11 December 1876
Postmaster-General	**Lord John Manners**	21 February 1874
President of the Board of Trade	Sir Charles Adderley	21 February 1874
President of the Board of Trade	**Dudley Ryder, Viscount Sandon**	4 April 1878
Parliamentary Secretary to the Board of Trade	George Cavendish-Bentinck	2 March 1874
Parliamentary Secretary to the Board of Trade	Edward Stanhope	18 November 1875
Parliamentary Secretary to the Board of Trade	John Gilbert Talbot	4 April 1878
Vice-President of the Committee on Education	Dudley Ryder, Viscount Sandon	2 March 1874
Vice-President of the Committee on Education	Lord George Hamilton	4 April 1878
Chancellor of the Duchy of Lancaster	Thomas Edward Taylor	2 March 1874
President of the Local Government Board	George Sclater-Booth	21 February 1874
Parliamentary Secretary to the Local Government Board	Clare Sewell Read	21 February 1874
Parliamentary Secretary to the Local Government Board	Thomas Salt	January 1876
Paymaster General	Stephen Cave	20 April 1874
Paymaster General	David Plunket	24 March 1880
First Commissioner of Works	Lord Henry Lennox	21 March 1874
First Commissioner of Works	Gerard Noel	14 August 1876
Attorney General	Sir John Burgess Karslake	27 February 1874
Attorney General	Sir Richard Baggallay	20 April 1874
Attorney General	Sir John Holker	25 November 1875
Solicitor General	Sir Richard Baggallay	27 February 1874
Solicitor General	Sir John Holker	20 April 1874
Solicitor General	Sir Hardinge Giffard	25 November 1875
Judge Advocate General	Stephen Cave	7 March 1874
Judge Advocate General	George Cavendish-Bentinck	24 November 1875
Lord Advocate	Edward Gordon	26 February 1874
Lord Advocate	William Watson	21 July 1874
Solicitor General for Scotland	John Millar	4 March 1874
Solicitor General for Scotland	William Watson	21 July 1874
Solicitor General for Scotland	John Macdonald	5 December 1876
Attorney General for Ireland	John Thomas Ball	12 March 1874
Attorney General for Ireland	Henry Ormsby	21 January 1875
Attorney General for Ireland	George Augustus Chichester May	27 November 1875
Attorney General for Ireland	Edward Gibson	15 February 1877
Solicitor General for Ireland	Henry Ormsby	12 March 1874
Solicitor General for Ireland	David Plunkett	29 January 1875
Solicitor General for Ireland	Gerald Fitzgibbon	3 March 1877
Solicitor General for Ireland	Hugh Holmes	14 December 1878
Lord Steward of the Household	Frederick Lygon, 6th Earl Beauchamp	21 February 1874
Lord Chamberlain of the Household	Francis Seymour, 5th Marquess of Hertford	21 February 1874
Lord Chamberlain of the Household	William Edgcumbe, 4th Earl of Mount Edgcumbe	7 May 1879
Vice-Chamberlain of the Household	George Barrington, 7th Viscount Barrington	2 March 1874
Master of the Horse	Orlando Bridgeman, 3rd Earl of Bradford	7 March 1874
Treasurer of the Household	Henry Percy, Earl Percy	2 March 1874
Treasurer of the Household	Lord Henry Thynne	14 December 1875
Comptroller of the Household	Lord Henry Somerset	2 March 1874
Comptroller of the Household	Hugh Seymour, Earl of Yarmouth	4 February 1879
Captain of the Gentlemen-at-Arms	William Cecil, 3rd Marquess of Exeter	2 March 1874
Captain of the Gentlemen-at-Arms	Charles Chetwynd-Talbot, 19th Earl of Shrewsbury	4 February 1875
Captain of the Gentlemen-at-Arms	George Coventry, 9th Earl of Coventry	28 May 1877
Captain of the Yeomen of the Guard	Edward Bootle-Wilbraham, 2nd Baron Skelmersdale	2 March 1874
Master of the Buckhounds	Charles Yorke, 5th Earl of Hardwicke	2 March 1874
Mistress of the Robes	Elizabeth Wellesley, Duchess of Wellington	2 March 1874
Lords in Waiting	Charles Murray, 7th Earl of Dunmore	2 March 1874 – 21 April 1880
Lords in Waiting	Robert Jocelyn, 4th Earl of Roden	2 March 1874 – 6 January 1880
Lords in Waiting	Cornwallis Maude, 4th Viscount Hawarden	2 March 1874 – 21 April 1880
Lords in Waiting	William Bagot, 3rd Baron Bagot	2 March 1874 – 21 April 1880
Lords in Waiting	Dudley FitzGerald-de Ros, 24th Baron de Ros	2 March 1874 – 21 April 1880
Lords in Waiting	William Buller-Fullerton-Elphinstone, 15th Lord Elphinstone	2 March 1874 – 21 April 1880
Lords in Waiting	Thomas de Grey, 6th Baron Walsingham	2 March 1874 – 29 May 1875
Lords in Waiting	Victor Child-Villiers, 7th Earl of Jersey	29 May 1875 – 4 July 1877
Lords in Waiting	John Henniker-Major, 5th Baron Henniker	4 July 1877 – 21 April 1880
Lords in Waiting	William Onslow, 4th Earl of Onslow	17 February 1880 – 21 April 1880
Extra Lord in Waiting	Mortimer Sackville-West, 1st Baron Sackville	1 October 1876 – 1 October 1888

Notes

Preceded by First Gladstone ministry	Government of the United Kingdom; 1874–1880	Succeeded by Second Gladstone ministry
