= Chelsea F.C. league record by opponent =

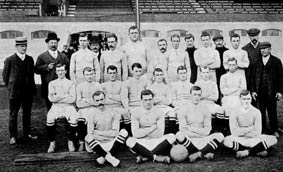
The Chelsea team in September 1905 before their inaugural season in the Football League Second Division.

Chelsea Football Club is a professional association football club based in Fulham, London. Founded in 1905, they were elected to play in The Football League as members of the Second Division. They were promoted into the First Division in the club's second season. Chelsea remained in the Football League, in the First or Second division, until 1992 when clubs in the First Division broke away from The Football League to form the Premier League. The club has remained in the top division of the English football league system since 1989. In their latest spell in the Second Division Chelsea achieved their highest points total achieving 99 in the 1988–89 season. As of the 2025–26 season, the club holds the records for the most clean sheets in a single Premier League season with 25 in 2004–05. Chelsea have been English football champions six times.

Chelsea played their inaugural league fixture as part of the Football League Second Division on 2 September 1905 against Stockport County. Since that game they have faced eighty different sides in league football with their most regular opponent having been Arsenal, whom they have played on 179 occasions. The club has won 70 of their league matches against Tottenham Hotspur which represents the most Chelsea have won against any club. Chelsea have drawn more matches with Manchester United than with any other club, with 54. The side has lost more league games to Liverpool than to any other club, having been defeated by them 72 times. They met their most recent different league opponent, Wigan Athletic, for the first time in the 2005–06 FA Premier League season.

== All-time league record ==
Statistics correct as of match played on 21 November 2026.

Colour key

Positive balance (more wins in total matches)
Neutral balance (equal W/L ratio in total matches)
Negative balance (more losses in total matches)

Key

- The table includes results of matches played by Chelsea in The Football League (First Division and Second Division) and the Premier League. League play-off matches are not included. Wartime matches are regarded as unofficial and are excluded.
- For the sake of simplicity, present-day names are used throughout: for example, results against Woolwich Arsenal, Small Heath, and The Wednesday are integrated into the records against Arsenal, Birmingham City, and Sheffield Wednesday, respectively.
- **Bolded** clubs competed in the 2026–27 Premier League alongside Chelsea.
- Italicised clubs are defunct.
- P = matches played; W = matches won; D = matches drawn; L = matches lost; GF = goals for; GA = goals against; GD = goal difference; Win% = percentage of matches won.

Chelsea F.C. league record by opponent
Club	Home								Away								Total								Notes	Ref.
Club	P	W	D	L	GF	GA	GD	Win%	P	W	D	L	GF	GA	GD	Win%	P	W	D	L	GF	GA	GD	Win%	Notes	Ref.
**Arsenal**	89	31	30	28	119	115	+4	34.83	90	23	23	44	109	144	−35	25.56	179	54	53	72	228	259	−31	30.17	(Note: Record against Woolwich Arsenal included.) (Note: The first match was played on 9 November 1907, and the last match was played on 6 September 2026.)	
**Aston Villa**	76	40	14	22	129	88	+41	52.63	76	22	20	34	110	130	−20	28.95	152	62	34	56	239	218	+21	40.79	(Note: The first match was played on 28 December 1907, and the last match was played on 4 March 2026.)	
Barnsley	15	11	0	4	35	19	+16	73.33	15	5	5	5	25	23	+2	33.33	30	16	5	9	60	42	+18	53.33	(Note: The first match was played on 4 November 1905, and the last match was played on 31 January 1998.)	
Birmingham City	41	23	12	6	78	43	+35	56.10	41	15	12	14	62	64	−2	36.59	82	38	24	20	140	107	+33	46.34	(Note: Record against Small Heath and Birmingham included.) (Note: The first match was played on 19 October 1907, and the last match was played on 20 April 2011.)	
Blackburn Rovers	51	27	12	12	94	56	+38	52.94	51	16	15	20	56	69	−13	31.37	102	43	27	32	150	125	+25	42.16	(Note: The first match was played on 5 October 1907, and the last match was played on 13 May 2012.)	
Blackpool	39	20	10	9	82	45	+37	51.28	39	16	4	19	55	64	−9	41.03	78	36	14	28	137	109	+28	46.15	(Note: The first match was played on 9 September 1905, and the last match was played on 7 March 2011.)	
Bolton Wanderers	54	29	13	12	98	63	+35	53.70	54	18	14	22	83	92	−9	33.33	108	47	27	34	181	155	+26	43.52	(Note: The first match was played on 12 October 1907, and the last match was played on 25 February 2012.)	
**Bournemouth**	11	6	2	3	20	11	+9	54.55	10	5	3	2	14	10	+4	50.00	21	11	5	5	34	21	+13	52.38	(Note: The first match was played on 3 September 1988, and the last match was played on 10 October 2026.)	
Bradford City	17	14	1	2	39	17	+22	82.35	17	3	7	7	19	33	−14	17.65	34	17	8	9	58	50	+8	50.00	(Note: The first match was played on 16 September 1905, and the last match was played on 23 December 2000.)	
Bradford Park Avenue	7	5	0	2	16	5	+11	71.43	7	3	1	3	9	9	+0	42.86	14	8	1	5	25	14	+11	57.14	(Note: The first match was played on 10 December 1910, and the last match was played on 12 March 1930.)	
**Brentford**	10	6	0	4	15	17	−2	60.00	11	2	5	4	9	12	−3	18.18	21	8	5	8	24	29	−5	38.10	(Note: The first match was played on 23 November 1935, and the last match was played on 18 September 2026.)	
**Brighton & Hove Albion**	12	8	2	2	24	13	+11	66.67	11	6	2	3	17	16	+1	54.55	23	14	4	5	41	29	+12	60.87	(Note: The first match was played on 3 September 1983, and the last match was played on 30 August 2026.)	
Bristol City	12	7	5	0	25	9	+16	58.33	12	0	6	6	7	16	−9	0.00	24	7	11	6	32	25	+7	29.17	(Note: The first match was played on 23 December 1905, and the last match was played on 18 April 1981.)	
Bristol Rovers	4	3	1	0	5	0	+5	75.00	4	1	0	3	3	7	−4	25.00	8	4	1	3	8	7	+1	50.00	(Note: The first match was played on 29 November 1975, and the last match was played on 14 March 1981.)	
Burnley	49	23	10	16	81	60	+21	46.94	49	16	12	21	64	86	−22	32.65	98	39	22	37	145	146	−1	39.80	(Note: The first match was played on 18 November 1905, and the last match was played on 21 February 2026.)	
Burton United	2	2	0	0	4	0	+4	100.00	2	1	0	1	5	4	+1	50.00	4	3	0	1	9	4	+5	75.00	(Note: The first match was played on 2 December 1905, and the last match was played on 23 February 1907.)	
Bury	5	4	0	1	16	8	+8	80.00	5	0	1	4	4	10	−6	0.00	10	4	1	5	20	18	+2	40.00	(Note: The first match was played on 21 December 1907, and the last match was played on 16 April 1963.)	
Cambridge United	5	4	1	0	16	3	+13	80.00	5	4	0	1	4	1	+3	80.00	10	8	1	1	20	4	+16	80.00	(Note: The first match was played on 29 September 1979, and the last match was played on 11 February 1984.)	
Cardiff City	19	12	2	5	38	17	+21	63.16	19	7	6	6	26	31	−5	36.84	38	19	8	11	64	48	+16	50.00	(Note: The first match was played on 8 February 1922, and the last match was played on 31 March 2019.)	
Carlisle United	5	3	1	1	9	6	+3	60.00	5	2	1	2	5	5	+0	40.00	10	5	2	3	14	11	+3	50.00	(Note: The first match was played on 17 August 1974, and the last match was played on 25 February 1984.)	
Charlton Athletic	33	16	7	10	60	42	+18	48.48	33	12	9	12	48	54	−6	36.36	66	28	16	22	108	96	+12	42.42	(Note: The first match was played on 2 November 1929, and the last match was played on 3 February 2007.)	
Chesterfield	2	1	0	1	7	2	+5	50.00	2	1	1	0	2	0	+2	50.00	4	2	1	1	9	2	+7	50.00	(Note: Record against Chesterfield Town included.) (Note: The first match was played on 21 October 1905, and the last match was played on 6 April 1907.)	
**Coventry City**	27	17	6	4	51	29	+22	62.96	27	8	8	11	39	42	−3	29.63	54	25	14	15	90	71	+19	46.30	(Note: The first match was played on 30 August 1924, and the last match was played on 3 March 2001.)	
**Crystal Palace**	29	16	10	3	52	24	+28	55.17	29	17	7	5	46	23	+23	58.62	58	33	17	8	98	47	+51	56.90	(Note: The first match was played on 27 September 1924, and the last match was played on 25 January 2026.)	
Darlington	2	1	1	0	7	4	+3	50.00	2	0	2	0	3	3	+0	0.00	4	1	3	0	10	7	+3	25.00	(Note: The first match was played on 10 October 1925, and the last match was played on 7 May 1927.)	
Derby County	47	21	15	11	79	54	+25	44.68	47	13	10	24	58	84	−26	27.66	94	34	25	35	137	138	−1	36.17	(Note: The first match was played on 3 September 1910, and the last match was played on 12 March 2008.)	
**Everton**	87	46	29	12	166	77	+89	52.87	88	20	24	44	106	171	−65	22.73	175	66	53	56	272	248	+24	37.71	(Note: The first match was played on 26 October 1907, and the last match was played on 17 October 2026.)	
**Fulham**	41	24	14	3	63	27	+36	58.54	42	26	9	7	76	44	+32	61.90	83	50	23	10	139	71	+68	60.24	(Note: The first match was played on 3 December 1910, and the last match was played on 24 August 2026.)	
Gainsborough Trinity	4	3	0	1	9	4	+5	75.00	4	2	1	1	6	4	+2	50.00	8	5	1	2	15	8	+7	62.50	(Note: The first match was played on 16 December 1905, and the last match was played on 20 March 1912.)	
Glossop North End (Note: Record against Glossop included.)	4	3	1	0	12	2	+10	75.00	4	3	0	1	8	5	+3	75.00	8	6	1	1	20	7	+13	75.00	(Note: The first match was played on 26 December 1905, and the last match was played on 6 April 1912.)	
Grimsby Town	20	15	2	3	52	19	+33	75.00	20	5	5	10	21	28	−7	25.00	40	20	7	13	73	47	+26	50.00	(Note: The first match was played on 9 December 1905, and the last match was played on 12 May 1984.)	
Hereford United	1	1	0	0	5	1	+4	100.00	1	0	1	0	2	2	+0	0.00	2	1	1	0	7	3	+4	50.00	(Note: The first match was played on 6 November 1976, and the last match was played on 1 January 1977.)	
Huddersfield Town	30	14	8	8	53	31	+22	46.67	30	12	1	17	41	56	−15	40.00	60	26	9	25	94	87	+7	43.33	(Note: The first match was played on 20 March 1911, and the last match was played on 2 February 2019.)	
**Hull City**	19	15	4	0	38	5	+33	78.95	18	10	4	4	28	18	+10	55.56	37	25	8	4	66	23	+43	67.57	(Note: The first match was played on 11 September 1905, and the last match was played on 12 September 2026.)	
**Ipswich Town**	20	13	5	2	44	20	+24	65.00	20	6	6	8	24	31	−7	30.00	40	19	11	10	68	51	+17	47.50	(Note: The first match was played on 2 December 1961, and the last match was played on 13 April 2025.)	
Leeds City	4	4	0	0	14	3	+11	100.00	4	1	3	0	4	3	+1	25.00	8	5	3	0	18	6	+12	62.50	(Note: The first match was played on 25 November 1905, and the last match was played on 6 January 1912.)	
**Leeds United**	50	24	14	12	85	56	+29	48.00	49	6	13	30	36	95	−59	12.24	99	30	27	42	121	151	−30	30.30	(Note: The first match was played on 10 December 1927, and the last match was played on 21 November 2026.)	
Leicester City	55	36	14	5	110	47	+63	65.45	55	16	18	21	79	81	−2	29.09	110	52	32	26	189	128	+61	47.27	(Note: Record against Leicester Fosse included.) (Note: The first match was played on 30 September 1905, and the last match was played on 9 March 2025.)	
Leyton Orient	14	7	4	3	23	15	+8	50.00	14	8	2	4	23	14	+9	57.14	28	15	6	7	46	29	+17	53.57	(Note: Record against Clapton Orient included, and record against Orient included.) (Note: The first match was played on 11 November 1905, and the last match was played on 5 May 1982.)	
Lincoln City	3	3	0	0	13	2	+11	100.00	3	2	1	0	9	1	+8	66.67	6	5	1	0	22	3	+19	83.33	(Note: The first match was played on 14 October 1905, and the last match was played on 4 March 1911.)	
**Liverpool**	83	41	20	22	136	87	+49	49.40	83	12	21	50	87	167	−80	14.46	166	53	41	72	223	254	−31	31.93	(Note: The first match was played on 25 December 1907, and the last match was played on 9 May 2026.)	
Luton Town	20	11	5	4	40	22	+18	55.00	20	6	6	8	26	31	−5	30.00	40	17	11	12	66	53	+13	42.50	(Note: The first match was played on 30 March 1956, and the last match was played on 30 December 2023.)	
**Manchester City**	81	38	23	20	129	94	+35	46.91	81	24	19	38	89	120	−31	29.63	162	62	42	58	218	214	+4	38.27	(Note: The first match was played on 7 December 1907, and the last match was played on 12 April 2026.)	
**Manchester United**	85	29	24	32	125	133	−8	34.12	84	19	30	35	81	132	−51	22.62	169	48	54	67	206	265	−59	28.40	(Note: The first match was played on 25 December 1905, and the last match was played on 31 October 2026.)	
Middlesbrough	53	35	13	5	102	37	+65	66.04	53	14	16	23	61	81	−20	26.42	106	49	29	28	163	118	+45	46.23	(Note: The first match was played on 26 December 1907, and the last match was played on 8 May 2017.)	
Millwall	4	2	1	1	8	4	+4	50.00	4	1	1	2	4	6	−2	25.00	8	3	2	3	12	10	+2	37.50	(Note: The first match was played on 17 November 1928, and the last match was played on 5 May 1990.)	
**Newcastle United**	80	48	20	12	154	80	+74	60.00	80	19	19	42	86	122	−36	23.75	160	67	39	54	240	202	+38	41.88	(Note: The first match was played on 14 September 1907, and the last match was played on 14 March 2026.)	
Northampton Town	1	1	0	0	1	0	+1	100.00	1	1	0	0	3	2	+1	100.00	2	2	0	0	4	2	+2	100.00	(Note: The first match was played on 27 December 1965, and the last match was played on 28 December 1965.)	
Norwich City	22	12	6	4	42	19	+23	54.55	22	8	6	8	27	31	−4	36.36	44	20	12	12	69	50	+19	45.45	(Note: The first match was played on 17 November 1962, and the last match was played on 10 March 2022.)	
**Nottingham Forest**	46	22	15	9	64	51	+13	47.83	46	14	14	18	55	80	−25	30.43	92	36	29	27	119	131	−12	39.13	(Note: The first match was played on 6 October 1906, and the last match was played on 4 May 2026.)	
Notts County	16	9	4	3	34	22	+12	56.25	16	3	4	9	15	30	−15	18.75	32	12	8	12	49	52	−3	37.50	(Note: The first match was played on 30 November 1907, and the last match was played on 26 December 1991.)	
Oldham Athletic	24	14	7	3	47	25	+22	58.33	24	5	6	13	30	35	−5	20.83	48	19	13	16	77	60	+17	39.58	(Note: The first match was played on 28 September 1912, and the last match was played on 12 February 1994.)	
Oxford United	5	3	1	1	11	7	+4	60.00	5	1	3	1	10	10	+0	20.00	10	4	4	2	21	17	+4	40.00	(Note: The first match was played on 27 August 1975, and the last match was played on 2 January 1989.)	
Plymouth Argyle	4	1	3	0	10	5	+5	25.00	4	3	0	1	8	4	+4	75.00	8	4	3	1	18	9	+9	50.00	(Note: The first match was played on 1 December 1962, and the last match was played on 18 February 1989.)	
Port Vale	7	6	1	0	19	5	+14	85.71	7	1	3	3	10	8	+2	14.29	14	7	4	3	29	13	+16	50.00	(Note: Record against Burslem Port Vale included.) (Note: The first match was played on 30 October 1905, and the last match was played on 6 April 1929.)	
Portsmouth	37	19	12	6	78	49	+29	51.35	37	14	10	13	57	56	+1	37.84	74	33	22	19	135	105	+30	44.59	(Note: The first match was played on 25 October 1924, and the last match was played on 24 March 2010.)	
Preston North End	35	18	10	7	62	31	+31	51.43	35	10	6	19	41	62	−21	28.57	70	28	16	26	103	93	+10	40.00	(Note: The first match was played on 14 December 1907, and the last match was played on 28 February 1981.)	
Queens Park Rangers	23	12	6	5	36	26	+10	52.17	23	5	10	8	25	31	−6	21.74	46	17	16	13	61	57	+4	36.96	(Note: The first match was played on 14 September 1968, and the last match was played on 12 April 2015.)	
Reading	7	4	3	0	10	5	+5	57.14	7	3	2	2	12	12	+0	42.86	14	7	5	2	22	17	+5	50.00	(Note: The first match was played on 13 November 1926, and the last match was played on 30 January 2013.)	
Rotherham United	3	1	1	1	5	5	+0	33.33	3	1	0	2	1	7	−6	33.33	6	2	1	3	6	12	−6	33.33	(Note: The first match was played on 18 August 1962, and the last match was played on 30 April 1983.)	
Scunthorpe United	1	1	0	0	3	0	+3	100.00	1	0	0	1	0	3	−3	0.00	2	1	0	1	3	3	+0	50.00	(Note: The first match was played on 22 August 1962, and the last match was played on 28 August 1962.)	
Sheffield United	40	22	11	7	81	44	+37	55.00	40	14	6	20	53	68	−15	35.00	80	36	17	27	134	112	+22	45.00	(Note: The first match was played on 7 September 1907, and the last match was played on 7 April 2024.)	
Sheffield Wednesday	50	21	17	12	66	50	+16	42.00	50	6	19	25	60	102	−42	12.00	100	27	36	37	126	152	−26	27.00	(Note: Record against The Wednesday included.) (Note: The first match was played on 16 November 1907, and the last match was played on 15 April 2000.)	
Shrewsbury Town	6	4	0	2	14	7	+7	66.67	6	1	2	3	7	11	−4	16.67	12	5	2	5	21	18	+3	41.67	(Note: The first match was played on 15 September 1979, and the last match was played on 29 April 1989.)	
South Shields	4	2	2	0	11	2	+9	50.00	4	0	2	2	3	8	−5	0.00	8	2	4	2	14	10	+4	25.00	(Note: The first match was played on 22 November 1924, and the last match was played on 14 April 1928.)	
Southampton	50	23	14	13	85	60	+25	46.00	50	23	13	14	85	65	+20	46.00	100	46	27	27	170	125	+45	46.00	(Note: The first match was played on 4 October 1924, and the last match was played on 25 February 2025.)	
Stockport County	6	4	2	0	12	5	+7	66.67	6	2	2	2	5	8	−3	33.33	12	6	4	2	17	13	+4	50.00	(Note: The first match was played on 2 September 1905, and the last match was played on 20 March 1926.)	
Stoke City	44	26	11	7	86	50	+36	59.09	44	19	8	17	56	58	−2	43.18	88	45	19	24	142	108	+34	51.14	(Note: Record against Stoke included.) (Note: The first match was played on 28 August 1922, and the last match was played on 30 December 2017.)	
**Sunderland**	61	40	11	10	138	63	+75	65.57	62	21	10	31	82	115	−33	33.87	123	61	21	41	220	178	+42	49.59	(Note: The first match was played on 2 November 1907, and the last match was played on 8 November 2026.)	
Swansea City	16	11	4	1	40	14	+26	68.75	16	5	6	5	17	17	+0	31.25	32	16	10	6	57	31	+26	50.00	(Note: Record against Swansea Town included.) (Note: The first match was played on 21 November 1925, and the last match was played on 28 April 2018.)	
Swindon Town	2	2	0	0	5	2	+3	100.00	2	1	1	0	4	2	+2	50.00	4	3	1	0	9	4	+5	75.00	(Note: The first match was played on 9 October 1988, and the last match was played on 27 April 1994.)	
**Tottenham Hotspur**	79	40	18	21	118	90	+28	50.63	78	30	20	28	121	126	−5	38.46	157	70	38	49	239	216	+23	44.59	(Note: The first match was played on 18 December 1909, and the last match was played on 24 October 2026.)	
Walsall	2	1	0	1	2	1	+1	50.00	2	2	0	0	12	1	+11	100.00	4	3	0	1	14	2	+12	75.00	(Note: The first match was played on 10 November 1962, and the last match was played on 4 February 1989.)	
Watford	16	8	4	4	33	24	+9	50.00	16	10	1	5	26	22	+4	62.50	32	18	5	9	59	46	+13	56.25	(Note: The first match was played on 22 September 1979, and the last match was played on 22 May 2022.)	
West Bromwich Albion	63	32	16	15	128	82	+46	50.79	63	24	15	24	83	104	−21	38.10	126	56	31	39	211	186	+25	44.44	(Note: The first match was played on 23 September 1905, and the last match was played on 3 April 2021.)	
West Ham United	57	32	12	13	107	70	+37	56.14	57	19	10	28	82	95	−13	33.33	114	51	22	41	189	165	+24	44.74	(Note: The first match was played on 20 October 1923, and the last match was played on 31 January 2026.)	
Wigan Athletic	8	7	1	0	23	4	+19	87.50	8	6	1	1	17	6	+11	75.00	16	13	2	1	40	10	+30	81.25	(Note: The first match was played on 14 August 2005, and the last match was played on 9 February 2013.)	
Wimbledon	13	4	5	4	22	23	−1	30.77	13	6	5	2	16	11	+5	46.15	26	10	10	6	38	34	+4	38.46	(Note: The first match was played on 6 December 1986, and the last match was played on 12 February 2000.)	
Wolverhampton Wanderers	58	25	17	16	117	83	+34	43.10	58	19	13	26	87	109	−22	32.76	116	44	30	42	204	192	+12	37.93	(Note: The first match was played on 8 December 1906, and the last match was played on 7 February 2026.)	
Wrexham	3	2	1	0	7	3	+4	66.67	3	1	0	2	4	3	+1	33.33	6	3	1	2	11	6	+5	50.00	(Note: The first match was played on 25 August 1979, and the last match was played on 27 February 1982.)	
York City	1	0	1	0	0	0	+0	0.00	1	0	1	0	2	2	+0	0.00	2	0	2	0	2	2	+0	0.00	(Note: The first match was played on 4 October 1975, and the last match was played on 24 April 1976.)	
Total	**2,231**	**1,191**	**572**	**468**	**4,097**	**2,443**	**+1654**	**53.38**	**2,230**	**706**	**573**	**951**	**2,895**	**3,548**	**−653**	**31.66**	**4,461**	**1,897**	**1,145**	**1,419**	**6,992**	**5,991**	**+1001**	**42.52**	–	–
