= Swaby (surname) =

Swaby is a surname. Notable people with the surname include:

- Allyson Swaby (born 1996), American-born Jamaican footballer
- Chantelle Swaby (born 1998), American-born Jamaican footballer
- Cyril Swaby (1905–1974), Anglican Bishop of Jamaica
- Donn Swaby (born 1973), American actor
- Gordon Swaby (born 1990), Jamaican internet entrepreneur
- Harry Swaby (1906–1982), English footballer
- James Swaby (1798–1863), Jamaican officer in the British Army
- James Swaby (priest) (1862–1944), Archdeacon of Belize
- Javid Swaby-Neavin (born 2001), English footballer
- Lee Swaby (born 1976), British boxer
- Mario Swaby (born 1982), Jamaican footballer
- Proctor Swaby (1844–1916), British-born colonial bishop

== See also ==
- George Swabey (1881–1952), Royal Navy officer
