= Hogbin =

Hogbin is a surname. Notable people with the surname include:

- Emma Jane Hogbin (born 1977), Canadian technical writer, free software advocate and politician
- George Hogbin (died 1937), British priest
- Henry Hogbin (1880–1966), English businessman and politician
- Ian Hogbin (1904–1989), Australian anthropologist

== See also ==
- Hogben
