= List of churches in Belize =

This is a list of notable churches in Belize. Christianity is the dominant religion in Belize. The single largest denomination is the Roman Catholic Church with about 40.1% of the population (129,456 adherents), a reduction from 49.6% of the population in 2000, 57.7% in 1991 and 61.9% in 1980, although absolute numbers have still risen. Other major groups include Pentecostal with 8.4% of the population up from 7.4% in 2000 and 6.3% in 1991, Seventh-day Adventists with 5.4% of the population up from 5.2% in 2000 and 4.1% in 1991.

== By location ==
=== Belize City ===
- Port Loyola Calvary Chapel
- St. Andrew's Church (Belize City)
- Unity Presbyterian Church, Belize City

=== Belmopan ===
- Our Lady of Guadalupe Co-Cathedral
- St. Ann's Anglican Church

=== San Ignacio ===
- St. Andrew's Anglican Church (San Ignacio)

== By type ==
=== Roman Catholic churches in Belize ===
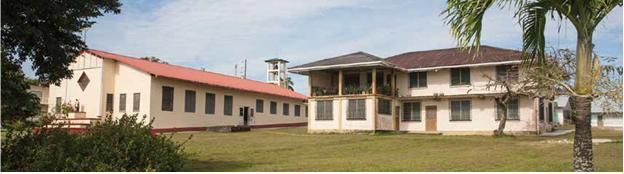
St. Peter Claver church and rectory in Punta Gorda, Belize

- Sacred Heart Church, Dangriga
- St. Peter Claver Catholic parish, Belize

==== Roman Catholic churches in Belize City ====
- Holy Redeemer Cathedral
- Holy Redeemer Catholic Parish, Belize City
- St. Martin de Porres Church, Belize City

== See also ==
- Religion in Belize
- Culture of Belize
