= James Swaby (priest) =

James Alexander Renton Swaby (1862–1944) was the Archdeacon of Belize from 1899 to 1907.

Swaby was ordained in 1891. He was Head Master of the Church School, Belize and Chaplain to the Bishop before his appointment as Archdeacon; and Curate at Tonbridge, then Rector of Lytchett Matravers afterwards.

He died on 3 August 1944; his widow Caroline on July 8, 1949.
