= 1905–06 Football League =

18th season of the Football League

The Football League
- Season: 1905–06
- Champions: Liverpool
- Relegated: none
- New Clubs in League: Chelsea, Hull City, Leeds City, Stockport County, Clapton Orient

The 1905–06 season was the 18th season of The Football League.

== Final league tables ==
Beginning in the 1894–95 season, clubs finishing level on points were separated according to goal average (goals scored divided by goals conceded). In case one or more teams had the same goal difference, this system favoured those teams who had scored fewer goals. The goal average system was eventually scrapped beginning with the 1976–77 season.

During the first six seasons of the league, (up to the 1893–94 season), re-election process concerned the clubs which finished in the bottom four of the league. From the 1894–95 season and until the 1920–21 season the re-election process was required of the clubs which finished in the bottom three of the league.

== First Division ==
First Division
- Season: 1905–06
- Champions: Liverpool; 2nd English title
- Relegated: Nottingham Forest; Wolverhampton Wanderers
- Matches: 380
- Goals: 1,242 (3.27 per match)
- Top goalscorer: Walter White (26 goals)
- Biggest home win: Newcastle United 8–0 Wolverhampton Wanderers (11 November 1905)
- Biggest away win: Middlesbrough 1–5 Liverpool (11 November 1905)
- Highest scoring: Sunderland 7–2 Wolverhampton Wanderers (10 March 1906)
- Longest winning run: 9 matches Bolton Wanderers
- Longest unbeaten run: 10 matches Blackburn Rovers; Liverpool
- Longest losing run: 5 matches Middlesbrough; Sunderland; Wolverhampton Wanderers; Woolwich Arsenal
- Highest attendance: 50,000; Newcastle United 1–1 Sunderland (30 December 1905)
- Lowest attendance: 1,500; Derby County 1–1 Middlesbrough (6 January 1906)
- Average attendance: 13,516

Pos	Team	Pld	W	D	L	GF	GA	GAv	Pts	Relegation
1	Liverpool (C)	38	23	5	10	79	46	1.717	51	
2	Preston North End	38	17	13	8	54	39	1.385	47	
3	The Wednesday	38	18	8	12	63	52	1.212	44	
4	Newcastle United	38	18	7	13	74	48	1.542	43	
5	Manchester City	38	19	5	14	73	54	1.352	43	
6	Bolton Wanderers	38	17	7	14	81	67	1.209	41	
7	Birmingham	38	17	7	14	65	59	1.102	41	
8	Aston Villa	38	17	6	15	72	56	1.286	40	
9	Blackburn Rovers	38	16	8	14	54	52	1.038	40	
10	Stoke	38	16	7	15	54	55	0.982	39	
11	Everton	38	15	7	16	70	66	1.061	37	
12	Woolwich Arsenal	38	15	7	16	62	64	0.969	37	
13	Sheffield United	38	15	6	17	57	62	0.919	36	
14	Sunderland	38	15	5	18	61	70	0.871	35	
15	Derby County	38	14	7	17	39	58	0.672	35	
16	Notts County	38	11	12	15	55	71	0.775	34	
17	Bury	38	11	10	17	57	74	0.770	32	
18	Middlesbrough	38	10	11	17	56	71	0.789	31	
19	Nottingham Forest (R)	38	13	5	20	58	79	0.734	31	Relegation to the Second Division
20	Wolverhampton Wanderers (R)	38	8	7	23	58	99	0.586	23	Relegation to the Second Division

Source: World Football
Rules for classification: 1) Points; 2) Goal average; 3) Goals scored
(C) Champions; (R) Relegated

=== Results ===
Home \ Away	AST	BIR	BLB	BOL	BRY	DER	EVE	LIV	MCI	MID	NEW	NOT	NTC	PNE	SHU	STK	SUN	WED	WOL	WOO
Aston Villa		1–3	0–1	1–1	3–3	6–0	4–0	5–0	2–1	4–1	0–3	3–1	2–1	0–1	4–1	3–0	2–1	3–0	6–0	2–1
Birmingham	2–0		3–0	2–5	0–3	3–1	1–0	1–0	3–2	7–0	0–1	5–0	4–2	1–1	2–0	2–0	3–0	5–1	3–3	2–1
Blackburn Rovers	1–1	5–1		4–1	3–0	3–0	1–2	0–0	1–1	1–1	1–0	1–1	1–3	1–2	2–1	3–0	0–3	1–0	3–1	2–0
Bolton Wanderers	4–1	0–1	1–0		4–0	5–0	3–2	3–2	1–3	2–1	1–1	6–0	2–0	1–2	1–2	1–2	6–2	1–0	3–2	6–1
Bury	0–1	1–0	5–0	2–1		0–2	3–2	0–0	2–4	1–1	1–4	2–1	0–0	1–1	2–5	3–0	3–1	2–2	0–1	2–0
Derby County	1–0	0–0	1–2	0–1	3–1		0–0	0–3	1–2	1–1	2–1	2–2	1–1	3–0	1–0	1–0	1–0	2–1	2–0	5–1
Everton	4–2	1–2	3–2	3–1	1–2	2–1		4–2	0–3	4–1	1–2	4–1	6–2	1–0	3–2	0–3	3–1	2–0	2–2	0–1
Liverpool	3–0	2–0	1–3	2–2	3–1	4–1	1–1		0–1	6–1	3–0	4–1	2–0	1–1	3–1	3–1	2–0	2–1	4–0	3–0
Manchester City	1–4	4–1	1–1	3–1	5–2	1–2	1–0	0–1		4–0	1–4	5–0	5–1	0–0	1–2	2–0	5–1	2–1	4–0	1–2
Middlesbrough	1–2	1–0	1–1	4–4	5–1	0–1	0–0	1–5	6–1		1–0	2–0	4–1	1–2	0–1	5–0	2–1	2–2	3–1	2–0
Newcastle United	3–1	2–2	3–0	2–1	3–1	0–1	4–2	2–3	2–2	4–1		3–2	3–1	1–0	2–1	5–0	1–1	0–3	8–0	1–1
Nottingham Forest	2–2	2–1	1–2	4–0	3–2	0–0	4–3	1–2	0–1	2–1	2–1		1–2	1–0	4–1	3–1	1–2	3–4	3–1	3–1
Notts County	2–1	0–0	1–1	3–3	2–2	1–0	0–0	3–0	3–0	1–1	1–0	1–1		2–2	2–3	1–1	4–1	1–3	5–2	1–0
Preston North End	2–0	3–0	2–1	3–0	1–0	3–1	1–1	1–2	2–0	2–1	0–0	3–1	4–1		1–1	2–0	1–1	0–1	3–2	2–2
Sheffield United	1–1	3–0	0–2	5–2	1–1	1–0	3–2	1–2	1–3	1–0	2–0	1–4	1–0	0–0		1–1	4–1	0–2	4–1	3–1
Stoke	0–1	2–2	3–0	1–2	4–2	2–2	2–2	2–1	0–0	1–1	1–0	4–0	3–0	3–0	2–1		1–0	4–0	4–0	2–1
Sunderland	2–0	3–1	3–0	3–3	0–3	2–0	2–1	1–2	2–0	2–1	3–2	0–1	1–3	2–0	2–0	1–0		2–0	7–2	2–2
The Wednesday	2–2	4–2	0–1	1–2	1–1	1–0	3–1	3–2	1–0	3–0	1–1	1–0	3–1	1–1	1–0	2–0	3–3		5–1	4–2
Wolverhampton Wanderers	4–1	0–0	2–1	2–0	2–2	7–0	2–5	0–2	2–3	0–0	0–2	2–1	6–1	2–3	1–1	1–2	5–2	0–0		0–2
Woolwich Arsenal	2–1	5–0	3–2	0–0	4–0	1–0	1–2	3–1	2–0	2–2	4–3	3–1	1–1	2–2	5–1	1–2	2–0	0–2	2–1	

Updated to match(es) played on unknown. Source:
Legend: Blue = home team win; Yellow = draw; Red = away team win.

=== Maps ===
Locations of the Football League First Division teams

== Second Division ==
Football League Second Division
- Season: 1905–06
- Champions: Bristol City (1st title)
- Failed re-election: None
- Matches: 380
- Goals: 1,116 (2.94 per match)
- Top goalscorer: William Maxwell (Bristol City), 27
- Biggest home win: Barnsley 8–1 Chesterfield (20 Jan 1905); Bristol City 7–0 Stockport (20 Jan 1906); Chelsea 7–0 Burslem Port Vale (3 Mar 1906)
- Biggest away win: Leicester Fosse 2–5 Manchester United (29 Mar 1906); Chesterfield 1–4 Grimsby Town (2 Sept 1905); Lincoln City 1–4 Chelsea (14 Oct 1905); Lincoln City 1–4 Hull (23 Dec 1905)
- Highest scoring: Barnsley 8–1 Chesterfield (20 Jan 1905)
- Longest winning run: 14 matches Bristol City (9 Sep 1905 – 2 Dec 1905)
- Longest unbeaten run: 24 matches Bristol City (9 Sep 1905 – 10 Feb 1906)
- Longest losing run: 8 matches Burton United (17 Mar 1906 – 28 Apr 1906)

Pos	Team	Pld	W	D	L	GF	GA	GAv	Pts	Promotion
1	Bristol City (C, P)	38	30	6	2	83	28	2.964	66	Promotion to the First Division
2	Manchester United (P)	38	28	6	4	90	28	3.214	62	Promotion to the First Division
3	Chelsea	38	22	9	7	90	37	2.432	53	
4	West Bromwich Albion	38	22	8	8	79	36	2.194	52	
5	Hull City	38	19	6	13	67	54	1.241	44	
6	Leeds City	38	17	9	12	59	47	1.255	43	
7	Leicester Fosse	38	15	12	11	53	48	1.104	42	
8	Grimsby Town	38	15	10	13	46	46	1.000	40	
9	Burnley	38	15	8	15	42	53	0.792	38	
10	Stockport County	38	13	9	16	44	56	0.786	35	
11	Bradford City	38	13	8	17	46	60	0.767	34	
12	Barnsley	38	12	9	17	60	62	0.968	33	
13	Lincoln City	38	12	6	20	69	72	0.958	30	
14	Blackpool	38	10	9	19	37	62	0.597	29	
15	Gainsborough Trinity	38	12	4	22	44	57	0.772	28	
16	Glossop	38	10	8	20	49	71	0.690	28	
17	Burslem Port Vale	38	12	4	22	49	82	0.598	28	
18	Chesterfield Town	38	10	8	20	40	72	0.556	28	Re-elected
19	Burton United	38	10	6	22	34	67	0.507	26	Re-elected
20	Clapton Orient	38	7	7	24	35	78	0.449	21	Re-elected

(C) Champions; (P) Promoted

=== Results ===
Home \ Away	BAR	BLP	BRA	BRI	BRN	BPV	BRT	CHE	CHF	CLA	GAI	GLP	GRI	HUL	LEE	LEI	LIN	MUN	STP	WBA
Barnsley		1–1	0–1	2–2	1–2	4–0	3–0	1–2	8–1	4–1	2–1	1–1	2–0	2–0	3–0	0–0	4–2	0–3	4–0	3–0
Blackpool	0–0		2–2	1–3	0–1	2–1	2–0	0–1	2–1	3–0	2–2	1–0	2–0	1–2	0–3	0–1	2–0	0–1	2–0	0–3
Bradford City	0–0	2–1		1–2	0–1	2–0	1–0	1–1	1–0	3–0	1–2	2–0	0–1	0–2	1–0	3–3	2–2	1–5	0–1	0–1
Bristol City	3–0	2–1	1–0		2–0	4–0	4–0	2–1	3–1	1–0	2–0	2–1	2–0	2–1	2–0	1–2	1–0	1–1	7–0	1–0
Burnley	2–1	4–1	0–0	2–2		1–3	1–0	2–0	1–1	3–0	1–0	1–0	0–0	1–3	4–3	0–2	2–1	1–3	0–1	0–2
Burslem Port Vale	1–2	1–2	2–1	0–1	2–2		4–1	3–2	4–3	2–1	1–0	3–3	2–2	1–3	2–0	2–0	3–1	1–0	0–0	0–1
Burton United	4–1	1–1	0–1	0–1	1–3	1–0		2–4	4–0	1–0	3–1	1–0	1–0	0–3	1–1	0–0	2–0	0–2	2–0	2–2
Chelsea	6–0	6–0	4–2	0–0	1–0	7–0	3–0		0–1	6–1	1–3	0–0	2–0	5–1	4–0	3–3	4–2	1–1	4–2	1–0
Chesterfield	2–0	2–0	1–1	1–2	3–0	2–0	1–0	0–2		1–1	0–0	3–1	1–4	1–2	0–2	3–3	1–2	1–0	3–1	0–3
Clapton Orient	0–0	0–0	4–2	0–2	3–0	1–3	0–1	0–3	3–3		1–0	2–0	1–2	0–1	0–0	0–2	3–0	0–1	1–0	0–2
Gainsborough Trinity	1–0	0–1	2–3	1–3	0–1	4–0	5–2	0–2	4–0	2–1		2–0	1–0	3–1	4–1	0–1	2–3	2–2	0–0	2–1
Glossop	2–2	4–1	2–3	1–5	1–1	3–2	2–0	2–4	2–0	5–0	1–0		2–0	3–1	1–2	0–0	2–2	1–2	1–0	1–3
Grimsby Town	2–1	1–1	1–0	1–1	2–0	5–0	1–0	1–1	2–0	4–1	2–0	1–1		1–0	1–1	1–1	2–2	0–1	2–0	3–2
Hull City	4–1	2–2	5–2	0–3	1–1	3–2	1–1	4–3	3–0	3–1	2–0	1–2	0–1		0–0	0–0	2–1	0–1	3–0	4–0
Leeds City	3–2	3–0	0–2	1–1	1–1	3–1	2–1	0–0	3–0	6–1	1–0	1–0	3–0	3–1		4–1	2–2	1–3	1–1	0–2
Leicester Fosse	1–0	2–0	2–4	1–2	2–0	2–1	1–1	0–1	1–1	2–1	4–0	2–1	2–0	1–2	0–1		3–1	2–5	2–0	0–0
Lincoln City	4–1	1–1	5–0	0–3	5–0	3–1	5–1	1–4	0–1	2–3	3–0	4–1	3–1	1–4	1–2	3–1		2–3	2–0	1–2
Manchester United	5–1	2–1	0–0	5–1	1–0	3–0	6–0	0–0	4–1	4–0	2–0	5–2	5–0	5–0	0–3	3–2	2–1		3–1	0–0
Stockport County	0–0	2–1	1–0	2–3	3–1	3–0	2–0	1–0	0–0	3–3	2–0	5–0	2–2	2–1	2–1	1–1	3–0	0–1		2–2
West Bromwich Albion	5–3	5–0	6–1	1–3	1–2	4–1	3–0	1–1	3–0	1–1	4–0	6–0	2–0	1–1	2–1	3–0	1–1	1–0	3–1	

Updated to match(es) played on unknown. Source: Ian Laschke: Rothmans Book of Football League Records 1888–89 to 1978–79. Macdonald and Jane’s, London & Sydney, 1980.
Legend: Blue = home team win; Yellow = draw; Red = away team win.

=== Maps ===
Locations of the Football League Second Division teams

== Attendances ==
=== Division One ===
No.	Club	Average
1	Newcastle United FC	22,765
2	Aston Villa FC	20,735
3	Bolton Wanderers FC	19,930
4	Liverpool FC	18,480
5	Manchester City FC	17,560
6	Woolwich Arsenal	16,105
7	Everton FC	15,920
8	Sheffield United FC	13,685
9	Sunderland AFC	13,015
10	Blackburn Rovers FC	12,920
11	Middlesbrough FC	12,650
12	Birmingham City FC	11,960
13	The Wednesday	11,875
14	Notts County FC	10,485
15	Preston North End FC	9,485
16	Nottingham Forest FC	9,265
17	Bury FC	9,140
18	Stoke City FC	8,610
19	Derby County FC	7,510
20	Wolverhampton Wanderers FC	6,490

== See also ==
- 1905–06 in English football
- 1905 in association football
- 1906 in association football
