= St. Andrew's Anglican Church (San Ignacio) =

Coordinates: 17.159335°N 89.070324°W

St. Andrew's Church
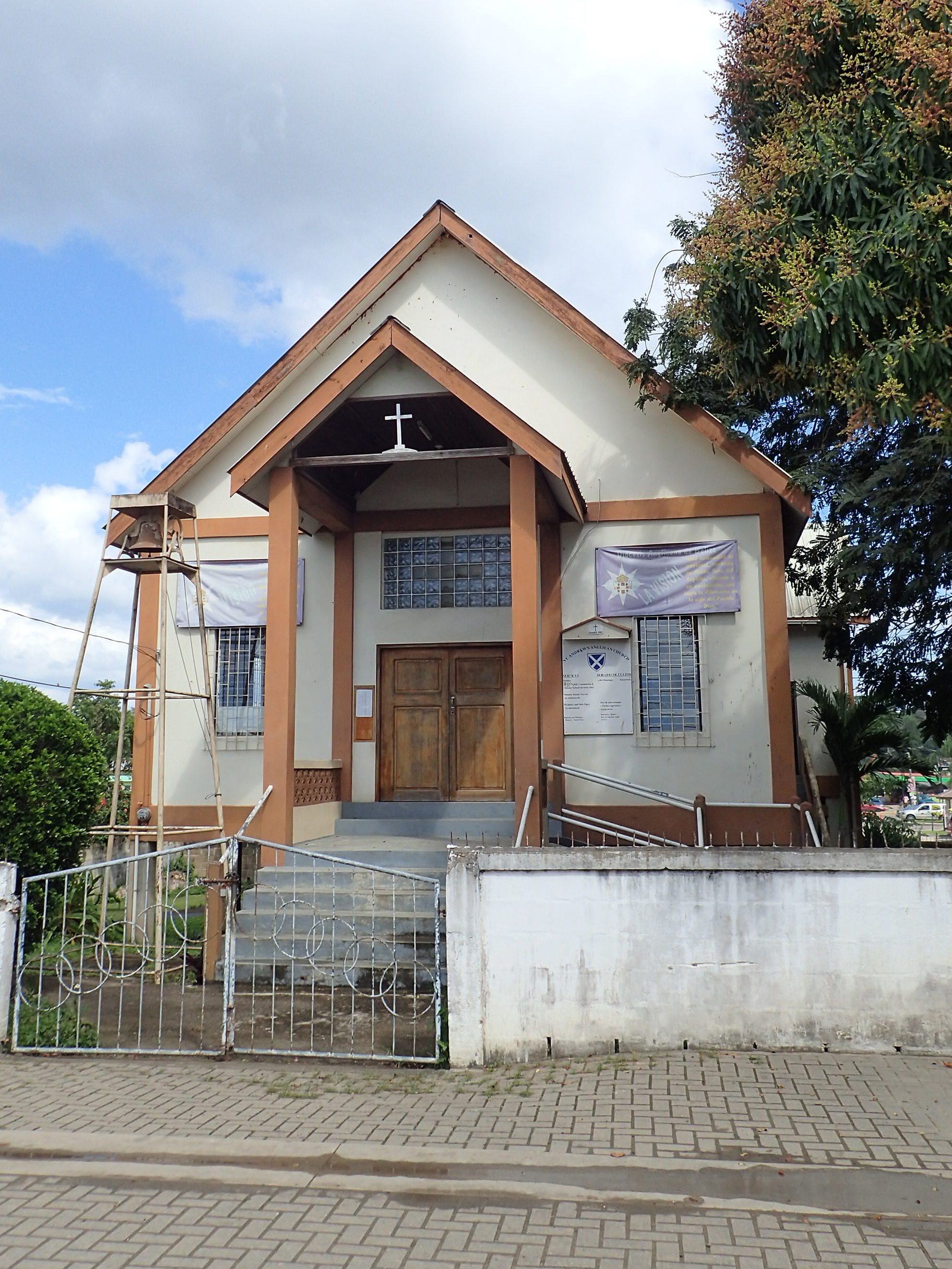
- St. Andrew's Anglican Church in 2017
- St. Andrew's Church
- Location: Burns Avenue, San Ignacio, Belize
- Denomination: Anglican Diocese of Belize

History
- Founded: 1905

Clergy
- Bishop: Philip S. Wright

Founded in 1905, St. Andrew's Church is an active Anglican congregation located on Burns Avenue in San Ignacio, Belize.

== History ==
St. Andrew's Church, a part of the Anglican Diocese of Belize, has played an influential role in San Ignacio's rich history. Its mission and ministry have always been located in the downtown area of San Ignacio, with its first house of worship founded on Far West Street. The first priest was the Rev'd C.G. MacArthur, serving from 1905 until 1907. In 1907 a vibrant young Belizean by the name of William Robert Hope took over leadership as deacon. Mr. Hope went on to become Canon William Hope, rector of San Ignacio, and the first ordained Belizean priest in the Diocese of Belize. He faithfully served St. Andrew's parish from 1907 until 1918. With a land donation from Mr. John O. Waight, the church and congregation moved to its present location on Burns Avenue in 1918, and Canon Hope was called to serve another church in Gales Point. The congregation of St. Andrew's worshipped in temporary quarters, until a beautiful wooden sanctuary was finally completed near year's end 1925 and consecrated by the bishop on Sunday, February 28, 1926. The Rev'd Arnold Stackhouse was priest-in-charge at the time. This church became known as the second St. Andrew's Church. A rectory was soon built in front of the church, and an already existing school building (on the grounds of where the church's community centre now stands) would receive renovations.

On Easter Monday, April 13, 1998, the second St. Andrew's Church was demolished, due to irreparable damage by termites. A new concrete sanctuary was built between April 27 and November 7, 1998. The task of fundraising began in 1995 under the leadership of English priest, the Rev'd Ian Hutchinson Cervantes (1994–1997), and it continued with another English priest, the Rev'd Mark Rogers from 1997 (1997–2000). The sanctuary was designed by Bimco and constructed by Mr. Marcus Chen. It was dedicated on November 8, 1998, by the Right Rev'd Sylvester Romero Palma, then bishop of Belize.

== Worship ==
Throughout the church's physical changes the altar has remained as the original centerpiece for worship. Canon Hope was instrumental in procuring a donation from England of three beautifully carved panels for the altar. The altar itself was constructed as a gift by Mr. James Massiah for the church's consecration in 1926. The three carved panels display both grapevines (representing communion wine and the blood of Christ) and sheaves of wheat (communion bread and the body of Christ).

St. Andrew's has a long list of distinguished service from priests. However, in most instances, a priest has not served longer than three to four years (notable exceptions being Canon Leroy Flowers, who with his family served St. Andrew's from 1980–1986, and the Rev'd Juan B. Marentes, who served St. Andrew's from 2009-2014). Thus, while priests have come and gone, the congregation and its lay leadership have brought the church into the 21st century.

St. Andrew's is currently served by the Right Rev'd Philip Wright, bishop of Belize, and Rev'd David B. Alenskis, priest-in-charge and missionary in connection with SAMS-USA.
