= Philip Cecil =

Dean of Belize

Philip Henry Cecil (27 July 1918 – 11 March 1977) was the Dean of Belize from 1948 to 1951.

Lewis was educated at King Edward VII School, Sheffield, the City of London School, King's College London and Westcott House, Cambridge. He was ordained Deacon in 1941, and Priest in 1942. After a curacy in Leeds he was Precentor and Sacrist at Durham Cathedral then Dean of Belize. On his return from British Honduras he held incumbencies in London, Wormley and Bushey Heath. From 1963 to 1967 he was Principal of Bishop's College, Cheshunt. After this he was Vicar of Cockayne Hatley until 1972 when he became a Residentiary Canon (and Treasurer) of Peterborough Cathedral.
