= Religion in Belize =

Religion in Belize (2022 census)
1. Catholic (31.8%)
2. Pentecostal (9.20%)
3. Other Christian (22.6%)
4. Other religion (6.30%)
5. No religion (31.0%)

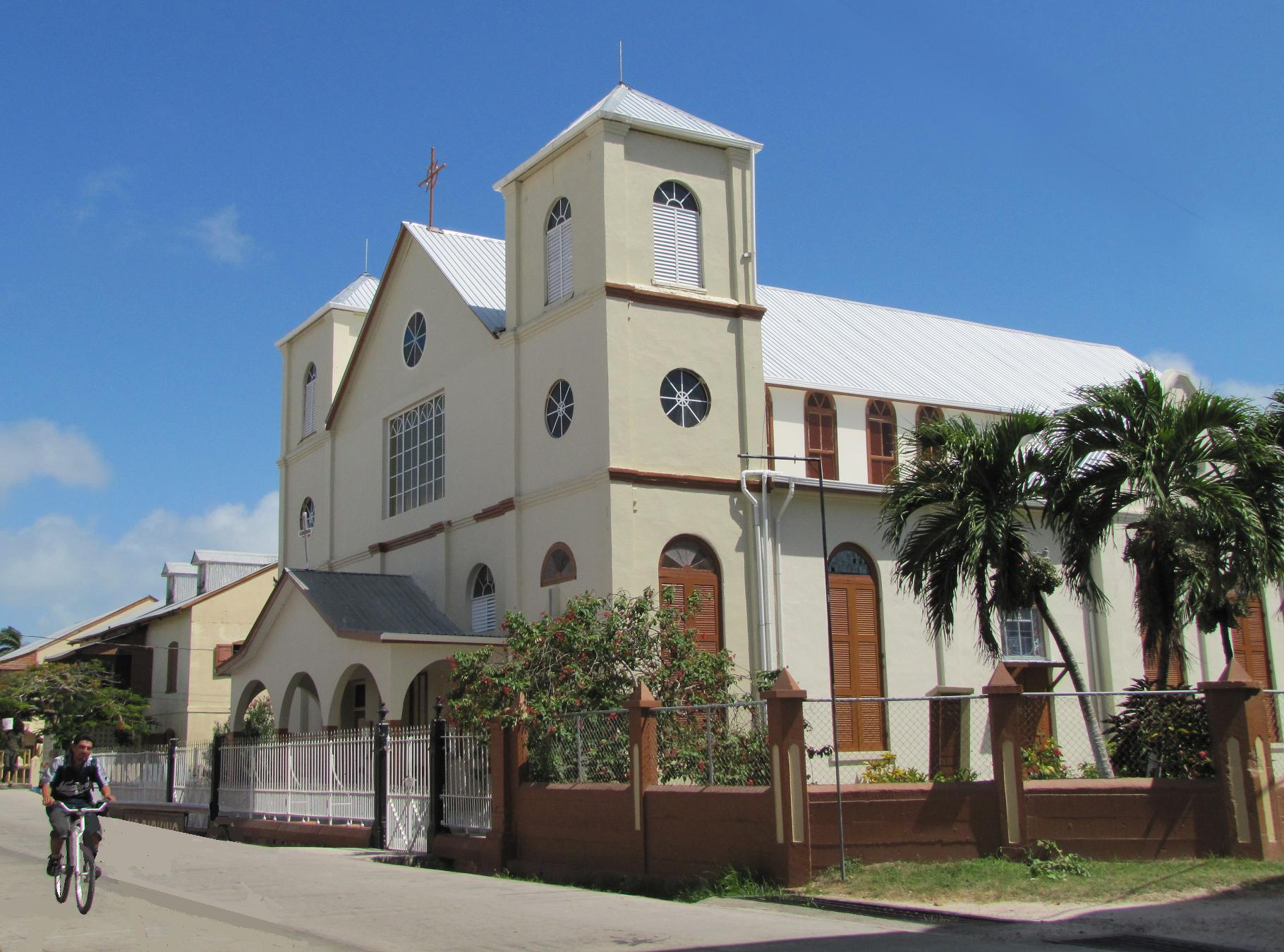
Holy Redeemer Cathedral in Belize City, built 1858

Christianity is followed by majority of the population of Belize. The single largest denomination is the Catholic Church with about 31.8% of the population a decline from 40.1% in 2011 and 62% in 1980. A third of the population does not profess a religion, their population share has doubled from 15.5% in 2010 to 31.0% in 2022. Other major Christian denominations include Pentecostal (9.2%), Seventh-day Adventists (5.4%), Anglican Church(4%), Baptist (5.6%) Mennonites (3.9%). About 6.3 % follows others religions like Baháʼí Faith, Buddhism, Hinduism, Muslims etc.

Belizean Catholic churches belong to the Diocese of Belize City-Belmopan; Anglican churches belong to the Diocese of Belize, part of the Church in the Province of the West Indies. Catholics frequently visit the country for special gospel revivals. The Greek Orthodox Church has a presence in Santa Elena.

== Religious freedom ==
The Constitution of Belize establishes the freedom of religion. Discrimination on religious grounds is illegal. A law against blasphemy is unenforced. The Belize Council of Churches and the Belize Association of Evangelical Churches appoint one senator to the senate of Belize with the approval of the Governor-General. The law also establishes that prisoners in jails must have their religious beliefs respected and accommodated.

Religious groups are required to register with the government in order to operate in the country. Religious groups are exempt from certain taxes. Foreign religious workers are required to purchase a religious worker's permit and register with the government.

The public school curriculum for primary schools includes nondenominational "spirituality" classes that introduce world religions, as well as ethics and morals associated with religion; in 2022 there were issues regarding children with traditional Rastafari hairstyles attending some schools. Most public schools are managed by Christian churches. A few schools are run by non-Christian religious groups.

== Demographics ==
Main religious denominations in Belize
	2000^{1}		2010^{2}		2022^{3}	
	Number	%	Number	%	Number	%
Total population	232,111		304,106		397,483	
Christian	193,150	83.3	226,515	74.3	244,855	61.6
Catholic	123,057	49.4	129,456	40.1	126,596	31.8
Total Protestant	78,115	31.8	103,505	31.8	113,782	29.8
Anglican	13,647	5.5	15,065	4.7	15,943	4.0
Baptist	8,703	3.5	11,620	3.6	14,108	3.6
Mennonite	10,064	4.0	12,053	3.7	15,440	3.9
Methodist	8,801	3.5	9,457	2.9	6,623	1.7
Nazarene	6,563	2.6	9,145	2.8	6,568	1.6
Pentecostal	18,348	7.4	27,121	8.4	36,459	9.2
Seventh-day Adventist	13,061	5.2	17,559	5.4	18,641	4.7
Salvation Army	409	0.2	400	0.1	-	-
Jehovah’s Witnesses	3,618	1.5	5,386	1.7	4,477	1.1
Mormon	999	0.4	1,333	0.4	-	-
No religious affiliation	23,304	9.4	49,975	15.5	123 372	31.0
Buddhist	-	-	820	0.3	-	-
Muslim	266	0.1	622	0.2	-	-
Hindu	402	0.2	652	0.2	-	-
Bahai	219	0.1	216	0.1	-	-
Other	15,966	6.4	28,976	9.0	25,116	6.3
No response	1,367	0.6	756	0.3	4,134	1.0

=== By Region ===
According to the 2022 Census, the highest proportion of population following Roman Catholicism is in Corozal District (37.9%) and Orange Walk District (37.3%) while Pentecostalism has its highest proportion in Cayo District (14.9%).

Stann Creek District has the highest percentage of people withour religion at 46.6% and lowest at Toledo District (21.7%).

Religion	Belize	Corozal District	Orange Walk District	Belize District	Cayo District	Stann Creek District	Toledo District
Roman Catholic	31.8%	37.9%	37.3%	33.4%	27.2%	26.1%	31.7%
Pentecostal	9.2%	5.3%	7.5%	5.5%	14.9%	8.4%	13.3%
Seventh Day Adventist	4.7%	10.4%	4.0%	5.1%	4.1%	2.7%	1.6%
Anglican	4.0%	1.4%	2.0%	8.6%	2.4%	3.3%	1.3%
Mennonite	3.9%	8.9%	9.9%	0.5%	4.2%	0.5%	2.8%
Baptist	3.5%	1.8%	0.9%	3.6%	1.9%	5.0%	12.0%
Methodist	1.7%	0.8%	0.2%	4.1%	0.5%	1.1%	1.3%
Nazarene	1.7%	1.3%	0.1%	1.1%	1.9%	1.9%	4.8%
Jehovah’s Witness	1.1%	1.4%	1.4%	1.1%	1.1%	1.0%	0.7%
Other	6.3%	7.2%	11.9%	4.5%	6.0%	2.7%	8.4%
None	31.0%	22.8%	24.2%	30.8%	34.7%	46.6%	21.7%
Don’t Know/Not Stated	1.0%	0.7%	0.6%	1.7%	1.0%	0.9%	0.3%

== Minority faiths ==
=== Islam ===
Islam is one of the smallest minority faiths in Belize, which is a predominantly Christian country. There is an estimated total Muslim population of 577, representing 0.2 percent of the total population. There is an Islamic mission of Belize (IMB) headquartered in Belize City. Ahmadiya Muslim Jama’at built Masjid Noor in Belize City is situated on George Price Highway. They have mosques in Belmopan and Orange Walk.

The Muslim Community Primary School (MCPS) was recognised by the government in 1978 and offers Islamic as well as elementary level academic courses to Muslim and non-Muslim children.

=== Hinduism ===
Hinduism is a minority faith in Belize. According to 2010 census, 0.2% of Belize population is Hindu. It is followed mainly by the Indo-Belizeans. The Hindu community in Belize today consists mostly of families who arrived in the 1950s, when Belize was still a British colony. The community is composed almost entirely of Sindhis/ Indo-Pakistanis and so there are few cultural differences within it.

There are two Hindu temples in Belize, the Belize Hindu Temple on Albert Street, Belize city and Sukh Shanti Temple, Corozal. Festivals like Diwali and Janamasthami are celebrated by the Hindus in Belize.

=== Bahai ===
They estimate there were 7,776 Baháʼís in Belize in that year, as well as the highest proportion of Baháʼís in any country (though not nearly the highest absolute number). The 2010 Belize Population Census, however, recorded only 202 Baháʼís out of a total population of 304,106, yielding a proportion of 0.066%, far less than 2.5%.

== See also ==
- Catholic Church in Belize
- List of churches in Belize
- Mennonites in Belize
