= Henry Holme =

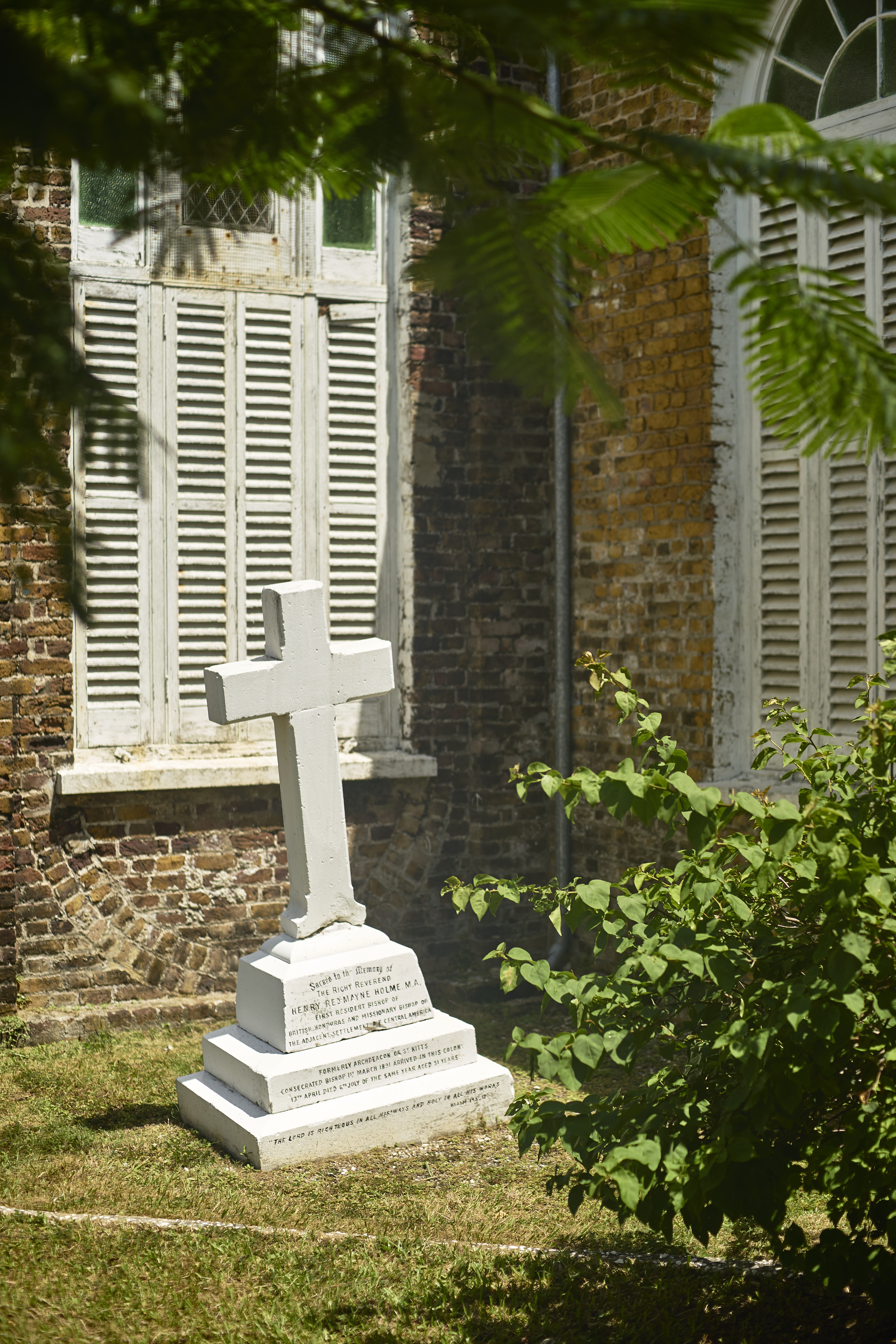
Henry R. Holme memorial in the garden of St. John's Cathedral, Belize City

Henry Redmayne Holme (8 November 1839 in Kirk Leatham – 6 July 1891 at Basseterre) was an Anglican bishop in the late 19th century.

Of a Yorkshire family, Henry Redmayne Holme was son of the Rev. James Holme. He was educated at Christ's College, Cambridge, graduating B.A. in 1868. Ordained in 1868, his first posts were curacies in Attercliffe and Lythe. From 1875 to 1881, he was Vicar of St Anthony's Montserrat, and from 1882 to 1891 Vicar of St George's, Basseterre, and Chaplain to the Bishop of Antigua; he was also Archdeacon of St Kitts from 1885 to 1891. In 1891, he was appointed Bishop of British Honduras. Consecrated on 1 March, he died in a shipwreck four months later. There is a memorial to him at Belize's Anglican cathedral.

Religious titles
Preceded by Enos Nuttall	Bishop of British Honduras; March 1891 – July 1891	Succeeded by George Albert Ormsby
