= Frederic Murray =

Frederic Murray may refer to:

- Feg Murray (1894–1973), American athlete
- Frederic Murray (priest), Archdeacon of Belize
