= Philip S. Wright =

Belizean Anglican bishop (born 1967)

The Most Reverend Philip Wright
- Archbishop of the West Indies; Bishop of Belize
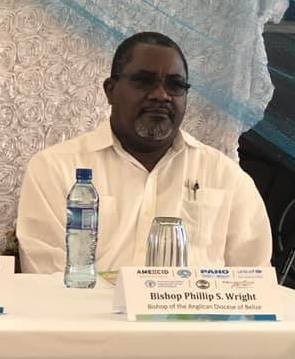
- in 2019
- Church: Church in the Province of the West Indies
- Province: West Indies
- Diocese: Belize
- Predecessor: Howard Gregory (as archbishop)

Orders
- Ordination: 6 August 1992 (deacon); 2 March 1993 (priest) by Sylvester Romero Palma
- Consecration: 17 November 2005 by Drexel Gomez

Personal details
- Born: Philip Silvin Wright; 10 February 1967 (age 59) Belize City, British Honduras
- Denomination: Anglicanism
- Parents: Philip Sydney Wright; Loretta Idolly Wright
- Spouse: Carla Suite (m. 2009)
- Occupation: Board of Governors of the University of Belize
- Profession: Bishop, theologian
- Education: Codrington College diploma; University of the West Indies BA(hons); University of Birmingham MA

Philip Silvin Wright (born 1967, Belize City) is a Belizean Anglican bishop. He was appointed the bishop of the Anglican Diocese of Belize in 2005 and the Archbishop of the West Indies in 2025.

== Biography ==
He attended Wesley College and Belize Technical College before teaching at Nazareen High School and at the Belize Technical College. After studying at Codrington College, he was ordained as a priest in 1993. He is the incumbent of St. Andrew's Anglican Church (San Ignacio).

In September 2022, he was elected as one of eight presidents of the World Council of Churches, at the 11th WCC Assembly, held in Karlsruhe, Germany. In this role, he represents the region of the Caribbean and Latin America.

In November 2025, Wright was elected to succeed Howard Gregory as Archbishop of the West Indies. He was installed as Primate at the Belize Civic Centre on April 26, 2026.
