= Gerald Brooks =

Gerald Henry Brooks (February 11, 1905 – December 12, 1974) was an Anglican bishop in the third quarter of the 20th century.

He was educated at Tonbridge School and Keble College, Oxford and ordained in 1931. His first post was a curacy at St Saviour's, Poplar. He was Domestic Chaplain to John Dauglish, Bishop of Nassau, from 1932 to 1934 and then Priest in charge of All Saints, Andros, Bahamas until 1940. Later he was Archdeacon of Nassau and from 1950 to 1966 the tenth Bishop of British Honduras.

Religious titles
Preceded by Douglas Wilson	Bishop of British Honduras; 1950–1966	Succeeded by Benjamin Vaughan
