= Archdeacon of Belize =

The Archdeacon of Belize is a senior ecclesiastical post within the Anglican Diocese of Belize; and as such is responsible for the disciplinary supervision of the clergy within its boundaries.

== List of archdeacons ==
- A. R. Swaby
- Frederic Richardson Murray
- George Henry Hogbin
- Ronald Arthur Frederick Pratt
- Gilbert Rodwell Hulse
- Rowland Wilfred Taylor
- Eldon Anthony Sylvester
