= George Hogbin =

George Henry Hogbin was an Anglican priest in the late nineteenth and early twentieth centuries.

Hogbin was ordained in 1894 and spent the initial portion of his ministry in Canada. He held incumbencies at Battleford, Fish Creek, and Banff. After this he was the Archdeacon of Calgary and then Archdeacon of Belize from 1918 to 1931. In 1926, during his time in Belize, the brick upper section of the tower of St. John's Cathedral was built.

He died on September 7, 1937.
