= Hogben =

Hogben is a surname. Notable people with the surname include:

- Hogben (Kent cricketer) (fl. 1780s), English cricketer known only by his surname
- Alia Hogben, Canadian social worker and Muslim women activist
- Edward Hewlett Hogben (1875 – 1936), Australian architect
- Frances Hogben (born 1937), British Olympic swimmer
- George Hogben (1853 – 1920), New Zealand educationalist and seismologist
- Horace Hogben (1888 – 1975), Australian politician
- Lancelot Hogben (1895–1975), British zoologist, medical statistician and popular science writer
- Lawrence Hogben (1916–2015), British/New Zealand Royal Navy officer, scientist and mathematician
- Leslie Hogben, American mathematician
- Michael Hogben (born 1952), British auctioneer, antiques dealer, author and TV personality
- Peter Hogben (1925 – 2011) Archdeacon of Dorking

== Fictional characters ==
- Hogben family from Hogben series, science fiction comedy short stories & novel
- Engineer Hogben from The First Men in the Moon (1919 film)

== See also ==
- Hogben toad (disambiguation)
