= Douglas Wilson (bishop) =

Anglican bishop

Douglas John Wilson (22 June 1903 – 30 November 1980) was an eminent Anglican bishop in the mid-20th century.

Born into an ecclesiastical family – his father was J. K. Wilson, sometime canon, and Vicar of Bromley – he was educated at Haileybury and Queens' College, Cambridge. Ordained in 1928 he was successively a curate at Dartford, Vicar of Kingswinford and Archdeacon of Central America before his elevation to the episcopate as an assistant bishop of British Honduras (1938–1944). He returned to England and was an assistant bishop of Southwell, 1944–1945.

He became diocesan bishop of British Honduras in 1945 before translation to Trinidad in 1950. He returned to England again as a canon residentiary of Wells Cathedral in 1956. As canon, he served as treasurer; he was also commissioned assistant bishop of Bath and Wells in 1956. He retired from all his posts and moved to Beaminster in 1973. His widow, Mary, died in 2009.

Anglican Communion titles
Preceded by James Hughes	Bishop of British Honduras; 1945 – 1950	Succeeded by Gerald Brooks
Preceded by Fabian Jackson	Bishop of Trinidad; 1950 – 1956	Succeeded by Noel Chamberlain
