= Henry Ormsby =

Irish lawyer and judge

Henry Wilmot Ormsby PC, QC (1812 – 1887) was an Irish lawyer and judge.

Ormsby was born at Powerscourt, County Wicklow, the fourth son of the Reverend Henry Ormsby and his wife Margaret Sandys, daughter of the Reverend Michael Sandys. He was educated at Trinity College Dublin, called to the Bar in 1835 and appointed a Queen's Counsel in 1858. He was Solicitor-General for Ireland in 1868 and again in 1874 and Attorney-General for Ireland in 1875. Later that year he was appointed judge of the Landed Estates Court; he became a judge of the Chancery Division of the High Court of Justice in Ireland in 1878, retiring in 1885.

Ormsby married his first cousin Julia Hamilton, daughter of Henry Hamilton of Tullylish House, County Down and Sarah Sandys (a sister of Ormsby's mother), in 1840. They had five children who reached adulthood, of whom the eldest son Montague predeceased his father. Their second son George Albert Ormsby was Bishop of British Honduras 1893–1908, and their third son Edwin was Rector of Hartlepool, County Durham for many years.

Legal offices
| Preceded by John Thomas Ball | Solicitor-General for Ireland; 1868 | Succeeded by Charles Robert Barry |
| Preceded by Hugh Law | Solicitor-General for Ireland; 1874–1875 | Succeeded by Hon. David Plunket |
| Preceded by John Thomas Ball | Attorney-General for Ireland; January–November 1875 | Succeeded by George Augustus Chichester May |
