= George Ormsby (bishop) =

Irish bishop (1843–1924)

The Right Reverend George Ormsby
- Archdeacon of Lindisfarne
- Church: Church of England
- In office: 1914 to 1924
- Predecessor: Henry Hodgson
- Successor: Robert Mangin
- Other post: Acting Bishop of Newcastle (1914)
- Previous post: Bishop of British Honduras (1893–1907)

Orders
- Ordination: 1866
- Consecration: c. 1893

Personal details
- Born: 1843
- Died: 14 February 1924 (aged 80–81)

George Albert Ormsby (1843–1924) was an Anglican bishop at the end of the 19th century and the first decades of the 20th century.

== Background and family ==
Ormsby was born in Dublin in September 1843, the second son of the Rt Hon Henry Ormsby, Chancery Judge of the High Court of Justice in Ireland, and his wife and first cousin Julia Hamilton. His brother, Edwin, was a long-serving Rector of Hartlepool, 1874-1915, including at the time of the bombardment of the town by the German navy in 1914.

He married in 1871 Ellen Scotland, daughter of Canon Scotland, and had several children, including a son Montague Ormsby. Their daughter Millicent Aileen Ormsby married in February 1903 a relative, Oswald Christian Ormsby, son of Rev W. G. Ormsby.

== Biography ==
He was educated at Trinity College, Dublin, and ordained in 1866. His first post was a curacy in Eglingham after which he held incumbencies in Jarrow, Rainton and Walworth.

He was the second Bishop of British Honduras from 1893 to 1907. He returned to England and ended his career as Archdeacon of Lindisfarne (collated 1914). He was acting Bishop of Newcastle in August 1914, when the Great War broke out, and served for a second term as acting bishop between the resignation of the bishop, Norman Straton, and the appointment of his successor, Herbert Wild, in 1916. Like Straton and Wild, Ormsby was a strong supporter of British participation in the War. 'Men and women have begun to realise the greatness of the cause...The cause of justice and righteousness and truth and freedom is one and the same everywhere, and without the unfeigned desire for these fellowship and progress may be but empty names.'

A Sub-Prelate of the Order of St John of Jerusalem, he died on 14 February 1924.

Religious titles
Preceded by Henry Redmayne Holme	Bishop of British Honduras; 1893 – 1907	Succeeded by Herbert Bury
