= 1906–07 Football League =

19th season of the Football League

The Football League
- Season: 1906–07
- Champions: Newcastle United
- Relegated: Burton United
- Resigned: Burslem Port Vale

The 1906–07 season was the 19th season of The Football League.

== Final league tables ==
Beginning in the 1894–95 season, clubs finishing level on points were separated according to goal average (goals scored divided by goals conceded). In case one or more teams had the same goal difference, this system favoured those teams who had scored fewer goals. The goal average system was eventually scrapped beginning with the 1976–77 season.

During the first six seasons of the league, (up to the 1893–94 season), re-election process concerned the clubs which finished in the bottom four of the league. From the 1894–95 season and until the 1920–21 season the re-election process was required of the clubs which finished in the bottom three of the league.

== First Division ==
First Division
- Season: 1906–07
- Champions: Newcastle United; 2nd English title
- Relegated: Derby County; Stoke
- Matches: 380
- Goals: 1,148 (3.02 per match)
- Top goalscorer: Alex Young (30 goals)
- Biggest home win: Everton 9–1 Manchester City (3 September 1906)
- Biggest away win: Manchester City 1–4 Woolwich Arsenal (1 September 1906); Sheffield United 1–4 Manchester City (23 March 1907)
- Highest scoring: Everton 9–1 Manchester City (3 September 1906); Sunderland 5–5 Liverpool (19 January 1907)
- Longest winning run: 6 matches Everton
- Longest unbeaten run: 13 matches Bristol City
- Longest losing run: 5 matches Bury; Derby County; Liverpool; Preston North End; The Wednesday
- Highest attendance: 60,000; Birmingham 3–2 Aston Villa (19 January 1907)
- Lowest attendance: 1,000; Manchester United 2–0 Sunderland (25 March 1907)
- Average attendance: 16,294

Pos	Team	Pld	W	D	L	GF	GA	GAv	Pts	Relegation
1	Newcastle United (C)	38	22	7	9	74	46	1.609	51	
2	Bristol City	38	20	8	10	66	47	1.404	48	
3	Everton	38	20	5	13	70	46	1.522	45	
4	Sheffield United	38	17	11	10	57	55	1.036	45	
5	Aston Villa	38	19	6	13	78	52	1.500	44	
6	Bolton Wanderers	38	18	8	12	59	47	1.255	44	
7	Woolwich Arsenal	38	20	4	14	66	59	1.119	44	
8	Manchester United	38	17	8	13	53	56	0.946	42	
9	Birmingham	38	15	8	15	52	52	1.000	38	
10	Sunderland	38	14	9	15	65	66	0.985	37	
11	Middlesbrough	38	15	6	17	56	63	0.889	36	
12	Blackburn Rovers	38	14	7	17	56	59	0.949	35	
13	The Wednesday	38	12	11	15	49	60	0.817	35	
14	Preston North End	38	14	7	17	44	57	0.772	35	
15	Liverpool	38	13	7	18	64	65	0.985	33	
16	Bury	38	13	6	19	58	68	0.853	32	
17	Manchester City	38	10	12	16	53	77	0.688	32	
18	Notts County	38	8	15	15	46	50	0.920	31	
19	Derby County (R)	38	9	9	20	41	59	0.695	27	Relegation to the Second Division
20	Stoke (R)	38	8	10	20	41	64	0.641	26	Relegation to the Second Division

Source: World Football
Rules for classification: 1) Points; 2) Goal average; 3) Goals scored
(C) Champions; (R) Relegated

=== Results ===
Home \ Away	AST	BIR	BLB	BOL	BRI	BRY	DER	EVE	LIV	MCI	MUN	MID	NEW	NTC	PNE	SHU	STK	SUN	WED	WOO
Aston Villa		4–1	4–2	0–2	3–2	3–1	2–0	2–1	4–0	4–1	2–0	2–3	0–0	0–0	3–0	5–1	1–0	2–2	8–1	2–2
Birmingham	3–2		2–0	4–2	2–2	3–1	2–1	1–0	2–1	4–0	1–1	0–0	2–4	2–0	3–0	0–0	2–1	2–0	1–1	5–1
Blackburn Rovers	2–1	1–0		2–3	0–1	4–1	5–1	2–1	1–1	4–0	2–4	4–1	4–0	0–2	1–1	1–1	3–1	2–1	0–2	2–3
Bolton Wanderers	1–2	2–3	5–2		1–2	1–0	1–0	1–3	3–0	1–1	0–1	1–0	4–2	0–0	3–0	6–1	1–1	1–0	0–0	3–0
Bristol City	2–4	0–0	3–0	1–2		2–0	3–0	2–1	3–1	2–0	1–2	3–0	2–1	1–0	1–0	3–3	4–0	1–1	2–0	1–3
Bury	0–3	1–0	0–0	2–3	1–1		1–0	1–2	1–3	3–1	1–2	1–1	3–2	3–0	2–0	2–1	2–0	2–3	0–0	4–1
Derby County	0–1	1–1	2–3	0–1	1–3	2–1		5–2	0–1	2–2	2–2	1–0	0–0	3–0	3–0	3–0	2–1	1–1	1–0	0–0
Everton	1–2	3–0	2–0	1–0	2–0	1–0	2–0		0–0	9–1	3–0	5–1	3–0	2–2	1–0	4–2	3–0	4–1	2–0	2–1
Liverpool	5–2	2–0	0–2	0–2	2–4	2–2	2–0	1–2		5–4	0–1	2–4	4–1	5–1	6–1	2–2	1–0	1–2	1–2	4–0
Manchester City	4–2	1–0	0–0	1–1	0–1	2–2	2–2	3–1	1–0		3–0	3–1	1–1	2–1	1–1	0–2	2–2	2–3	0–1	1–4
Manchester United	1–0	2–1	1–1	1–2	0–0	2–4	1–1	3–0	0–0	1–1		3–1	1–3	0–0	3–0	2–0	4–1	2–0	5–0	1–0
Middlesbrough	1–0	1–0	0–1	0–0	1–0	3–1	4–1	2–2	0–1	2–3	2–0		0–3	2–0	2–1	0–1	5–0	2–1	1–3	5–3
Newcastle United	3–2	2–0	3–1	4–0	3–0	3–2	2–0	1–0	2–0	2–0	5–0	4–0		4–3	2–1	0–0	1–0	4–2	5–1	1–0
Notts County	1–1	2–2	1–2	0–0	2–3	1–2	4–0	0–1	2–0	0–0	3–0	2–2	1–0		0–0	4–0	2–2	0–0	2–2	4–1
Preston North End	2–0	2–0	1–0	3–1	3–1	3–2	1–0	1–1	3–1	1–3	2–0	4–2	2–2	0–0		2–1	2–2	2–0	1–0	0–3
Sheffield United	0–0	2–0	3–0	2–1	1–1	3–0	2–0	4–1	1–0	1–4	0–2	1–1	0–0	2–1	3–1		2–0	3–2	2–1	4–2
Stoke	0–2	3–0	1–1	3–0	0–3	3–1	2–1	2–0	1–1	3–0	1–2	0–2	1–2	1–1	0–2	1–1		2–2	1–1	2–0
Sunderland	2–1	4–1	1–0	1–2	3–3	3–5	0–2	1–0	5–5	1–1	4–1	4–2	2–0	3–1	1–0	1–2	3–1		1–1	2–3
The Wednesday	2–1	0–1	3–1	2–0	3–0	1–2	1–1	1–1	2–3	3–1	5–2	0–2	2–2	1–3	2–1	2–2	0–1	2–1		1–1
Woolwich Arsenal	3–1	2–1	2–0	2–2	1–2	3–1	3–2	3–1	2–1	4–1	4–0	2–0	2–0	1–0	1–0	0–1	2–1	0–1	1–0	

Updated to match(es) played on unknown. Source:
Legend: Blue = home team win; Yellow = draw; Red = away team win.
- The match between Woolwich Arsenal and Manchester City on the 1st of September 1906 was played during a heatwave. The heat affected City - at half-time they had only 8 fit players, and they finished the match with just 6 fit players, losing 4-1.

=== Maps ===
Locations of the Football League First Division teams

== Second Division ==
Football League Second Division
- Season: 1906–07
- Champions: Nottingham Forest (1st title)
- Failed re-election: Burton United
- Matches: 380
- Goals: 1,155 (3.04 per match)
- Top goalscorer: Fred Shinton (West Bromwich Albion), 28
- Biggest home win: Chelsea–Glossop 9–2 (1 Sept 1906)
- Biggest away win: Lincoln City – Chelsea 0–5 (16 Feb 1907)
- Highest scoring: Chelsea–Glossop 9–2 (1 Sept 1906)
- Longest winning run: 7 matches Nottingham Forest (20 Oct 1906 – 1 Dec 1906)
- Longest unbeaten run: 17 matches Nottingham Forest (19 Jan 1907 – 24 Apr 1907)
- Longest losing run: 5 matches Barnsley (8 Sep 1906 – 6 Oct 1906); Lincoln City (10 Nov 1906 – 8 Dec 1906) (1 Apr 1907 – 24 Apr 1907); Leeds City (27 Oct 1906 – 24 Nov 1906)

Pos	Team	Pld	W	D	L	GF	GA	GAv	Pts	Promotion or relegation
1	Nottingham Forest (C, P)	38	28	4	6	74	36	2.056	60	Promotion to the First Division
2	Chelsea (P)	38	26	5	7	80	34	2.353	57	Promotion to the First Division
3	Leicester Fosse	38	20	8	10	62	39	1.590	48	
4	West Bromwich Albion	38	21	5	12	83	45	1.844	47	
5	Bradford City	38	21	5	12	70	53	1.321	47	
6	Wolverhampton Wanderers	38	17	7	14	66	53	1.245	41	
7	Burnley	38	17	6	15	62	47	1.319	40	
8	Barnsley	38	15	8	15	73	55	1.327	38	
9	Hull City	38	15	7	16	65	57	1.140	37	
10	Leeds City	38	13	10	15	55	63	0.873	36	
11	Grimsby Town	38	16	3	19	57	62	0.919	35	
12	Stockport County	38	12	11	15	42	52	0.808	35	
13	Blackpool	38	11	11	16	33	51	0.647	33	
14	Gainsborough Trinity	38	14	5	19	45	72	0.625	33	
15	Glossop	38	13	6	19	53	79	0.671	32	
16	Burslem Port Vale (R)	38	12	7	19	60	83	0.723	31	Resigned from the league
17	Clapton Orient	38	11	8	19	45	67	0.672	30	
18	Chesterfield Town	38	11	7	20	50	66	0.758	29	Re-elected
19	Lincoln City	38	12	4	22	46	73	0.630	28	Re-elected
20	Burton United (R)	38	8	7	23	34	68	0.500	23	Failed re-election and demoted

(C) Champions; (P) Promoted; (R) Relegated

=== Results ===
Home \ Away	BAR	BLP	BRA	BRN	BPV	BRT	CHE	CHF	CLA	GAI	GLP	GRI	HUL	LEE	LEI	LIN	NOT	STP	WBA	WOL
Barnsley		3–2	3–1	5–0	3–2	6–1	3–1	2–1	3–2	6–0	3–0	1–1	4–2	3–0	2–2	6–2	0–1	3–1	0–1	0–1
Blackpool	2–3		1–0	2–0	0–1	1–1	0–0	0–0	1–3	1–0	4–1	4–3	1–1	1–0	1–0	2–0	1–2	0–1	2–1	1–2
Bradford City	2–0	3–0		3–1	3–2	2–3	6–3	1–0	5–2	1–1	2–1	1–0	1–0	2–2	3–1	3–0	1–2	1–0	4–0	2–3
Burnley	2–2	2–1	0–1		6–0	4–0	1–1	0–0	3–0	1–0	1–1	2–0	4–2	1–2	5–0	5–1	2–1	3–0	0–1	3–0
Burslem Port Vale	2–2	3–0	2–3	4–4		0–0	2–0	2–2	3–2	1–0	4–1	3–2	2–1	1–2	1–2	4–2	4–2	5–0	2–1	0–0
Burton United	1–1	0–0	1–0	0–1	2–0		2–1	3–1	2–1	0–0	1–2	2–3	1–2	0–2	0–1	3–4	0–2	0–1	2–0	4–1
Chelsea	2–1	3–0	5–1	2–0	2–1	1–0		7–1	2–1	4–1	9–2	2–0	3–0	2–0	1–0	2–0	0–2	2–0	2–0	4–0
Chesterfield	3–2	0–1	3–4	0–1	4–2	2–0	0–0		2–1	7–0	1–3	1–3	3–1	1–0	2–1	1–0	1–1	0–2	2–2	3–2
Clapton Orient	1–0	0–0	1–1	2–1	1–1	1–0	0–1	1–2		3–1	3–0	1–0	2–1	1–1	1–0	1–1	0–1	1–1	1–1	4–0
Gainsborough Trinity	1–1	2–0	4–1	0–2	2–0	2–0	1–1	1–0	3–1		2–1	2–1	1–1	1–0	1–2	2–1	2–3	3–1	2–4	1–0
Glossop	2–1	0–0	1–2	1–0	4–0	2–2	0–1	3–1	3–0	3–1		1–0	2–4	2–0	2–2	2–1	0–2	2–3	0–0	2–1
Grimsby Town	1–0	0–0	0–2	1–0	2–0	1–1	2–1	3–1	1–2	2–0	2–1		1–3	4–0	0–1	4–0	3–1	3–1	2–1	2–1
Hull City	2–0	3–0	0–3	1–1	4–1	3–0	0–1	2–0	2–0	2–4	5–0	4–2		2–1	1–1	1–2	1–2	3–0	0–1	5–1
Leeds City	2–1	1–1	1–1	0–1	2–0	3–1	0–1	1–0	3–2	4–0	1–4	4–3	2–2		1–1	1–1	1–4	6–1	3–2	2–0
Leicester Fosse	2–1	5–1	1–0	2–0	4–1	3–0	1–1	2–0	2–1	3–1	2–2	2–0	3–0	2–2		3–0	1–2	1–0	3–0	2–0
Lincoln City	1–0	0–1	0–2	1–2	4–0	2–0	0–5	1–0	3–0	4–0	2–1	2–1	0–1	1–1	2–2		1–2	3–1	2–1	0–4
Nottingham Forest	0–0	3–0	3–0	2–0	2–2	2–0	3–1	3–1	4–0	3–1	2–0	0–3	2–1	3–0	2–1	3–1		2–1	3–1	1–0
Stockport County	0–0	0–0	2–1	2–1	3–0	2–0	1–2	1–1	1–1	1–2	5–0	3–0	1–1	2–2	1–0	1–0	0–0		0–1	0–0
West Bromwich Albion	3–1	3–0	3–0	3–2	3–0	5–1	1–2	5–2	5–0	5–0	5–1	6–1	3–0	5–0	0–1	2–1	3–1	1–1		1–1
Wolverhampton Wanderers	5–1	1–1	1–1	3–0	6–2	3–0	1–2	2–1	6–1	1–0	4–0	5–0	1–1	3–2	1–0	3–0	2–0	1–1	0–3	

Updated to match(es) played on unknown. Source: Ian Laschke: Rothmans Book of Football League Records 1888–89 to 1978–79. Macdonald and Jane’s, London & Sydney, 1980.
Legend: Blue = home team win; Yellow = draw; Red = away team win.

=== Maps ===
Locations of the Football League Second Division teams

== Attendances ==
=== Division One ===
No.	Club	Average
1	Newcastle United FC	33,235
2	Aston Villa FC	23,835
3	Manchester City FC	21,670
4	Manchester United	20,695
5	Everton FC	19,340
6	Liverpool FC	18,640
7	Middlesbrough FC	15,880
8	Woolwich Arsenal	15,800
9	Birmingham City FC	15,685
10	Sunderland AFC	15,450
11	Bolton Wanderers FC	14,960
12	Bristol City FC	14,920
13	Blackburn Rovers FC	12,265
14	Sheffield United FC	12,155
15	Bury FC	11,580
16	The Wednesday	11,555
17	Notts County FC	10,290
18	Preston North End FC	9,975
19	Derby County FC	6,980
20	Stoke City FC	5,605

== See also ==
- 1906–07 in English football
- 1906 in association football
- 1907 in association football
