= Herbert Bury =

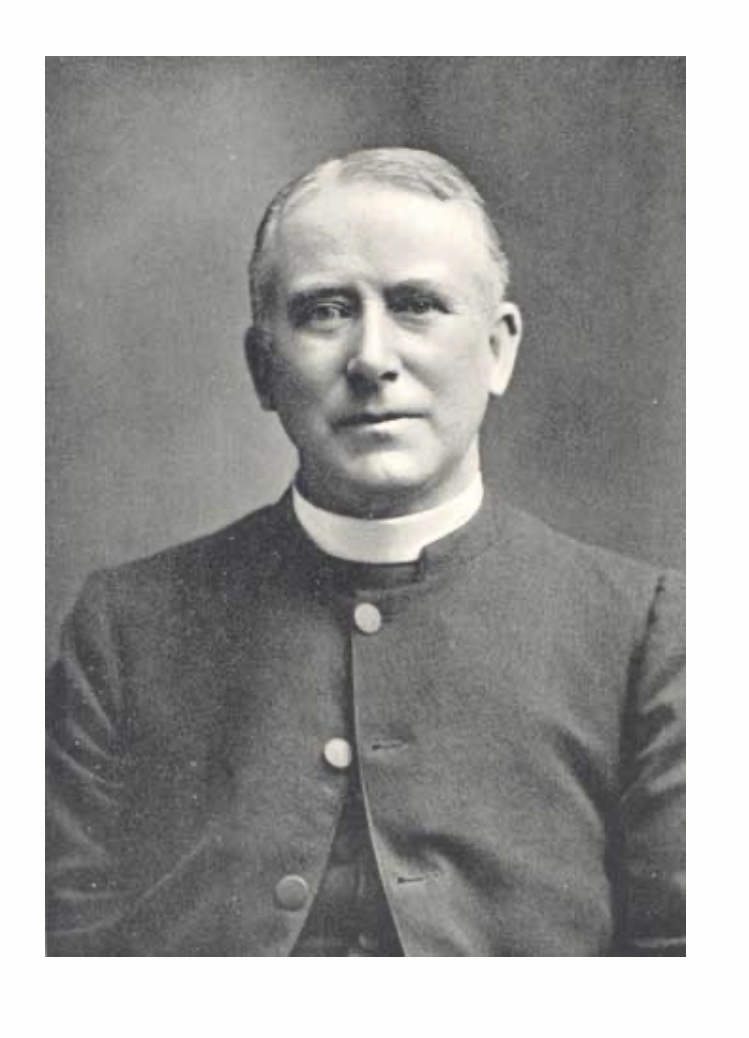
The Rt. Rev. Herbert Bury

Herbert Bury (19 June 1853 – 15 January 1933) was an Anglican bishop in the first decades of the 20th century.

He was appointed Bishop of British Honduras in 1908, remaining there until 1911, and was then Bishop for Northern and Central Europe until 1926.

== Life ==
Born in 1853, Bury was educated at Lincoln College, Oxford and ordained in 1878. After further incumbencies at Westminster St James, Newchurch in Rossendale and Hampstead he was appointed Bishop of Honduras in 1908, a post he held for three years. He was a coadjutor bishop to the Bishop of London — Bishop in Northern and Central Europe — from January 1911 until January 1926). For the sake of a stipend, he was appointed to a succession of near-sinecure City churches: Rector of St Katherine Coleman from June 1911, of St Peter, Vere Street from October 1916, Rector of St Anne and St Agnes from 31 March 1920 (which he retained until his death). Having resigned his European responsibilities, he remained an Assistant Bishop of London. An eminent author, he died on 15 January 1933.

== Selected publications ==
- A Bishop amongst Bananas (London: Wells Gardner, Darton, 1911)
