= Alwyne Wilks =

English footballer (1906–1980)

Personal information
- Full name: Alwyne Wilks
- Date of birth: 4 September 1906
- Place of birth: Staveley, West Riding of Yorkshire, England
- Date of death: 1980 (aged 73–74)
- Place of death: Doncaster, England
- Height: 5 ft 7 in (1.70 m)
- Position: Winger

Senior career*
Years	Team	Apps	(Gls)
1924–1925	Brodsworth Main Colliery		
1925–1927	Doncaster Rovers	14	(3)
1927–1929	Sunderland	52	(2)
1929	Reading	0	(0)
1929–1930	Barrow	6	(0)
1930–1931	Loughborough Corinthians		
1931–193?	Owston Park Rangers		
- * Club domestic league appearances and goals

Alwyne Wilks (4 September 1906 – 1980) was an English professional footballer who played as a winger for Sunderland.
