= Clifford Heap =

English footballer

Personal information
- Date of birth: 14 December 1906
- Place of birth: Burnley, England
- Date of death: 1984 (aged 77–78)
- Position: Full back

Senior career*
Years	Team	Apps	(Gls)
1928–1930	Burnley	5	(0)
1930–1931	Thames	13	(0)
1931	Clitheroe	?	(?)
1931–1932	Millwall	0	(0)
1932	Accrington Stanley	4	(0)
1933	Tunbridge Wells Rangers		
- * Club domestic league appearances and goals

Clifford Heap (14 December 1906 – 1984) was an English professional association footballer who played as a full back in the Football League for Burnley, Thames and Accrington Stanley.
