= Hogben toad =

Hogben toad can mean:

- A newsletter of Macquarie University Students Council, see Macquarie University Campus Experience#Hogben Toad
- Xenopus laevis, a toad used by Hogben for pregnancy testing, after which the newsletter was named
