= Fred Shinton =

English footballer

Personal information
- Full name: Frederick Shinton
- Date of birth: 7 February 1883
- Place of birth: Wednesbury, England
- Date of death: 11 April 1923 (aged 40)
- Place of death: Wednesbury, England
- Position: Centre forward

Senior career*
Years	Team	Apps	(Gls)
1905–1907	West Bromwich Albion	64	(46)
1907–1910	Leicester Fosse	78	(51)
1910–1911	Bolton Wanderers	7	(1)
1911	Leicester Fosse	14	(5)
1911–191?	Wednesbury Old Athletic		
Total		163	(103)
- * Club domestic league appearances and goals

Frederick Shinton (7 March 1883 – 11 April 1923) was an English footballer who played at centre forward or inside right. He scored 103 goals from 163 appearances in the Football League.

== Biography ==
Shinton was born in Wednesbury. He turned professional with West Bromwich Albion in April 1905 and remained with them until November 1907, when he joined Leicester Fosse for £150. In August 1910 he moved to Bolton Wanderers for a £1000 fee, but re-joined Leicester Fosse just five months later, for £750.

Shinton was not offered a contract by Fosse at the end of the 1910–11 season and instead joined Wednesbury Old Athletic, playing for the club in the Birmingham & District League. He featured in the club's Wednesbury Charity Cup winning side v Darlaston in March 1912, but although captaining the side at the start of the following season, he appears to have made no further appearances after October 1912.

He died at home in Wednesbury in April 1923 after a long illness.
