= George Augustus Chichester May =

Irish judge (18151892)

Right Hon. George Augustus Chichester May PC, QC (1815 – 16 August 1892) was an Irish judge.

== Early life ==
May was born in Belfast, the son of the Reverend Edward May and Elizabeth Sinclair. He was educated at Shrewsbury School and Magdalene College, Cambridge, where he graduated B.A. as 36th Wrangler and 3rd Classic in 1836, and became a fellow of Magdalene.

== Legal career ==
Called to the Irish Bar in 1844, he became Queen's Counsel in 1865. He unsuccessfully stood for election as a Conservative at Carrickfergus at the 1874 United Kingdom general election. He was appointed Law Adviser to the Lord Lieutenant of Ireland in 1874, and Attorney-General for Ireland in 1875. In 1877 he became Lord Chief Justice of the Queen's Bench for Ireland and on the passing of the Judicature Act became Chief Justice of the Queen's Bench Division of the Irish High Court. He retired in 1887 and died in 1892.

According to F. Elrington Ball's work on the pre-1921 Irish judiciary, while May was a considerable scholar, he was not well regarded as a barrister and his appointment was greeted with some protest.

== Family ==
May married Olivia Barrington, daughter of Sir Matthew Barrington, 2nd Baronet, still remembered for the foundation of Barrington's Hospital, and Charlotte Hartigan, daughter of the eminent surgeon William Hartigan, in 1853. She died in 1876. They had ten children, including George Chichester May, General Sir Edward Sinclair May, and Sir Francis Henry May, Governor of Hong Kong.

Legal offices
| Preceded by Henry Ormsby | Attorney-General for Ireland; 1875–1877 | Succeeded by Edward Gibson |
| Preceded by James Whiteside | Lord Chief Justice of the Queen's Bench for Ireland; 1877–1887 | Succeeded by Sir Michael Morris, Bt |
