= Frederic Murray (priest) =

Frederic Richardson Murray was the Archdeacon of Belize from 1907 to 1918.

Murray was educated at Hatfield College, Durham and ordained in 1869. After curacies at Grimley, Shepton Beauchamp, Ruyton XI Towns and Deal he went to Canada with the SPG. in 1888 he became Rector of St Mary, Belize.
