= Len Hargreaves =

English footballer

Personal information
- Full name: Leonard Hargreaves
- Date of birth: 7 March 1906
- Place of birth: Kimberworth, England
- Date of death: 1980 (aged 73–74)
- Place of death: Sheffield, England
- Position: Winger

Youth career
- Blackburn Wesleyans

Senior career*
Years	Team	Apps	(Gls)
1925–1927	Doncaster Rovers	44	(14)
1927–1929	Sunderland	35	(11)
1929	The Wednesday	2	(1)
1929–1932	Workington		
1932–1933	Doncaster Rovers		
1933–1934	Luton Town	0	(0)
1934–193?	Peterborough United		
- * Club domestic league appearances and goals

Leonard Hargreaves (7 March 1906 – 1980) was an English professional footballer who played as a winger for Sunderland.
