= Eldon Sylvester =

Anglican Bishop of Belize

Eldon Anthony Sylvester was the twelfth Anglican Bishop of Belize.

He was ordained in 1956. He was curate of St Mary, Belize from 1956 to 1967. After this he was Rector of Belize Rural and then St Luke, Orange Walk. He appointment as Lord Bishop of British Honduras was announced in October 1971, the title changing to Lord Bishop of Belize in 1973.
