= Fonseca e Castro =

Portuguese footballer

Personal information
- Full name: Manuel da Fonseca e Castro
- Date of birth: January 5, 1906
- Place of birth: Portugal
- Position: Forward

Senior career*
Years	Team	Apps	(Gls)
- Académico

International career
1925–1926	Portugal	3	(0)
- * Club domestic league appearances and goals

Manuel da Fonseca e Castro was a Portuguese footballer who played as a forward.
