= Harry Swaby =

English footballer

Personal information
- Full name: Henry Northing Swaby
- Date of birth: 22 January 1906
- Place of birth: Grimsby, England
- Date of death: 1982 (aged 75–76)
- Position: Defender

Senior career*
Years	Team	Apps	(Gls)
1924–1925	Grimsby YMCA		
1925–1926	Cleethorpes Town		
1926–1932	Grimsby Town	44	(2)
1932–1933	Barnsley	18	(0)
1933–1934	Scarborough		
1934–1935	Grantham		
1935–193?	Gainsborough Trinity		
- * Club domestic league appearances and goals

Henry Northing Swaby (22 January 1906 – 1982) was an English professional footballer who played as a defender.
