= St. Ann's Anglican Church =

Church in Belmopan, Belize

- Map showing St Ann's Anglican Church in Belize
- 17.250739°N 88.768946°W
- Location: Belmopan, Cayo District, Belize
- Denomination: Anglican
- Website: www.stannsbelmopan.com

St. Ann's Anglican Church is a church in Belmopan, Cayo District, Belize. It is located on Unity Boulevard.

During the COVID-19 pandemic, St. Ann's suspended in-person services.
