= Anglican Diocese of Belize =

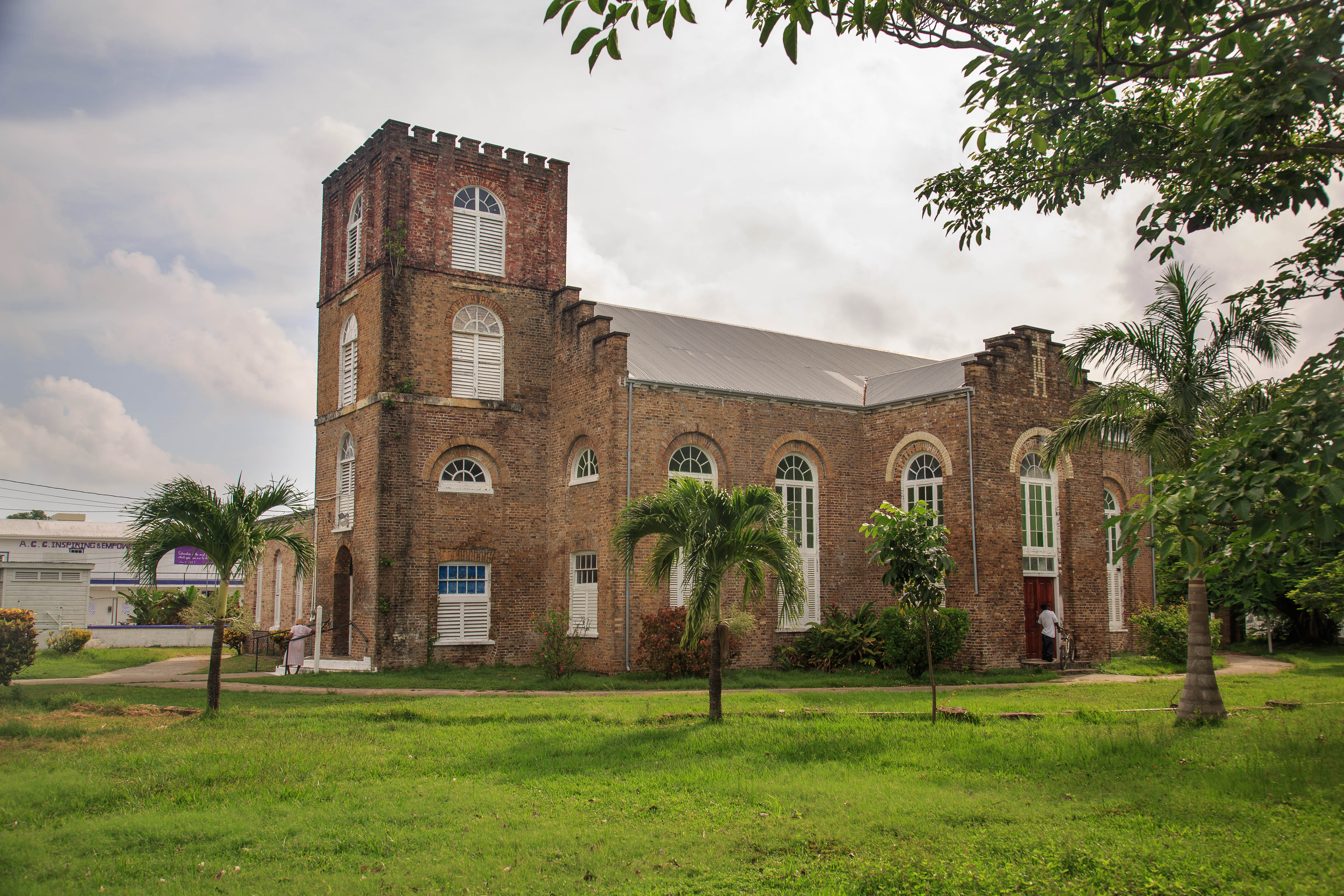
St John's Cathedral, Belize City

Arms of the Diocese of Belize

The Anglican Diocese of Belize was established in 1883. The current bishop is Philip Wright.

Established in 1883 as a member of the Church of the Province of the West Indies, the Diocese of Belize now comprises 31 churches spread throughout the country, and is engaged in missionary outreach on a national and international scale. In partnership with the government, it also operates 20 schools across the country of Belize.

== History of the diocese ==
In some sense, to understand the history of the Anglican Church in the midst of the history of Belize, one has to look back to the Indian tribes of the Moskito (or Mosquito) Shore in the mid-eighteenth century. After repeated appeals by Mr Peat, Rector of Jamestown, Jamaica, the Society for the Propagation of the Gospel in Foreign Parts (SPG) sent a succession of missionaries to work among the Indians. This started sometime after 1747 with Nathan Prince. Many of these missionaries did not fare well, succumbing to the harsh conditions and dying shortly after arrival in the region.

== Early chaplains to the Belize Settlement ==
The Moskito Coast Mission received Robert Shaw in 1774. However, in 1776, due to illness and inability to bear the climate there, Shaw was forced to return to England – being replaced by William Standord. On his way from the Mosquito Coast, Shaw made a stop in the Belize settlement (the ‘Bay Settlement’) which then consisted of British buccaneers living on St George's Caye, located a few miles offshore the mainland. Shaw stayed on to become the first chaplain of the Belize settlement.

Shaw's chaplaincy was interrupted by a Spanish invasion in 1779 from which Shaw escaped to the Moskito Shore. The public records make no mention of a permanent chaplain between the late 1780s and 1794, perhaps because of the unsettled times resulting from the territorial dispute between Mexico and England, including the Battle of St. George's Caye in September 1789, now celebrated on 10 September, annually. Ecclesiastical functions were carried out by the magistrates during this period.

In March 1794, William Stanford was appointed as chaplain. By this time the settlement had moved to the mainland, developing into what became known as Belize Town (today's Belize City). Despite early confrontations with the settlers and Superintendent, Stanford later became a Police Magistrate. This was a full-time administrative and judicial office in the local government and a most influential position. In 1803, by resolution of the magistrates, and through the efforts of Stanford, public funds were used to support the chaplaincy.

Between 1776 and 1810, the two chaplains (Shaw and Stanford) were more involved in the affairs concerning the government of the settlements than to that of the Church. They were more social stabilizers than evangelists. Yet partly due to their efforts and a growing sense of permanence among the settlers, the settlement was preparing to build a church building, call a rector and establish a school by 1810. on the twentieth of July, 1812, that the foundation stone of what was to become St John's Cathedral was laid by the then-Superintendent, Lt. Colonel John Nugent Smyth. By 1817 the magistrates were petitioning for assistance for the completion of the building. in 1818 the SPG approved $200 for the project.

== Beginnings of the Evangelical influence ==
Around this time John Armstrong arrived to replace Standford as the third chaplain of the settlement. His arrival was to produce remarkable changes in the relationship between the Church and the community at large. Armstrong was the product of the Wesleyan-initiated Evangelical Awakening that was taking place in England. Armstrong thus marked the start of the evangelical influence in Belize.

Two years later, in 1814, when the settlement received its new Superintendent in the person of Sir George Arthur, the evangelical influence intensified. Arthur was also an Evangelical Anglican with very strong Calvinist views. He and Armstrong embarked upon a program to reform the society much to the disgust of many of the settlers. He condemned their drunkenness, immorality, cruelty to the slaves and the injustice of their courts.

Armstrong and Arthur did not always agree on certain issues of government, however. Arthur's constant meddling in Armstrong's work often created tensions between them. Yet both men were driven by similar religious convictions. They did their best to advance the work of the Church in the settlement by erecting chapels and opening schools. Armstrong periodically expressed his desire to extend his ministry to the Indians near the settlement and at the Moskito Shore, but was never able to pursue this goal. During their time, on November 19, 1823, about 19,500 Garinagu Garifuna refugees arrived in Belize, a date commemorated since 1941 as Garifuna Settlement Day.

By 1825 the early evangelical influence had all but come to an end following the departure of Arthur and Armstrong, and thanks to the efforts of the majority of the settlers. Arthur was replaced by General Edward Codd, and Armstrong by Matthew Newport in 1824. Newport was ‘a high Churchman of the old eighteenth century type’ who believed in the historic orthodoxy of the Church. His determination to return to traditional Anglicanism characterized the approach to his chaplaincy. He was to make the settlement his home for the next thirty six years.

== Under the jurisdiction of the Diocese of Jamaica ==
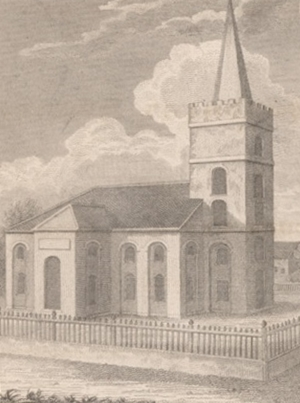
St. John's Church in 1825

On the thirteenth of April, 1826, St John's Church was consecrated by Christopher Lipscomb, Bishop of Jamaica. He had earlier, in July 1824, been consecrated and appointed to the Jamaican See with jurisdiction over the Church in the Belize settlement in accordance with the creation of the Diocese of Jamaica, with state-supplied stipends for two clergymen. His visit marked the first such visit of a bishop to the Belize settlement. About this time In 1830, Codrington College in Barbados started to prepare candidates exclusively to become priests, and in 1833 in England, the Anglo-Catholic Oxford Movement was beginning.

This relationship with the Diocese of Jamaica proved beneficial for the Church in the Bay Settlement. A grant from the SPG's Negro Instruction Fund was secured for the erection of a school at Belize Town as part of the effort to provide education for the slaves who were now legally free. SPG missionaries could now also be sent from Jamaica to Belize, such as Charles Mortlock in 1844–the first in over forty years.

The expansion of Belize Town to the north in the mid-1800s necessitated the construction of a second church building. A small wooden building was erected on the north side of the town dedicated to St Mary the Virgin. It was consecrated by the evangelical Aubrey Spencer, Bishop of Jamaica, in 1852. A few years later, the Anglo-Guatemalan Treaty of 1859 was signed, a basis for Guatemala's current and disputed claims about Belizean boundaries.

The Bishop of Jamaica in 1862 sought the support of the SPG in a scheme for the establishment of a mission in Northern British Honduras. By 1868 the bishop was able to send A. T. Giolme to Corozal.

== Disestablishment ==
On 2 August 1872, the Anglican Church in British Honduras was disestablished following that of Jamaica in 1870. Some have suggested that by this time the prominence of the Anglican Church was already on the wane due to internal differences within the Church concerning ‘High’ and ‘Low’ church forms of worship; the growing strength of the non-conformists (primarily Methodist and Baptist); and the arrival of the Roman Catholic Church within the influx of the Yucatán refugees from the Caste War of Yucatán. These developments changed the status of the Church in the settlement which then had to become more self-supporting.

The disestablishment of the churches in Jamaica and British Honduras also placed both churches under separate jurisdictions. When Reginal Courtenay, resigned as Bishop of Jamaica in 1879, his successor, William Tozer, was separately appointed as Bishop of Honduras, holding the title even after he had resigned the Jamaican See. Tozer's replacement, Enos Nuttall, had been a former Methodist missionary to Jamaica who became Bishop of Jamaica in 1880. He was requested by the Archbishop of Canterbury to reorganize the Church in British Honduras. Nuttall succeeded in getting the Colonial Office to make some amendments to the Disestablishment Law thereby securing the property of the Church, passed as the Church of England Act of 19 February 1883. During a visit to the colony in 1883, Nuttal was able to supervise the reorganization process. William Austin of Guyana became the first Primate of the Province of the West Indies in 1883. Nuttall later became Primate in 1893; his title of Primate was changed to Archbishop of the West Indies in 1897.

== Separate diocese ==
On 10 August 1883, through instrument by Edward Benson, Archbishop of Canterbury, the Church in Belize was duly constituted into a separate bishopric and diocese. Nuttall of Jamaica continued to exercise jurisdiction over the diocese until 1891.

== Extended diocese ==
Henry Holme was consecrated first bishop of British Honduras in St Michael's Cathedral, Barbados, on the first of March 1891. This was the first such consecration in the West Indies. Holme arrived in the colony on the fourth of April but died four months later in a shipwreck. He was succeeded by George Albert Ormsby whose appointment took place in 1893 with the SPG contributing to his stipend.

A year later, on 10 January 1894, Ormsby's jurisdiction was extended to include Guatemala, Spanish Honduras, Nicaragua and Costa Rica. By 1895 it was further extended to include Panama, Bolivia, Magdalena, Isthmus of Panama, and the City of Panama. Ormsby divided the colony of British Honduras itself into eight large mission districts and had eighteen clergy at work throughout his extended diocese. Grants from the SPG were a great support for these expansions.

Ormsby was succeeded in 1908 by Herbert Bury. At this time the diocese was reduced by transferring the Isthmus of Panama and all areas south of it to the jurisdiction of the Protestant Episcopal Church of the USA. Bishops to follow Bury included Walter Farrar in 1912, and Edward Dunn in 1917. Dunn remained bishop until 1943, and at the same time became Archbishop of the West Indies, 1936–1943.

By 1927, Dunn had ten clergy to serve six countries. Much work was maintained among the Moskito Indians who gave generously to the Church, longing to live under the rule of the British flag, as their ancestors had so done.

The shortage of priests remained, however. In 1930 the Diocese of Derby in England sought to assist by sending priests to work in the Diocese of British Honduras. Steven L. Caiger was among the first to go. He first served in British Honduras itself and later in Guatemala. He was followed by R. A. Pratt, who later became Archdeacon of Belize.

The 1931 hurricane that devastated the Colony of British Honduras caused tremendous damage to church property. The cathedral, St Mary's Church, and their respective rectories were seriously damaged. Again the SPG came to the rescue making a grant from the Marriot Bequest. Further depression set in when the United Fruit Company began to suffer serious losses in the 1930s. James Hughes, served as bishop from 1944 to 1945, and he was succeeded by Douglas Wilson, who served as bishop from 1945 to 1950. (Wilson had been assistant bishop since 1938.)

Between 1947 and 1957 the diocese was reduced by transferring Panama, El Salvador (Iglesia Episcopal Anglicana de El Salvador), Honduras (Diócesis de Honduras), and Guatemala (Iglesia Episcopal de Guatemala) to the jurisdiction of the Episcopal Church of the USA. The diocese was now back to its original geographical area of British Honduras. During this time Gerald Brooks, began serving as bishop 1950, and he remained bishop to 1966. During Brooks' tenure, Hurricane Hattie submerged Belize City in 1961, and Belize became self-governing. Brooks was succeeded by Benjamin Vaughan, who served as bishop from 1967 to 1971, and 1970 the capital of Belize was officially moved from Belize City to Belmopan, and subsequently, St Ann's Church was constructed in Belmopan. Eldon Sylvester began serving as Bishop of British Honduras in 1972.

== Wider context ==
In 1973, when the name "British Honduras" was changed to "Belize" and when Sylvester was serving as bishop, the diocese became known as the "Church of England in Belize", and Sylvester's title changed to "Bishop of Belize". With the passage of the Anglican Diocese of Belize Act in 2013, the name of the diocese became the "Anglican Church in the Diocese of Belize".

In 1975, the Diocese of Belize established a ‘companion relationship’ with the Diocese of New York of The Episcopal Church. In 1978, Sylvester ended his tenure as bishop was succeeded by K. A. McMillan, who served as bishop from 1980 to 1988 (being bishop on 21 September 1981 when Belize became an independent member of the British Commonwealth: Independence Day).

McMillan was succeeded by Brother D. Smith SSF, bishop from 1989 to 1992, and Smith was succeeded by Sylvester Romero, bishop from 1994 to 2004. The companion relationship with the Diocese of New York was to be followed with similar relationships with the Dioceses of North Carolina (1984-1993), Georgia (1990-1996), Los Angeles (1996), and the Diocese of Southern Virginia, also of The Episcopal Church.

Philip Wright became bishop in 2005. The Diocese entered into a companion relationship with the Diocese of St Albans of the Church of England in 2014. In terms of the Internet, in 2012 Wright introduced a) the first Diocese of Belize's Web page and b) the Diocese of Belize's, Anglican Theological Institute's online program (ATI) in conjunction with the Online Anglican Theological College program (OATC),. ATI's Director created an Anglican Daily Office Web site, primarily for student use, and was a key person who enabled the 2016 Spanish translation of the 1995 Book of Common Prayer for the Church in the Province of the West Indies (CPWI).

Belize is one of eight dioceses that constitute the CPWI which was formed in 1883. The Anglican Church in Belize is a member of both the Belize Council of Churches (BCC) and the Caribbean Council of Churches (CCC).
