= Sylvester Romero Palma =

Belizean bishop

Sylvester Romero Palma was the thirteenth Anglican Bishop of Belize from 1978. He resigned his See in 2005.
