= St. John's Cathedral (Belize City) =

St John's Anglican Church
- The Cathedral Church of St. John the Baptist
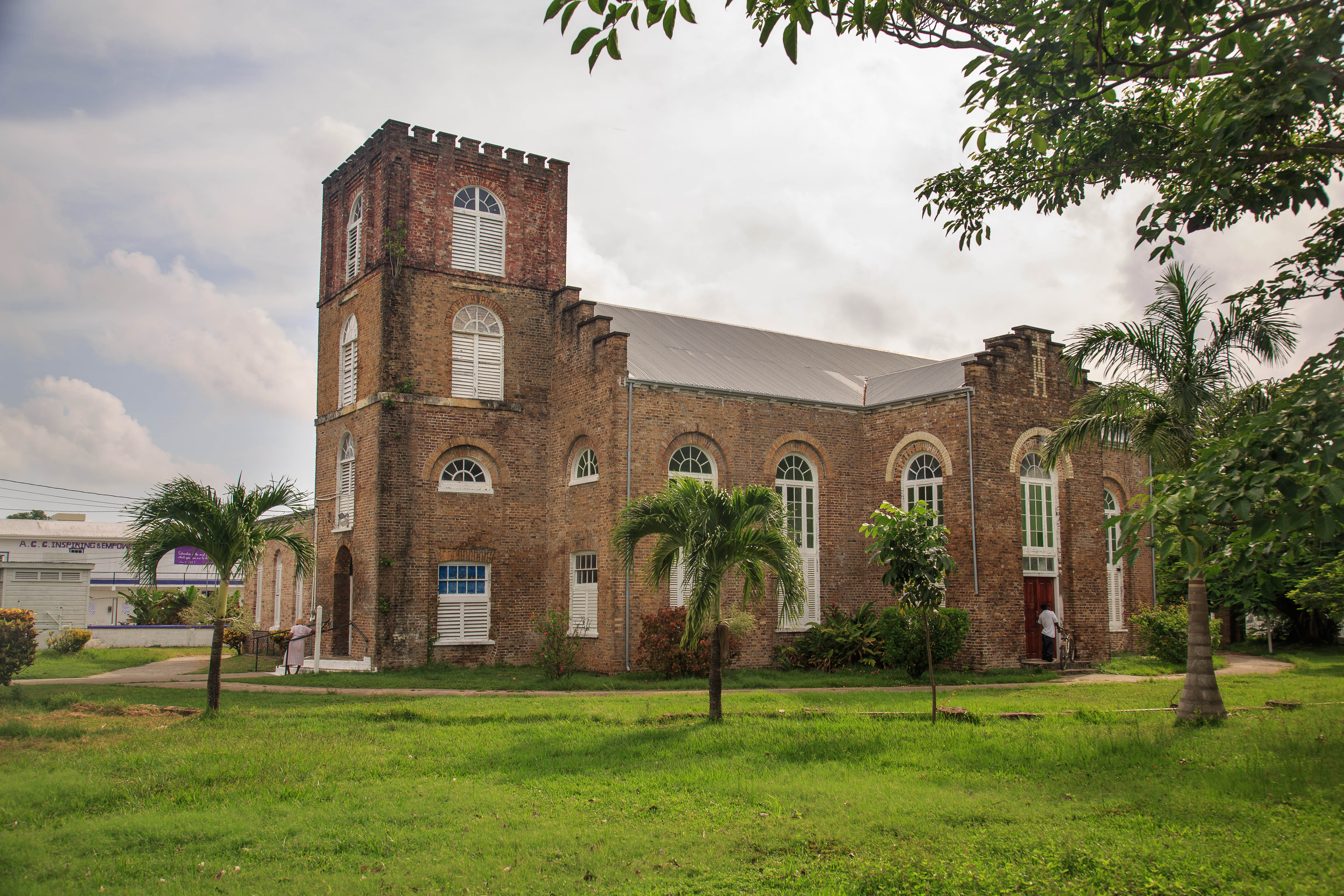
- St John's Anglican Church, viewed from the south-west
- St John's Anglican Church
- 17°29′19″N 88°11′16″W
- Address: Belize City
- Country: Belize
- Denomination: Anglican

History
- Status: Cathedral (since 1891); Church (1820 – 1891)
- Dedication: John the Baptist

Architecture
- Years built: 1812 – 1820

Administration
- Diocese: Belize

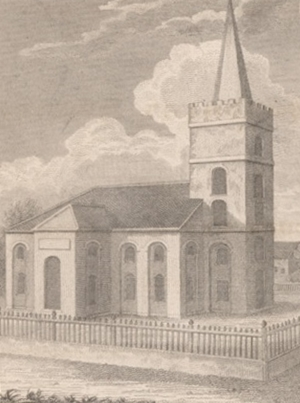
St. John's Church in 1825

The Cathedral Church of St. John the Baptist is an Anglican cathedral church, located in Belize City, Belize. It is the oldest Anglican Church in Central America. The cathedral is the seat or headquarters for the Bishop of Belize and the mother church of the Anglican Diocese of Belize.

== History ==
The church was built from 1812 to 1820 with bricks that had been used as ballast aboard ships, it was the first church to be built in the colony of British Honduras.

Initially a parish church, St. John's Church became St. John's Cathedral in 1891, a few years after the Diocese of Belize had been erected. It has numerous alterations dating to more recent renovations. The exterior of the church is of brick; the interior is fitted out in mahogany and sapodilla.

It is a historical landmark of Belize from the colonial influence of the country's past. Attached to the church is the oldest cemetery in the country, Yarborough Cemetery.

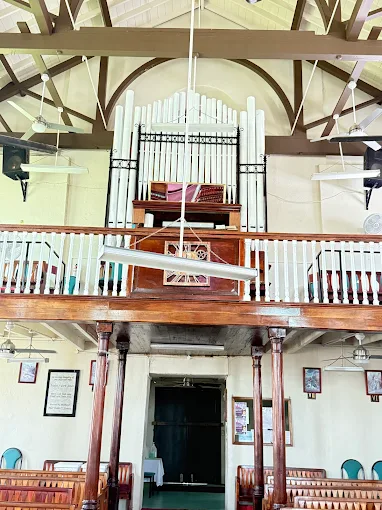
The pipe organ of the cathedral

The cathedral was the site of the Coronation of indigenous Miskito kings.

It was built by the British using slave labour.

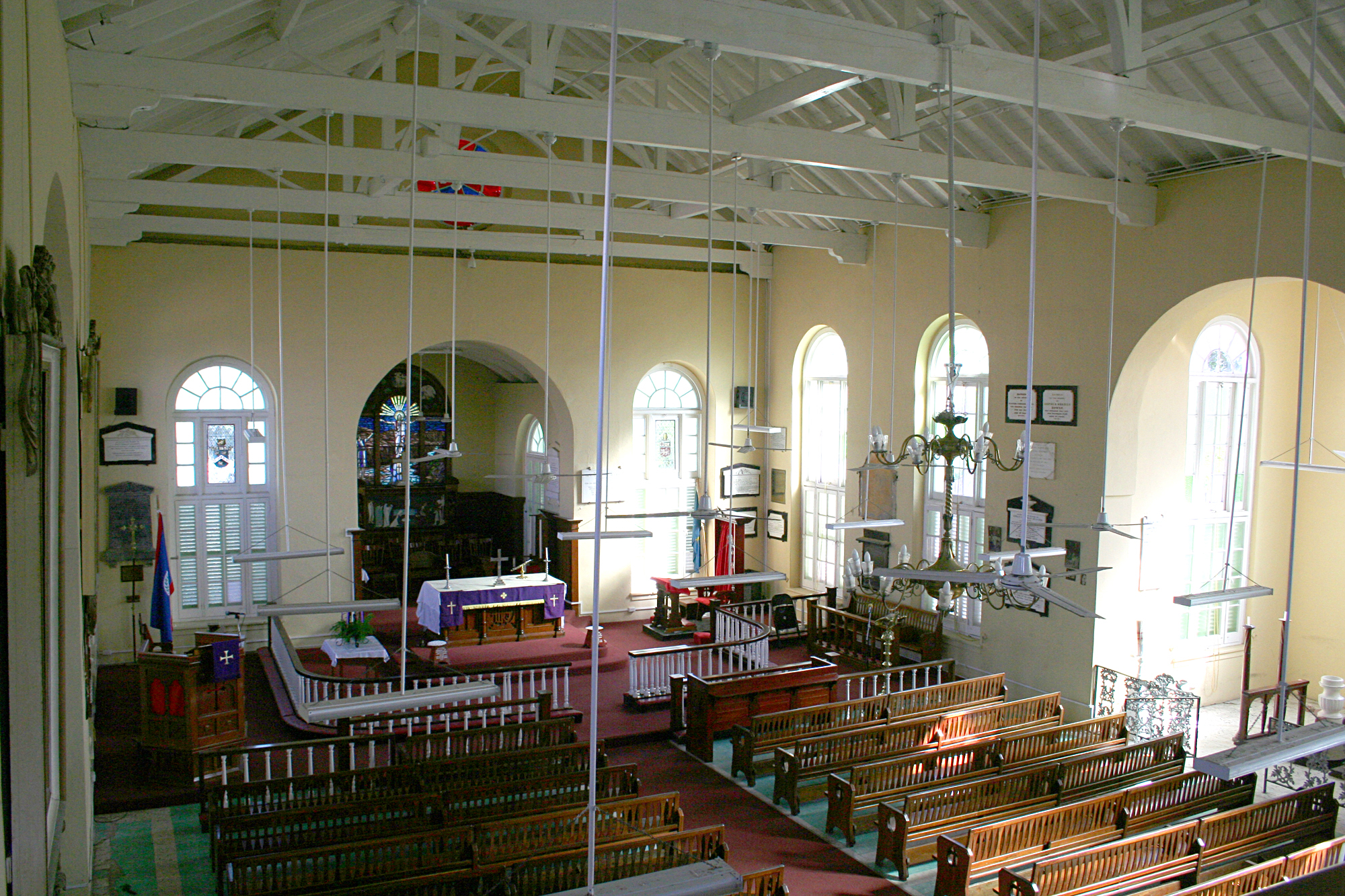
The interior of St John's Cathedral includes the high altar, sanctuary, a pipe organ and memorial plaques.
