= List of Jesuits =

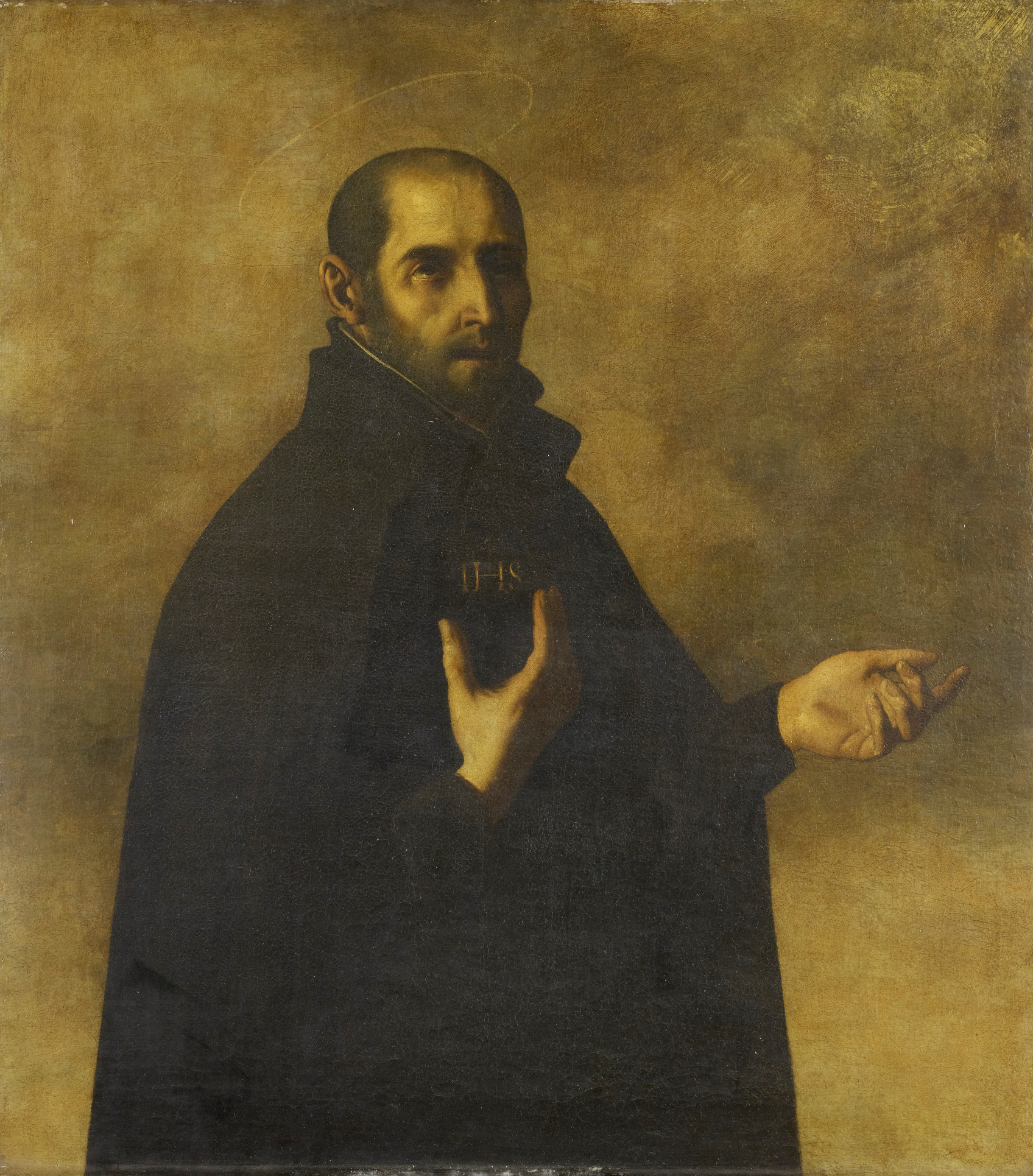
Ignatius of Loyola, recognized as a saint by the Catholic Church, founded the Society of Jesus in 1540.

This is an alphabetical list of historically notable members of the Society of Jesus.

== A ==
- Piotr Abramowicz (1619–1697), Polish missionary
- José de Acosta, Spanish historian; author of The Natural and Moral History of the Indies
- Rodolfo Acquaviva, Italian Jesuit missionary and priest in India
- François d'Aguilon, Belgian mathematician and physicist
- Mateo Aimerich, Spanish philologist
- Giacomo Maria Airoli, Italian Orientalist and scriptural commentator
- Edward Alacampe, English philosopher; Procurator of Rome
- Giulio Alenio, Italian missionary to China, called the "Confucius of the West"
- Claude-Jean Allouez, French Jesuit, missionary to Wisconsin
- Diego Francisco Altamirano, Spanish author
- Charles Aylmer, Irish Jesuit, superior of the Dublin Residence
- Jean Joseph Marie Amiot, French missionary to China
- José de Anchieta, Spanish missionary in Brazil, founder of São Paulo, Brazil
- Saint Modeste Andlauer, martyred in China
- Antal Andrassy, second Bishop of the Roman Catholic Diocese of Rozsnyó
- Yves Marie André, French mathematician, philosopher, and essayist
- Juan Andrés, prolific 18th-century Spanish writer
- Renatus Andrieux, victim of the September massacres
- Francesco degli Angeli, missionary to Ethiopia
- Johannes Arnoldi, German missionary, martyred in Germany
- Saint Edmund Arrowsmith, one of the Forty Martyrs of England and Wales
- Stefano Arteaga, Spanish writer
- Fr. Pedro Arrupe, 28th Superior General of the Society of Jesus who led the first rescue party in Hiroshima after the dropping of the atomic bomb.
- Xabier Arzalluz, Spanish Basque leader; later left the Society
- Berndt David Assarsson (1892–1955), Swedish monsignor, historical author and psalmist
- Joanna of Austria, Princess of Portugal, reputed to have taken the order's vows under the name Mateo Sánchez
- Hyacinthe Robillard d'Avrigny (1675–1719), historian
- Christopher Agliano (Unknown - Present), theology teacher
- Miguel de Ayatumo, venerated Filipino seminarian dubbed as "Saint Aloysius Gonzaga of the Philippines"

== B ==
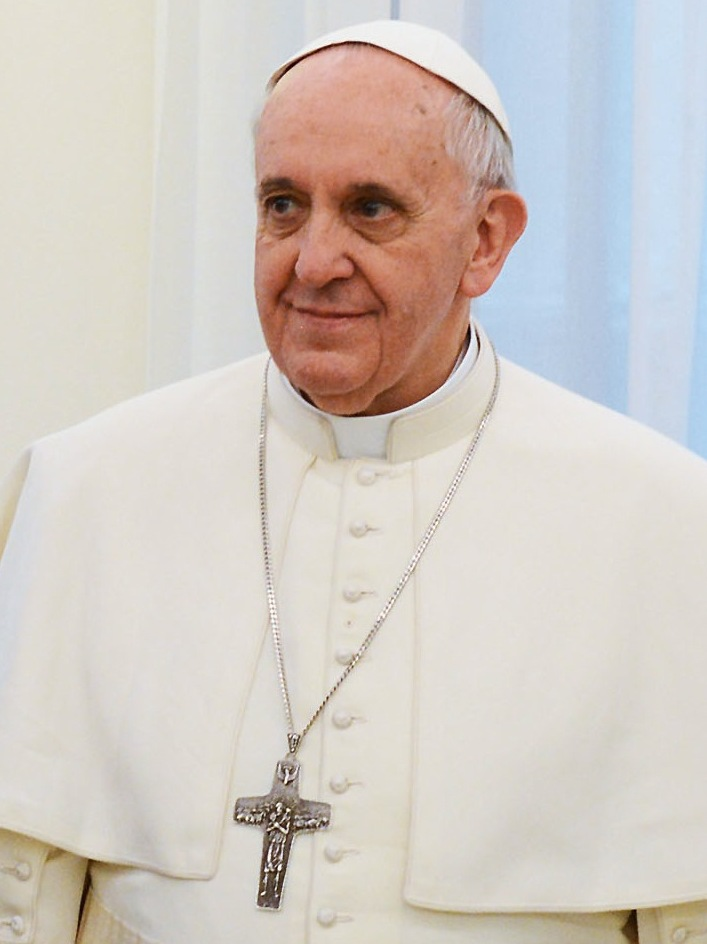
Pope Francis

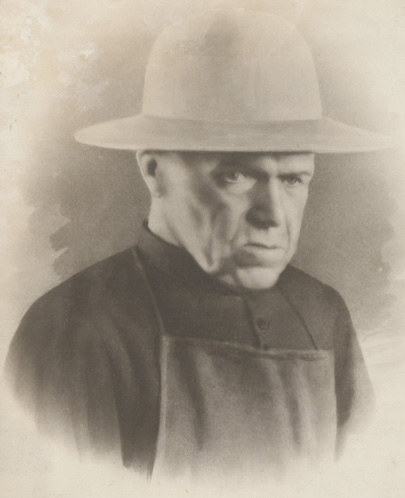
Blessed Jan Beyzym, Missionary in Madagascar

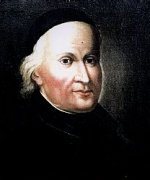
Tadeusz Brzozowski (1749–1820) first post-restoration General

- Jakob Balde, German Latinist, court chaplain to Maximillian I
- John Ballard, English Jesuit priest executed for being involved in an attempt to assassinate Queen Elizabeth I of England
- Hans Urs von Balthasar, 20th-century theologian, Jesuit from 1928 to 1950 when he left the order to found a new community with Adrienne von Speyr
- Baldassare Diego Loyola, Moroccan prince who converted to Christianity and became a Jesuit priest
- Cipriano Barace, Spanish missionary and martyr
- Ignacio Martín-Baró, martyr in El Salvador
- Pedro Barreto, Peruvian cardinal proclaimed by Pope Francis in 2018.
- Augustin Barruel, French writer
- Florian Baucke, Silesian and Bohemian Jesuit missionary to South America
- Michel Baudouin, Superior-General of the Louisiana Mission (1749–1763)
- Joseph Bayma, wrote "Molecular Mechanics" in 1866
- Augustin Bea, German cardinal, Ecumenist at the Vatican II council
- Nicolas-Ignace de Beaubois, French missionary to Quebec
- Jan Beckx, Belgian Superior General (1853–1887)
- Franz Jozef van Beeck, Dutch theologian who taught in the US
- Joop Beek, Dutch and Indonesian educator and presidential political advisor
- Johann Adam Schall von Bell, German missionary to China; astronomer
- Saint Robert Bellarmine, Italian Cardinal and theologian, Doctor of the Church
- Aloysius Bellecius (1704–1757), Jesuit ascetic author
- Saint John Berchmans, Jesuit seminarian from Belgium
- Jorge Mario Bergoglio (Pope Francis), Argentine, first Jesuit to be elected Pope (2013)
- Thomas V. Bermingham, American academic who worked on The Exorcist
- Prosper Bernard, Canadian missionary to China, killed by the Japanese
- Joaquin G. Bernas, Filipino constitutionalist
- Daniel Berrigan, American political activist, poet, and professor at Fordham University
- Saint Jacques Berthieu, French Jesuit priest, missionary and first blessed Martyr of Madagascar
- Blessed Jan Beyzym, Polish missionary to people with Leprosy in Madagascar
- Giuseppe Biancani, very early selenographer
- Jacob Bidermann, theologian and playwright - inspired Johann Wolfgang Goethe
- Jacques de Billy, correspondent of Pierre de Fermat, many early contributions in number theory
- Erwin Bischofberger, Swedish Jesuit and medical practitioner
- Leopold Biwald, 18th-century Austrian physics professor and textbook author
- Jose Luis Blanco Vega, Spanish professor and film critic
- Saint Andrew Bobola, Polish missionary, martyred by the Cossacks
- Nicholas Bock, Russian diplomat who later became a Jesuit priest
- Michael Bordt, German philosopher and academic
- Saint Francis Borgia, third Superior General of the Society
- Ruggero Boscovich, Croatian scientist who made many contributions to physics and astronomy
- Giovanni Botero, Italian thinker, discharged from the Society in 1579
- Joachim Bouvet, early missionary to China and a leading member of the Figurist movement
- Louis Bourdaloue, French preacher and orator
- William S. Bowdern, exorcist who inspired the novel and film The Exorcist
- Greg Boyle, director and founder of Homeboy Industries
- Joseph A. Bracken, American philosopher and Catholic theologian
- Dean Brackley, Professor of Theology at the Central American University, San Salvador
- Niklaus Brantschen, Swiss Zen master, author, and founder of the Lassalle-Institut
- Saint Jean de Brébeuf, 17th-century French-Canadian missionary and martyr
- Saint Alexander Briant, English martyr
- Frank Brennan, Officer of the Order of Australia for services to Aboriginal Australians
- John Brignon, translator of religious works into French
- Peter Michael Brillmacher, German preacher during the Counter Reformation
- Jean de Brisacier, controversialist and opponent of Jansenism
- Saint John de Brito, Portuguese martyr and missionary to Madura, India (present-day Tamil Nadu)
- Stephen Brown (Jesuit), founder of the Central Catholic Library
- Tadeusz Brzozowski, Polish scholar, having secured its continuity during the suppression of the Society until its restoration, elected twentieth Superior General of the Society of Jesus and its first world-wide general.
- Claude Buffier, aimed to discover the ultimate principal of knowledge, praised by Voltaire
- Joannes Busaeus, theologian at Mainz University who wrote in defence of the introduction of the Gregorian calendar in Germany
- William J. Byron, President of the University of Scranton (1975–1982), President of Catholic University of America (1982–1992), Interim President of Loyola University New Orleans (2003–2004), President of St. Joseph's Preparatory School (2006–2008)

== C ==
- Niccolò Cabeo, many early contributions to physics
- Pedro de Calatayud, missionary
- Saint Edmund Campion, English martyr
- Saint Petrus Canisius, Dutch theologian, writer of the widely used Little Catechism; Doctor of the Church
- James Carney, American missionary who ministered to peasants and left-wing insurgents in Honduras
- John Carroll, first bishop of the United States and founder of Georgetown University
- Paolo Casati, Mathematician, supported Galileo
- John II Casimir Vasa, king of the Polish–Lithuanian Commonwealth
- Louis Bertrand Castel, French scientist
- Leonardo Castellani, 20th-century Argentine writer and theologian
- Giuseppe Castiglione, Italian Jesuit brother; artist to the Chinese Emperor
- Saint Juan del Castillo, martyr of the Río de la Plata
- Juan Paez de Castro, priest and confessor to King Philip II of Spain
- Jean Pierre de Caussade, spiritual director, college rector, and author of Abandonment to Divine Providence
- Jean-Antoine du Cerceau, French Jesuit priest, poet, and playwright
- Michel de Certeau, French cultural theorist
- Francesco Cetti, mathematician and zoologist
- Saint Noël Chabanel, North American martyr
- Timoléon Cheminais de Montaigu, 17th century orator
- Pierre Cholenec, Superior of Montreal
- Stephen Cardinal Chow Sau-yan, 9th Bishop of Hong Kong, Former Provincial superior of the Chinese Province
- Drew Christiansen, nuclear expert and disarmament consultant to the Holy See
- Walter Ciszek, missionary and religious prisoner in Soviet Union; author
- Saint Peter Claver, Spanish missionary in South America
- Christopher Clavius, main architect of the modern Gregorian calendar
- Saint Claude de la Colombière, preacher to the seventh Duchess of York, Mary of Modena
- Louis le Comte, early missionary to China
- Guy Consolmagno, Vatican astronomer
- Frederick Copleston, English writer, author of the definitive History of Philosophy
- Honoré-Gaspard de Coriolis, French cleric and historian
- John M. Corridan, labor activist and "Waterfront priest" whose story inspired the classic film On the Waterfront
- Horacio de la Costa, Philippine historian and first Filipino Jesuit provincial superior in the Philippines
- Jacques Courtois, 17th-century French painter
- François Crépieul, 17th-century French missionary in Canada
- Saint Roque González de Santa Cruz, Paraguayan missionary and martyr
- James Cullen, Irish temperance campaigner who founded the Pioneer Total Abstinence Association
- Johann Baptist Cysat, published the first printed European book concerning Japan
- Stanislaus Czerniewicz, Lithuanian-Polish priest, elected vicar general for Jesuits in Russia when the Society of Jesus was suppressed
- Stanisław Czerski, Polish graphic designer

== D ==
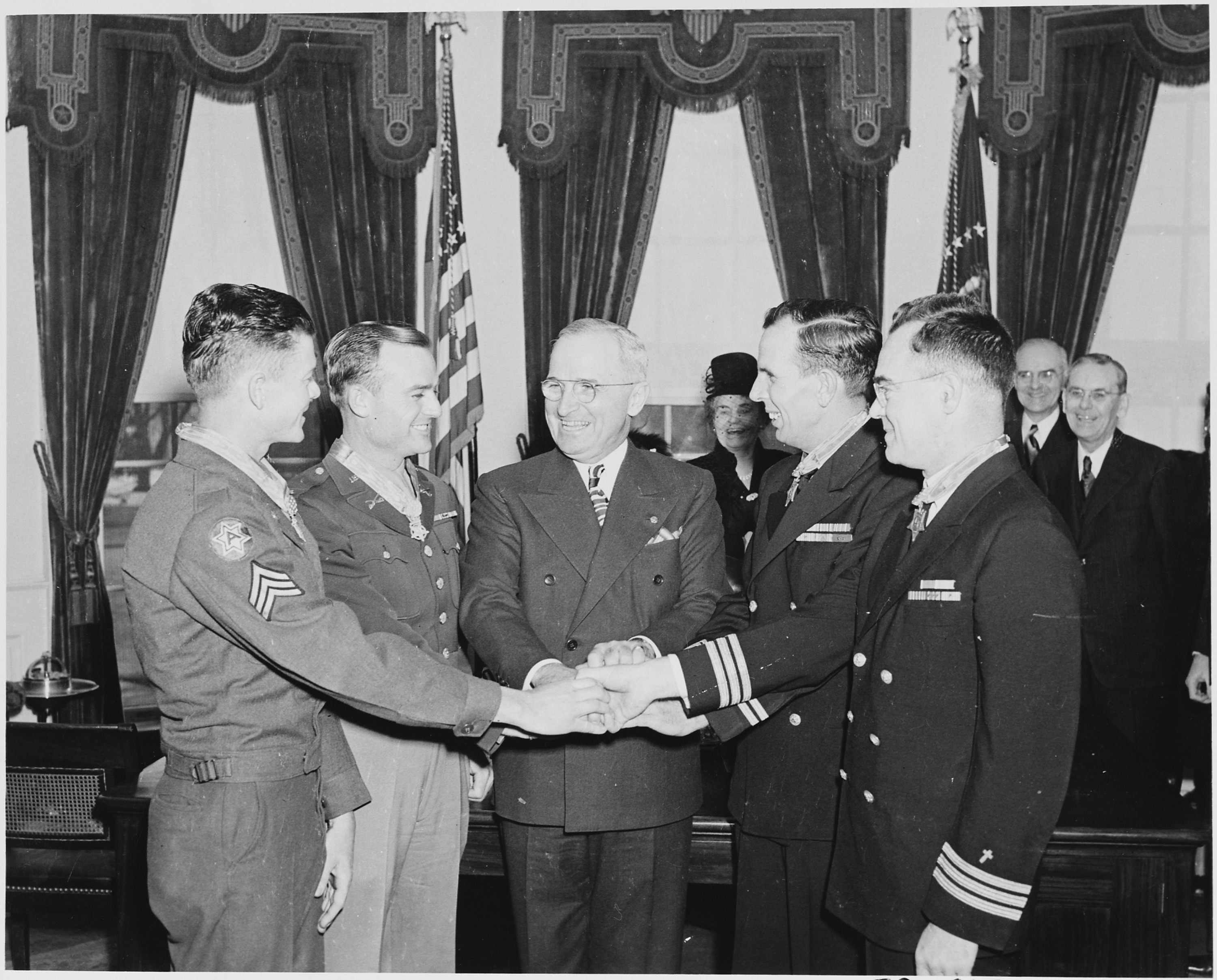
Fr. Joseph O'Callahan (right), a Jesuit priest, is presented with the Medal of Honor by President Truman

- Claude Dablon, Superior General of all the Canadian missions (1670–1680)
- Saint Antoine Daniel, North American martyr
- Cardinal Jean Daniélou, author, scholar, and member of the French Academy
- Alfred Delp, German hanged for his opposition to Hitler
- Saint Paul Denn, martyred in China
- Robert De Nobili, Italian missionary to India (Madurai Mission), who tried to inculturate Christian values to the Indian culture
- Henri Depelchin, Belgian missionary, pioneer, writer and educator in India and Africa
- Pedro Descoqs, French Jesuit philosopher and supporter of Action Française
- Ippolito Desideri, Italian Jesuit missionary to Tibet
- Paul de Barry, rector of the Jesuit colleges at Aix, Nîmes, and Avignon, and Provincial of Lyon.
- Pierre-Jean De Smet, active missionary among the Native Americans of the Western United States in the mid-19th century
- Richard De Smet, Jesuit Indologist (Sankara specialist), Professor of Phisosophy, JnanaDeep Vidyapeeth, Pune, Maharashtra, India; prolific writer and contributor to the Marathi Encyclopaedia of Philosophy
- William Detré, 17th century missionary in the Amazon
- Salvatore di Pietro, Italian missionary and first apostolic prefect to Belize, Central America
- Pedro Díaz, missionary
- John Donne, English poet and cleric in the Church of England (no evidence)
- Eduardo Dougherty, American-Brazilian educator, communicator and leader of the Catholic Charismatic Renewal in Brazil
- Robert Drinan, first Catholic priest to serve as a voting member of U.S. Congress (congressman from Massachusetts) (Note: Father Gabriel Richard was briefly in the U.S. Congress in the 1820s, but as a territorial representative. Under guidelines released by Pope John Paul II, Catholic clergy are expected not to serve in positions of civil authority. Drinan did not seek re-election as a result of the issuance of these guidelines.)
- Gabriel Druillettes, Apostle of Maine, missionary and explorer
- Francis Bennon Ducrue, Bavarian missionary to Mexico
- Peter Dufka, Slovak priest and professor at the Pontifical Oriental Institute in Rome
- Cardinal Avery Dulles, American theologian and professor at Fordham University
- Jacques Dupuis, theologian, edited The Christian Faith which went to seven editions

== E ==
- Ignacio Ellacuría, rector of University of Central America; murdered in 1989
- Saint Philip Evans, one of the Forty Martyrs of England and Wales

== F ==
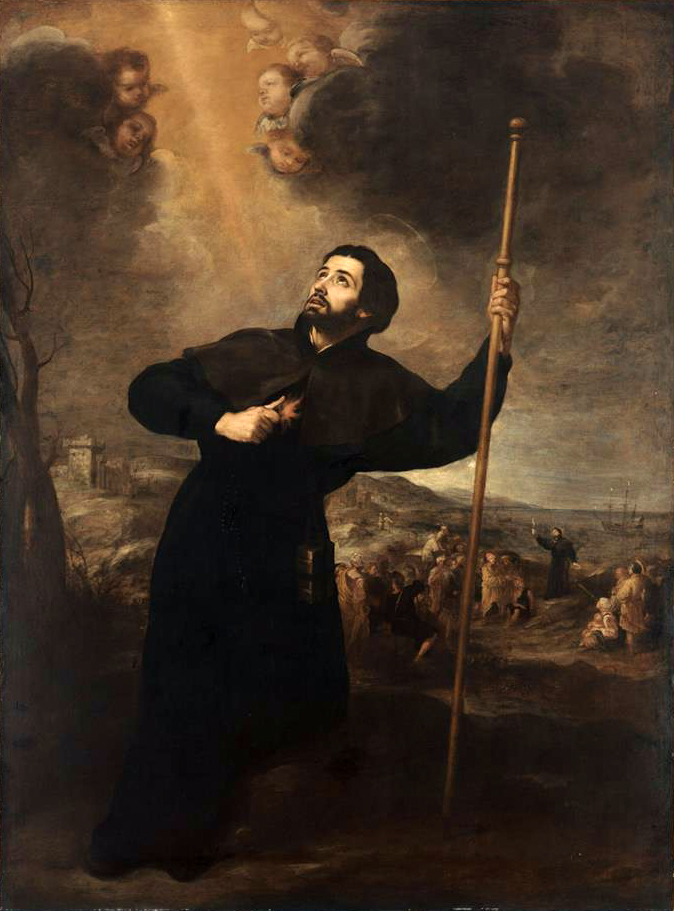
Francis Xavier, one of the first seven Jesuits and missionary to Asia

- Saint Peter Faber, early companion of Ignatius of Loyola, co-founder of the Society of Jesus; missionary in Germany
- Honoré Fabri, first to explain why the sky is blue
- Jean-Charles della Faille, first to determine the center of gravity of the sector of a circle
- Thomas Falkner, English Jesuit missionary
- Leonard Feeney, ultra-conservative American theologian
- Wolfgang Feneberg, German Jesuit convert to Evangelical Lutheranism
- Richard Michael Fernando, Filipino Jesuit cleric, missionary in Cambodia and Servant of God
- Joseph Fessio, publisher of Ignatius Press
- Joseph M. Finotti, pastor of Saint Mary's parish in Alexandria, Virginia; pastor of Saint Ignatius parish in Oxon Hill, Maryland; librarian at Georgetown University in Washington, D.C.
- Pierre-René Floquet, Quebec-based priest sympathetic to the Americans during the American Revolutionary War
- Jean de Fontaney, missionary to China
- Balthazar Francolini, attritionist professor at the Gregorian University who wrote Clericus Romanus Contra Nimium Rigorismum Munitus in 1707 against Jansenism
- Saint Francis Xavier, co-founder of the Society of Jesus and missionary to Asia who initiated a large conversion movement in India, Malacca, and Japan
- Luís Fróis, Portuguese missionary to Japan; author of a history of Japan
- Fabian Fucan, Japanese Jesuit brother who converted to Zen Buddhism
- Jon Fuller, medical doctor known for his work with AIDS patients

== G ==
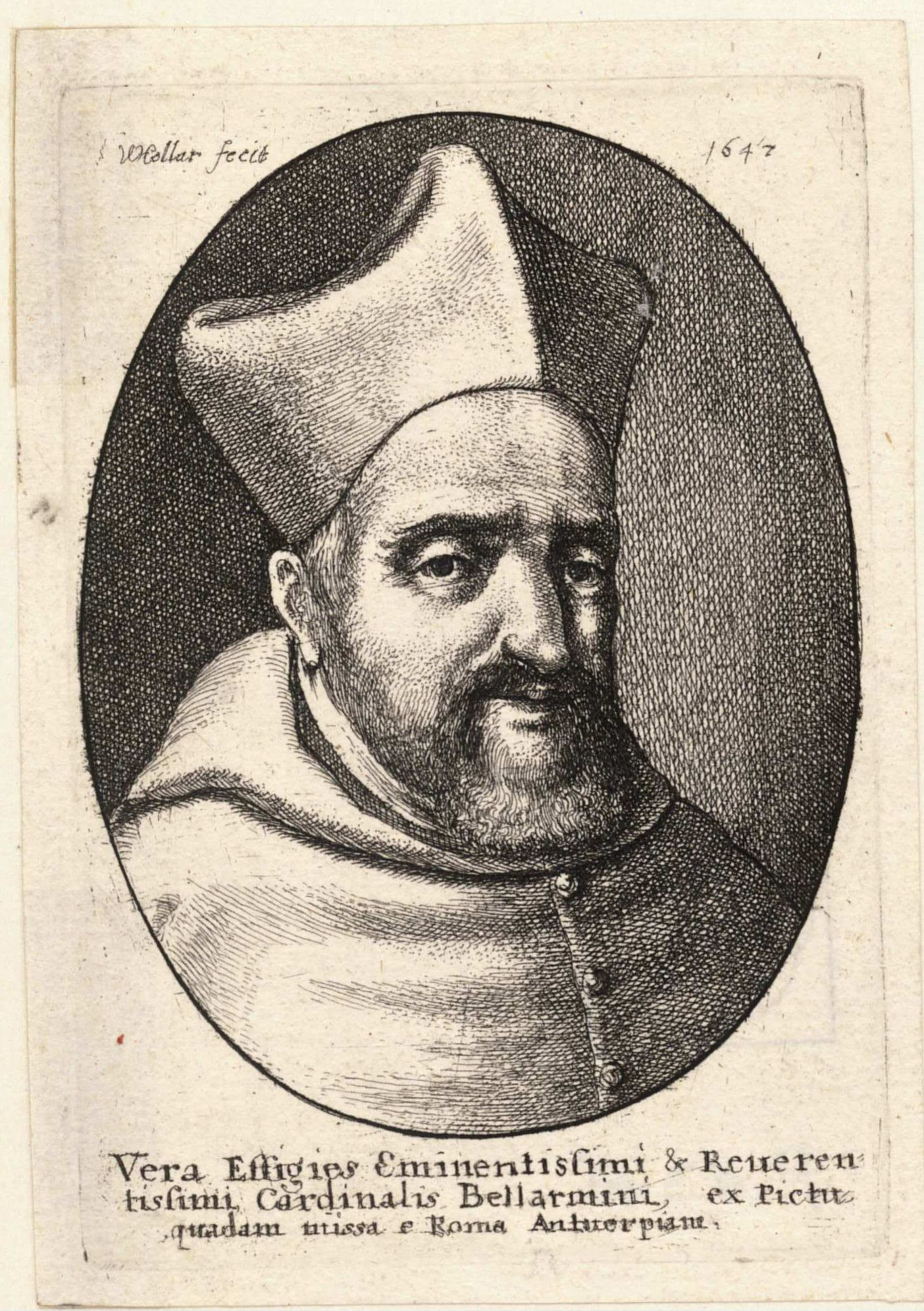
Robert Bellarmine, one of the most important cardinals of the Catholic Reformation

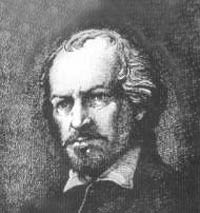
Saint Melchior Grodziecki, martyr

- Père Louis Gaillard, French missionary to China
- Marion M. Ganey, pioneer in credit union and coop movement in British Honduras and the South Pacific
- Saint Henry Garnet, first English Provincial; executed after being implicated in the Gunpowder Plot
- Saint Charles Garnier, North America martyr
- John Gerard, English Jesuit; one of the few men to escape from the Tower of London
- Jean-François Gerbillon, early missionary to China
- Aquiles Gerste, philologist and linguist best known for his ethnographic and linguistic studies of the indigenous peoples of Mexico
- Niccolò Gianpriamo, Italian missionary to China, astronomer
- Filippo Salvatore Gilii, contributor in the field of South American historical linguistics
- Saavan Goel, head graphologist of OA, Karnataka, India
- Paul Goethals, Belgian, first Archbishop of Calcutta
- Saint Aloysius Gonzaga, Italian jesuit; patron saint of students
- Thyrsus González, Spanish 13th Superior General of the Society of Jesus
- José Ignacio González Faus, Professor of Theology at the Faculty of Theology of Catalonia
- John Goodman, jailed in England during the Long Parliament
- Saint John Soan de Goto, martyred in Japan
- Saint René Goupil, Jesuit brother and North American martyr
- Baltasar Gracián, Spanish prose writer
- Cardinal Aloys Grillmeier, German theoligian
- Francesco Maria Grimaldi, 17th-century Italian mathematician, physicist and astronomer; accurately mapped the Moon; one of the first to suggest the wave-like nature of light
- Saint Melchior Grodziecki, Polish martyr, patron of the city of Katowice
- Gabriel Gruber, Viennese scientist, engineer and teacher, elected Vicar General of the Russian province during the Suppression of the Society
- Paul Guldin, father of Guldinus theorem
- José Gumilla, naturalist who studied the Orinoco, South America
- Bartolomeu de Gusmão, Brazilian-Portuguese priest and mathematician; said to be an early inventor of the dirigible

== H ==
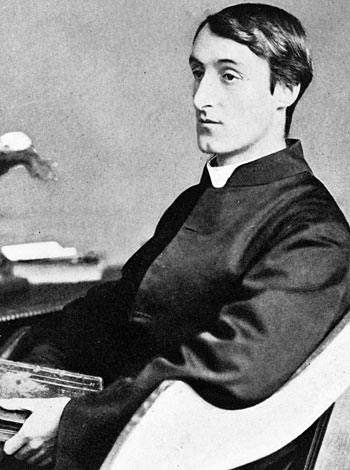
Gerard Manley Hopkins, an English poet, Roman Catholic convert, and priest

- Juraj Habdelić, Croatian writer and lexicographer
- Cyrus Habib, American politician turned Jesuit
- Walter Halloran, assistant in the exorcism which inspired the novel and film The Exorcist
- John Hardon, wrote The Catholic Catechism and many other works
- Peter Hasslacher, German preacher
- Irénée Hausherr, Alsatian specialist in Greek patristic and monastic spirituality
- Bernhard Havestadt, German missionary in Chile
- Timothy Healy, late president of Georgetown University and president of the New York Public Library system
- Martin Heidegger, German philosopher who was briefly a Jesuit novice
- Raymond Helmick, American theologian and author
- Daniel S. Hendrickson, 25th president of Creighton University
- David Francis Hickey, American missionary bishop of Belize, Central America
- Robert Louis Hodapp, American missionary bishop of Belize, Central America
- John-Baptist Hoffmann, German Apostle of the Mundas in India
- Ferdinand Augustin Hallerstein, missionary to China that was made a mandarin
- Christopher Holywood, Irish priest of the Counter-Reformation
- Eduardo Hontiveros, Filipino philosopher, theologian and composer of sacred and liturgical music
- Frederick C. Hopkins, English missionary to Belize Central America; bishop and vicar apostolic
- Gerard Manley Hopkins, renowned English poet
- Johann Baptiste Horvath, 18th-century Hungarian/Slovak physics professor and textbook author
- Vincent Houdry, preacher and writer
- Gerard W. Hughes, Scottish Jesuit priest and spiritual writer
- Franz Hunolt, German priest and author
- Saint Alberto Hurtado, social reformer in Chile

== I ==
- Saint Ignatius of Loyola, co-founder and first Superior General of the Society of Jesus
- Blessed John Ingram
- Saint Rémy Isoré, martyred in China
- Angelo Italia, 17th century Sicilian architect

== J ==
- Andreas Jaszlinszky, 18th-century Hungarian physics professor and textbook author
- Saint Francis de Geronimo, Italian priest and missionary
- Franz Jetzinger, theology professor, Austrian political figure, and principal biographer of Adolf Hitler's early years
- Pierre Johanns, Luxemburger priest and missionary in India
- Saint Isaac Jogues, 17th-century French martyr and missionary to North America
- Miguel Agustín Pro Juárez, Mexican priest, executed during the persecution of the Catholic Church under the presidency of Plutarco Elías Calles
- Claude Judde, 18th century French teacher
- Paul Joüon, 19th century French hebraist.

== K ==
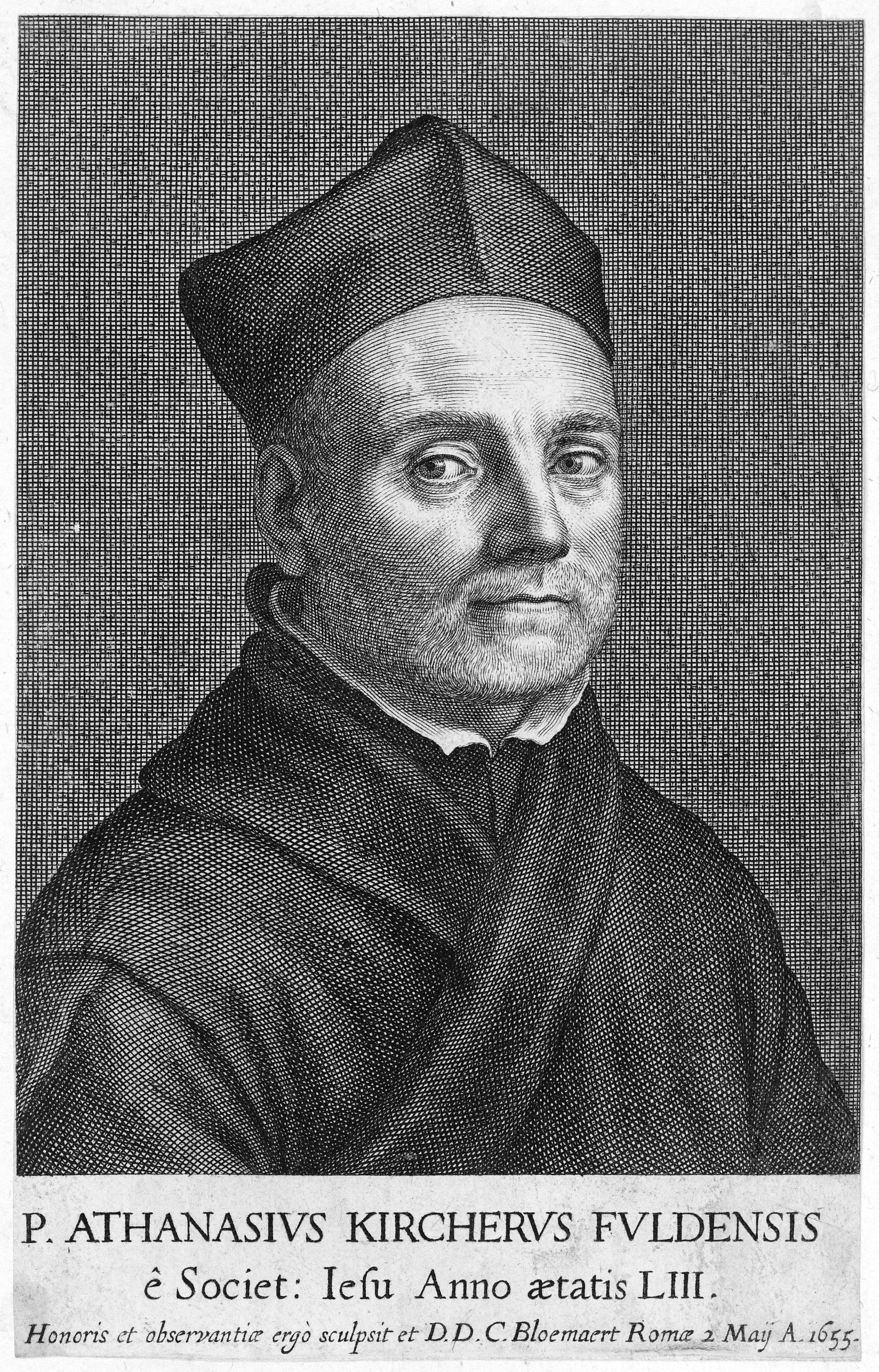
Athanasius Kircher, a 17th c. polymath

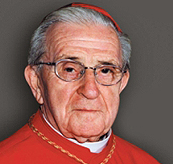
Cardinal Adam Kozlowiecki

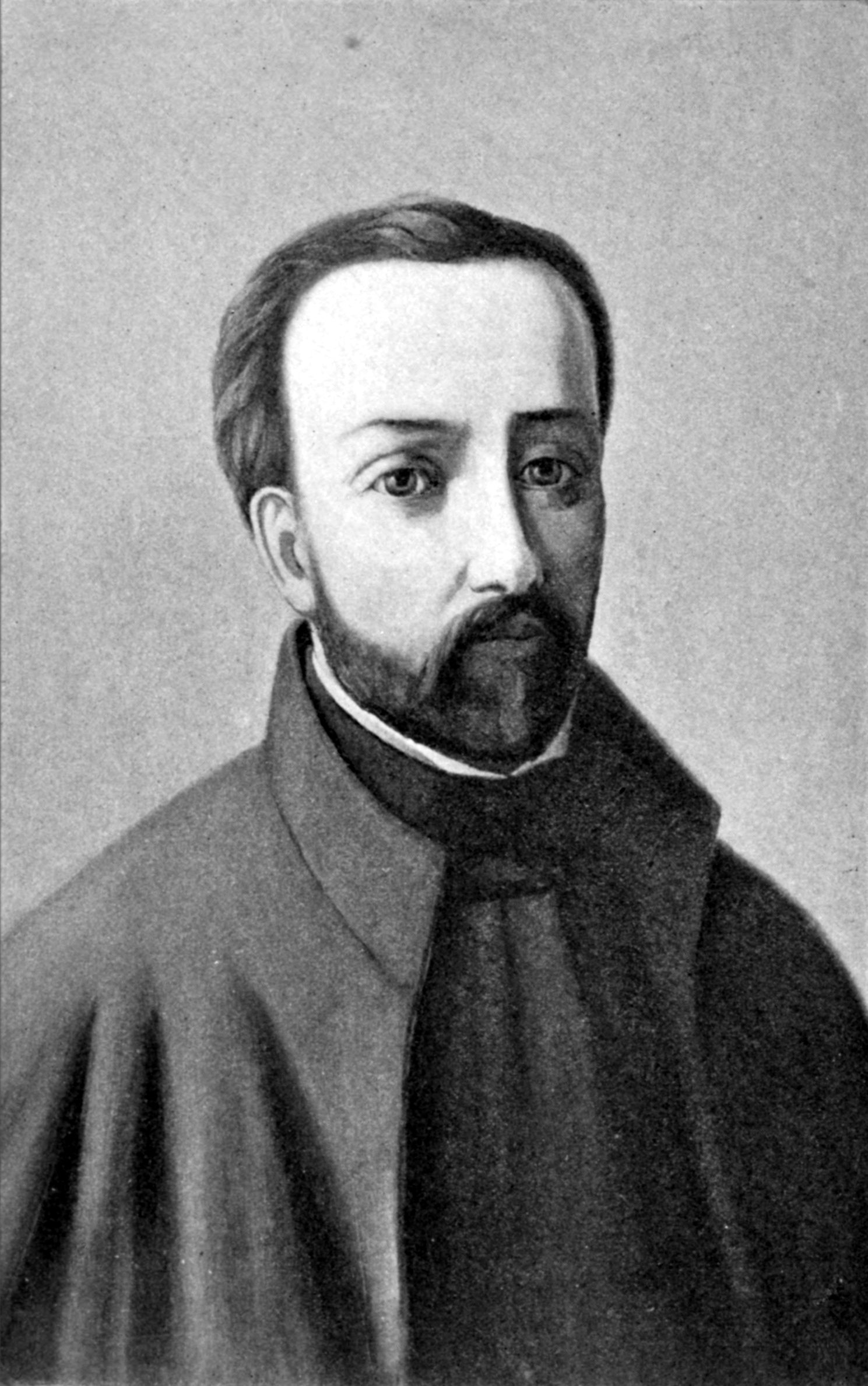
Saint Gabriel Lallemant

- Georg Joseph Kamel, Czech botanist assigned to the Philippines; the Camellia flower was named after him
- Sebastian Kappen, Indian theologian
- Franciszek Kareu, Polonised architect of British descent who was elected Vice General of the Russian province during the suppression of the Society
- Blessed Leonardo Kimura, Japanese martyr
- Eusebio Francisco Kino, missionary and cartographer of Mexico and Arizona
- Athanasius Kircher, 17th-century German scientist; discoverer of microbes
- Saint James Kisai, Japanese martyr
- Lev Kobylinsky, Russian poet, translator and religious theorist
- Adam Adamandy Kochański, Polish mathematician and clockmaker
- Anthony Kohlmann, early Catholic priest in New York whose decision not to testify established American precedent for "priest-penitent privilege" or "clergy confidentiality" in law
- Peter Hans Kolvenbach, linguist; 29th Superior General of the Society of Jesus
- Felix Körner, Islam reseacher
- Adam Krupski, professor of philosophy, legal expert on the legislation of the Grand Duchy of Lithuania, author of the school dialogue.
- Cardinal Ján Chryzostom Korec, Prisoner for Christ
- Saint Stanislaus Kostka, patron saint of Jesuit novices
- George Kovalenko, Russian convert from Eastern Orthodoxy
- Adam Kozłowiecki, Polish Dachau concentration camp survivor, missionary in Zambia, archbishop of Lusaka and Cardinal
- Franz Xaver Kugler, Doctor of chemistry and mathematics; known also for his Babylonian studies
- Kurien Kunnumpuram, Indian theologian (Ecclesiology)
- Thomas Kunnunkal, Indian educationist and writer

== L ==
Włodzimierz Ledóchowski, Superior General 1915-1942

- Saint Jean de Lalande, North American martyr
- Saint Gabriel Lalemant, North American martyr
- Quentin Lauer, American priest, philosopher and Hegel scholar
- Antoine Lavalette, French priest, slave-owning missionary in Martinique whose unpaid debts contributed to the Jesuits being banned in France in 1764
- Pierre de Lauzon, superior of the Jesuits in New France
- Włodzimierz Ledóchowski, Polish Superior General of the Society of Jesus
- Gabriel Lenkiewicz, Polish teacher and architect, elected Vicar General of the Russian province during there suppression of the Society
- Leonardus Lessius, Belgian moral theologian and writer on economics
- Saint David Lewis, Welsh martyr
- Constant Lievens, Apostle of Chotanagpur, Flemish Jesuit who worked among the Adivasis of Central India
- Segundo Llorente, Spanish-born priest in rural western Alaska; was elected by write-in vote to the Alaska House of Representatives in 1960 by residents of the Wade Hampton district, becoming the first Catholic priest to serve in a U.S. state legislature
- William Lonc, professor of physics and translator of French-Canadian Jesuit records into English
- Bernard Lonergan, Canadian philosopher and theologian, Companion of the Order of Canada
- Cardinal Henri de Lubac, French theologian, and patrologist

== M ==
Jacques Marquette, the French Jesuit missionary who founded Michigan's first European settlement

- Marius Macrionitis, Archbishop of Athens
- Jack Mahoney, ethicist and moral theologian
- Louis Maimbourg
- Matt Malone, 14th editor in chief of America magazine
- Joseph Maréchal, Belgian transcendental philosopher
- Juan de Mariana
- Jacques Marquette, French explorer of the Mississippi and Northern Michigan areas
- James Martin, author of My Life With the Saints and The Jesuit Guide to (Almost) Everything; culture editor of the America magazine
- Malachi Martin, author of sixteen books, had three Ph.Ds, spoke ten languages
- Ignacio Martín-Baró, martyr of El Salvador
- Martino Martini, Italian missionary to China, linguist and published the first Chinese Atlas and the first Ancient History and a chronicle of the tartarian war
- Cardinal Carlo Maria Martini, Italian scripture scholar, Archbishop Emeritus of Milan
- William Francis Masterson, American educator to the Philippines; (Ateneo de Manila University, Xavier University – Ateneo de Cagayan), founder of the Xavier University - Ateneo de Cagayan College of Agriculture
- Saint Lèon-Ignance Mangin, martyred in China
- Juan Francisco Masdeu, historian
- Blessed Julien Maunoir, 17th-century missionary to the Breton people
- Blessed Rupert Mayer, Servant of God, resisted the Nazis
- John McElroy, one of two of the Army's first Catholic Chaplains. Chaplain during the Mexican–American War, founder of St. John's Literary Institute, Boston College High School, and Boston College.
- Horace McKenna, founder of So Others Might Eat and advocate of the Sursum Corda Cooperative
- John McLaughlin, American political commentator; left the Jesuits after a failed bid for a Senate seat in Rhode Island
- Richard McSorley (1914–2002), peace activist; peace studies Professor at Georgetown University.
- Domingo Patricio Meagher, Spanish writer and university professor of Irish descent
- Anthony de Mello, Indian spiritual guide and writer
- Everard Mercurian, Belgian, 4th Superior General of the Society of Jesus
- Brice Meuleman, Belgian, 2nd Archbishop of Calcutta (now Kolkata)
- Saint Paulo Miki, Japanese martyr
- John Ming, Swiss Jesuit
- Jorge Loring Miró, Spanish Jesuit
- Ignacio Molarja, explorer and missionary to New Spain
- Yves de Montcheuil, French philosopher, theologian, and French resistant.
- Segundo Montes, martyr of El Salvador
- Saint Henry Morse, English martyr
- Simon Le Moyne, French New World explorer
- Franz Magnis-Suseno, German-born Indonesian Jesuit priest and philosopher
- W. G. Read Mullan, American academic and university president
- Joseph Anthony Murphy, Irish missionary, bishop and vicar apostolic to Belize, Central America
- John Courtney Murray, American theologian credited with the drafting of the Second Vatican Council Declaration on Religious Freedom
- Robert Murray, English scholar of Syriac

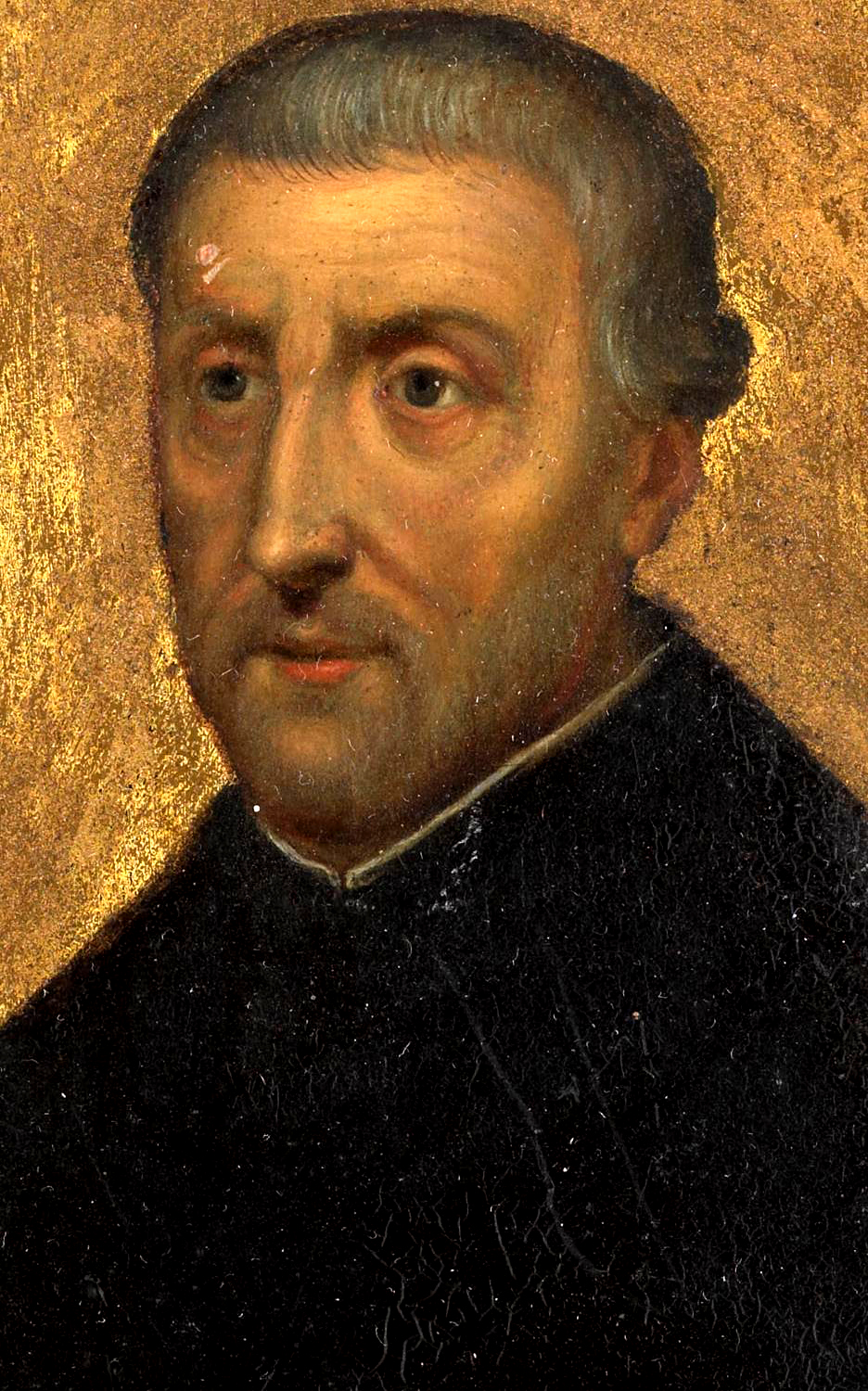
Petrus Canisius, a theologian to whom the restoration of Catholicism in Germany after the Reformation is credited

== N ==
- John E. Naus, dean of students and associate professor at Marquette University
- Bienvenido Nebres, Philippine National Scientist, mathematician & former president of the Ateneo de Manila University
- Oswald von Nell-Breuning, German 'father' of Catholic social teaching (1890–1991)
- Terence Netter, painter and former priest
- Adolfo Nicolás, 30th Superior General of the Society of Jesus
- Roberto de Nobili, Italian missionary to India; linguist
- Manuel da Nóbrega, Portuguese founder of the Brazilian city of Rio de Janeiro
- Charles de Noyelle, Belgian 12th Superior General of the Society of Jesus

== O ==
- Mikołaj Stanisław Oborski (1576–1646), Polish teacher
- Bernard Michael O'Brien, New Zealand Jesuit priest and philosopher
- Joseph T. O'Callahan, U.S. Navy chaplain; awarded Medal of Honor
- Saint John Ogilvie, Scottish martyr
- Joseph A. O'Hare, former president of Fordham University and chairman of the New York City Charter Revision Commission and the first New York City Campaign Finance Board
- Gian Paolo Oliva, Italian 11th Superior General of the Society of Jesus
- John W. O'Malley, American academic and Catholic historian
- William O'Malley, author and actor (played Father Joe Dyer in The Exorcist)
- Walter J. Ong, American cultural historian and spiritual writer
- Wilhelm Josef Oomens, painter
- John H. O'Rourke, American retreat leader and master of novices
- Saint Nicholas Owen, martyr saint of England and Wales

== P ==
- Mitch Pacwa, scholar; host on EWTN
- Francesco Palliola, Italian missionary and martyr in the Philippines
- Kuruvilla Pandikattu, Indian philosopher
- Lorenzo Hervás y Panduro, pioneer philologist
- Raimon Panikkar, Spanish priest, theologian, philosopher, interfaith dialogist, scholar, writer and chemist
- Álvarez de Paz, preacher and mystic
- Péter Pázmány, Cardinal, Archbishop of Esztergom, leader of the Catholic revival in Hungary
- Ferdinand Perier, Belgian, 3rd Archbishop of Calcutta (now Kolkata)
- Denis Pétau, French scholar and theologian
- François Para du Phanjas, French writer
- Giambattista Pianciani, Italian scientist
- Joseph Pignatelli, Italian leader of the Jesuits in exile
- John Pinasco, Italian theologian and educator to America
- Luca Pinelli, Italian scholar and theologian
- Bartolomé Pou, Spanish writer
- John Powell, American author and professor
- Andrea Pozzo, great artist of the Baroque genre

== R ==
- Karl Rahner, 20th-century German theologian
- Samuel Rayan, Indian proponent of liberation theology
- Saint Bernardino Realino, pastor of Lecce
- Sebastian Redford, 18th-century author
- Joseph Redlhamer, 18th-century Austrian physics professor and textbook author
- Saint John Francis Regis, French rural missionary preacher
- Karl Leonhard Reinhold
- Franz Retz, Czech 15th Superior General of the Society of Jesus
- Johann Baptist Reus, German-Brazilian religious leader
- Alexandre de Rhodes, French missionary to Vietnam; linguist
- Servant of God Matteo Ricci, Italian missionary to China, linguist and published the first Chinese edition of Euclid's Elements
- Giovanni Battista Riccioli, 17th-century Italian astronomer; devised the system for the nomenclature of lunar features that is now the international standard
- William A. Rice, American missionary, founder of Baghdad College, bishop and vicar apostolic in Belize
- Didier Rimaud, French composer and poet
- Alberto Rivera, claimed to be ex-Jesuit (disputed by Catholic Church), anti-Catholic activist
- Saint Alonso Rodriguez, martyr of the Río de la Plata
- Saint Alphonsus Rodriguez, Jesuit brother; mystic
- Augustin Rösch, Provincial, and significant figure in Catholic resistance to Nazism.
- João Rodrigues Tçuzu ("the Translator"), 16th-century Portuguese missionary who served as a translator for Toyotomi Hideyoshi and Tokugawa Ieyasu, wrote early works on Japanese linguistics, and introduced Western science and culture to Korea through his gifts to the ambassador Jeong Duwon
- Saint José María Rubio, Spanish priest; canonized in 2003
- Antonio Ruiz de Montoya, Jesuit missionary in Paraguay
- Francis Tiburtius Roche, first bishop of the Roman Catholic Diocese of Tuticorin.

== S ==
- Grégoire de Saint-Vincent, contributions to the theory of logarithms
- Karel San Juan, Filipino president of Ateneo de Zamboanga University
- Maciej Kazimierz Sarbiewski, Polish Latin poet of the Counter-Reformation, crowned poet laureate by Pope Urban VIII
- Alonso de Sandoval, missionary to African slaves in Cartagena de Indias, mentor of Saint Peter Claver
- Johann Schreck, 17th-century German polymath and missionary to China
- Gaspar Schott, first published mention of the universal joint
- Carolus Scribani, 17th-century educator and political writer
- Angelo Secchi, astronomer
- Juan Luis Segundo, liberation theologian
- Gerolamo Sersale, astronomer
- Thomas Ewing Sherman, son of U.S. Civil War General William T. Sherman
- Swami Shilananda, Spanish missionary who spent his active years in India
- Piotr Skarga, Polish polemicist, leading figure of the Counter-Reformation in the Polish–Lithuanian Commonwealth and hagiographer
- Tadeusz Ślipko, Polish ethicist
- Pierre-Jean De Smet, American explorer and missionary

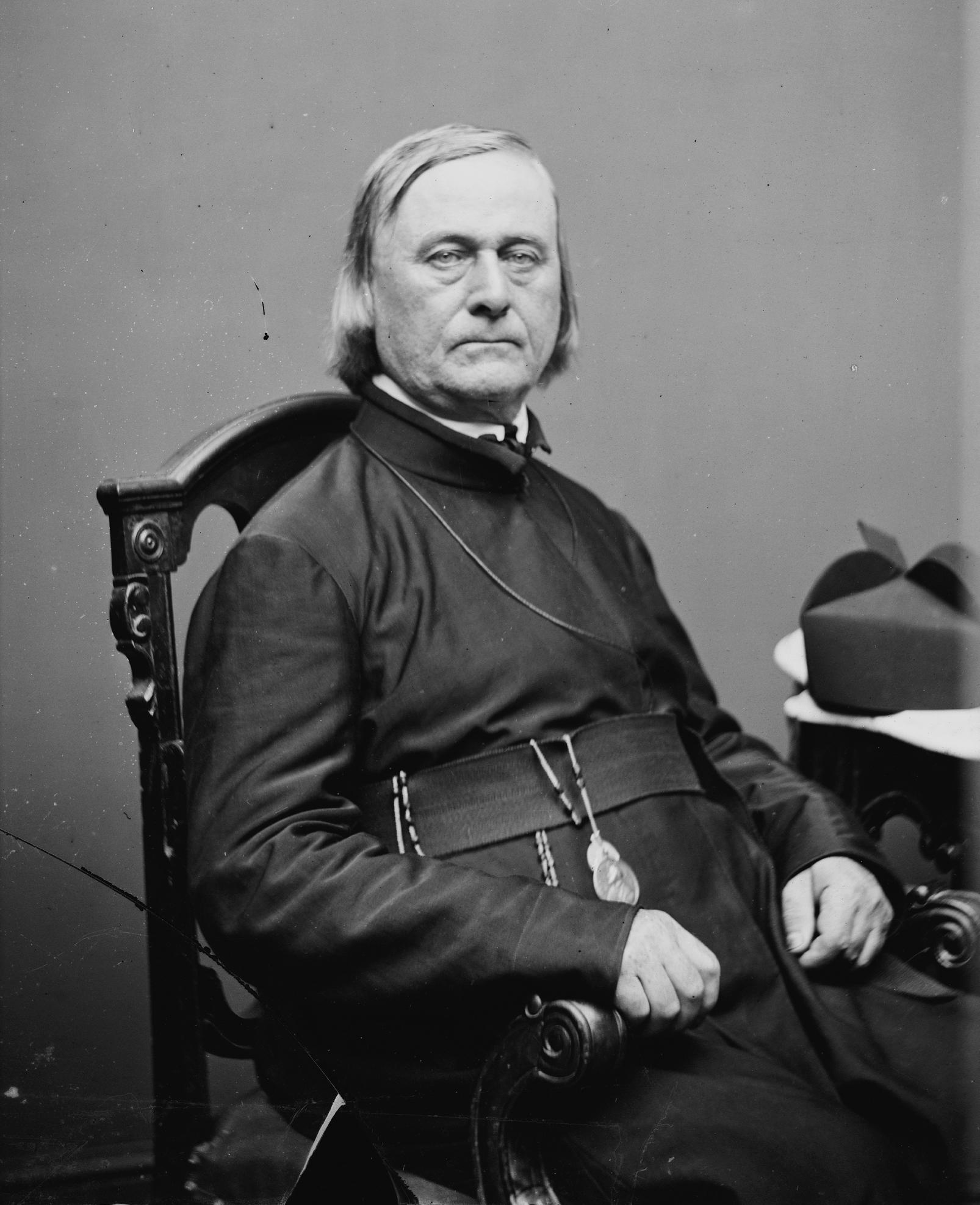
Pierre-Jean De Smet, a missionary to the Native Americans in the Western United States

- Jan Mikołaj Smogulecki, introduced logarithms to China
- Cypriano de Soarez, author of De Arte Rhetorica
- Jon Sobrino, author of Christology at the Crossroads, liberation theologian
- Carlos Sommervogel, scholar and author of Bibliothèque de la Compagnie de Jesus
- Arturo Sosa, 31st Superior General of the Society of Jesus
- Saint Robert Southwell, Elizabethan poet and martyr
- Cardinal Tomáš Špidlík, Czech theologian and professor
- Buck Stanton (Jesuit), naturalist and Jesuit missionary to British Honduras.
- Walter Steins Bisschop, 19th-century Dutch bishop, Vicar Apostolic of Bombay and then Calcutta and 3rd Bishop of Auckland, New Zealand
- Andrew Sterpin, Chinese-born Russian priest who was influential in both Russian and French culture
- Francisco Suárez, scholastic philosopher
- Blessed John Sullivan (Jesuit)|, Irish convert and teacher; renowned for his special interest in the poor
- Jón Sveinsson, Icelandic poet and writer
- Martin Szentiványi, writer
- Ignacije Szentmartony, Croatian mathematician and astronomer
- Stan Swamy, tribal rights activist

== T ==
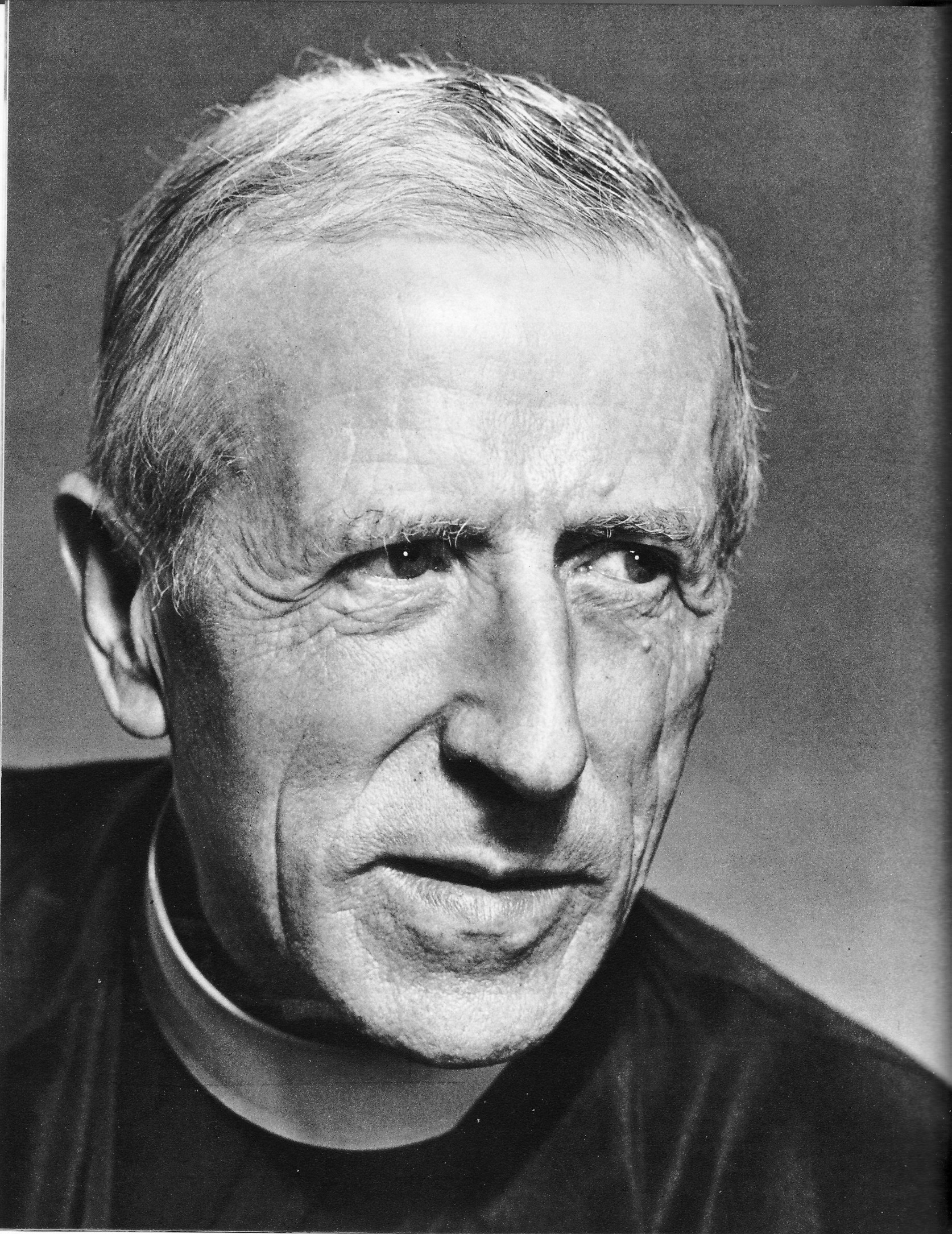
Teilhard in 1955

- Joel Tabora, Filipino philosopher and president of Ateneo de Davao University
- Guy Tachard, two important embassies to Siam
- André Tacquet, Flemish mathematician whose works facilitated the discovery of calculus
- Michelangelo Tamburini, Italian 14th Superior General of the Society of Jesus
- Pierre Teilhard de Chardin, French paleontologist, theologian/philosopher and spiritual writer
- Francesco Lana de Terzi, creator of the first realistic technical plans for an airship
- Richard Thimelby, 17th century English missionary priest, Rector of the College of St Omer
- Antoine Thomas, Belgian astronomer in China
- Vitus Georg Tönnemann, German priest who was the only confessor to Emperor Charles VI of France (1711–1740)
- Girolamo Francesco Tornielli, Italian preacher and writer
- Cosme de Torrès, contemporary of Francis Xavier
- Diego de Torres Bello, pioneer of the Paraguay province
- Pascal Tosi, Italian co-founder of the Alaska Mission
- Nicolas Trigault, early missionary to China
- Michael Alphonsius Shen Fu-Tsung, first Mandarin-speaking Chinese to become a Jesuit
- John Nepomuk Tschupick, Austrian preacher
- George Tyrrell, Anglo-Irish modernist theologian and scholar

== U ==
- Juan José Urráburu, scholastic philosopher

== V ==
- Luca Valerio, corresponded with Galileo Galilei
- Alessandro Valignano, Italian canonical visitor to the Asian missions; promoter of an inculturated missionary approach
- Carlos G. Vallés, writer of Gujarati, English and Spanish languages; and mathematics
- Albert Vanhoye, Biblical scholar and cardinal
- John Vattanky, Indian classical philosopher
- José María Vélaz, founder of Fe y Alegría
- Ferdinand Verbiest, Belgian missionary to China; astronomer and mathematician
- António Vieira, 17th-century Portuguese missionary and diplomat
- Juan Bautista Villalpando, Isaac Newton referred to his works
- Grégoire de Saint-Vincent, Flemish mathematician
- Claude de Visdelou, early missionary to China

== W ==
- Edmund A. Walsh, founder of the School of Foreign Service at Georgetown University
- Saint Henry Walpole, English martyr
- Heinrich Wangnereck, German theologian, preacher, and author
- Anthony Watsham, entomologist with emphasis on scelionidae
- Andrew White (Jesuit), 17th century English Jesuit, influential figure in the early Maryland Colony who led efforts to convert and improve relations with local Native American tribes
- George J. Willmann, American priest regarded as the "Father of the Knights of Columbus in the Philippines" and Servant of God
- Garry Wills, Pulitzer Prize-winning author who was briefly a Jesuit
- Jakub Wujek, scholar and translator

== X ==
- Georges Xenopulos, Greek bishop

== Z ==
- Louis Zhang Jiashu, non-canonical bishop of Shanghai
- Emmanuel Zheng Manuo, first Chinese international student and first Chinese Jesuit priest
- Domenico Zipoli, Italian composer and musician
- Petrus Josephus Zoetmulder, expert in the Old Javanese language and literature
- Giovanni Battista Zupi, mathematician, astronomer

== See also ==
- List of former Jesuits
- List of Jesuit theologians
- List of Jesuit Saints
- List of Jesuit scientists
- Canadian Martyrs
- Jesuit China missions
