= Francolini =

Francolini is an Italian surname. Notable people with the surname include:

- Anna Francolini (born 1973), British actress
- Balthazar Francolini (1650–1709), Italian Jesuit theologian
- David Francolini (born 1969), British drummer
- Francesca Francolini (born 1979), Italian softball player
- Riccardo Francolini, Panamanian banker
