= Entschluss (magazine) =

Entschluß. Jesuiten, Gesellschaft, Spiritualität
- Native name: Der große Entschluß. Monatsschrift für aktives Christentum
- Editor: María Neubrand
- First issue: 1946; 80 years ago
- Final issue Number: 1999; 27 years ago Volume 54
- Country: Austria
- Language: German
- ISSN: 0931-3273

Entschluß. Jesuiten, Gesellschaft, Spiritualität (Entschluss. Jesuits, Society, Spirituality) was an Austrian theological journal.

It was one of several journals published by the Jesuits, including Geist und Leben and Stimmen der Zeit.

== Publication Frequency ==
The journal was published ten to twelve times a year starting in 1946. Beginning with Volume 30 in 1975, the publication frequency was aligned with the calendar year. Publication ceased with Volume 54 in 1999.

== Changes and Variations in the Name ==
- Predecessor journal: Der große Entschluß. Monatsschrift für aktives Christentum. 1946–1969 (Herder Publishing House, Vienna)
- Entschluß. Zeitschrift für Praxis und Theologie. 1969–1983
- Entschluß / Offen. (Vol. 38, 1983, merged with the journal Offen, published by Herold, Vienna)
- Entschluß. Spiritualität, Jesuiten, Gemeinde. Published by Butzon und Bercker, Kevelaer; subsequently by Kulturverlag, Thaur.

== Contents ==
The journal's topics covered the fields of theology, the practice of Christianity, and spirituality—with a particular focus on the order of the editors, the Jesuits. In recent years, approximately one issue per year has been devoted to special topics (e.g., youth, the Bible).

== Publisher ==
The journal was published by the German-speaking Jesuits under the auspices of the Austrian and Swiss Provinces of the Order.

== Notable Members of the Editorial Staff (selection) ==
- Rupert Feneberg
- Wolfgang Feneberg
- Maria Neubrand (Editor-in-Chief 1997–1999)
- Gustav Schörghofer (Editor-in-Chief 1988–1997)
- Georg Sporschill (Editor-in-Chief 1977–1988)
- Josef Steiner
- Gernot Wisser

== Well-known authors (selected) ==
- Christian Cebulj
- Karl Rahner
