= Tornielli =

Tornielli is a surname. Notable people with the surname include:

- Andrea Tornielli (born 1964), Italian journalist and religious writer
- Antonio Tornielli (1579–1650), Italian Roman Catholic bishop
- Bonaventura Tornielli (1411–1491), Italian Roman Catholic priest
- Girolamo Francesco Tornielli (died 1752), Italian Jesuit, preacher and writer
