= ALBOAN =

Coordinates: 42°51′6.02″N 2°40′6.91″W

- Established: 1996; 30 years ago
- Type: Development NGO
- Headquarters: Vitoria-Gasteiz, Spain
- Main organ: ALBOAN
- Affiliations: Jesuit, Catholic
- Website: ALBOAN

ALBOAN is the outreach arm of the Loyola Province of the Society of Jesus for development and social action. It was founded in 1996 but has roots in mission secretariats in San Sebastián, Spain, in Gujarat, India, and in the Far East. It is situated in Spain, specifically in Bilbao, Basque Country and Pamplona, Navarre. In 2004 support for Fe y Alegría was incorporated into ALBOAN. In 2009 offices opened in all provincial capitals and Navarre, with headquarters in Vitoria.
