= Beaubois =

Beaubois or de Beaubois is a French surname. Notable people with this name include:

- Rodrigue Beaubois (born 1988), French basketball player
- Nicolas-Ignace de Beaubois (1689–1770), French-Canadian priest and missionary

== See also ==
- Beau Bois, Newfoundland and Labrador, a postal office and fishing settlement in 1911
