= Finotti =

Finotti is a surname of Italian origin. Notable people with the surname include:

- Joseph M. Finotti (1817-1879), Italian Jesuit, writer, and editor
- Mario Finotti (born 1950), Italian photographer and journalist
- Rick Finotti (born 1981), American football coach
