= Andrew Sterpin =

Andrew Sterpin, SJ (born on August 28, 1923, in Harbin, Manchukuo, China - died on December 3, 2003, Lyon, France) was a Catholic priest, Jesuit, member of the Russian apostolate, teacher and director of Saint George's boarding school in Meudon, that had a great influence in the formation of several generations of Russian students, and also took an active part in the spiritual, cultural and social life of the Russian diaspora in France.

== Biography ==
Born into a family of immigrants in Harbin, his mother was Russian Orthodox and his father a Belgian. Sterpin studied at the Lyceum of Saint Nicholas in Harbin. Before World War II, he moved to Europe in 1942 joined to Catholic Church came from Orthodoxy and after to the novitiate of the Jesuits in Arlon, Belgium. In 1954 in Rome, Bishop Alexander Evreinov ordained him to the priesthood. From 1948 to 2002 he lived in Saint George's boarding school in Meudon at Paris, and from 1956 to 1963 Sterpin was director of Saint George boarding school for children of Russian immigrants. Father Sterpin was also a member of the editorial board of the Symbol (magazine). On pastoral work in the Russian environment corresponded with Archpriest Pavel Grechishkin. In the summer of 1967 as a tourist, he visited the Soviet Union, with sincerity praying in Russian churches and the churches themselves seemed show good condition. After the closure of the Centre in Meudon in 2002 he moved to Lyon, where he lived at the Centre Saint Basil. He died on December 3, 2002.

== Works ==
One of the initiators of the publication of the book «Un collège jésuite pour les Russes:« Saint-Georges »: De Constantinopole à Meudon. 1921-1992 "(Paris, 1993) (" St. George: Boarding school for children of Russian immigrants in France, " St. Petersburg, 2003).

Edited the Russian translation of the Jesuit Ivan Gagarin "The primacy of the Apostle Peter and the liturgical books of the Russian Church" (1863).
