= José María Vélaz =

- Born: December 4, 1910; Rancagua, Chile
- Died: July 18, 1985 (aged 74); San Ignacio del Masparro, Barinas, Venezuela
- Occupation(s): Jesuit priest, educator
- Years active: 1928–1985
- Known for: founding Fe y Alegría pioneering popular education in Latin America

José María Vélaz (December 4, 1910 – July 18, 1985) was a Chilean-born Jesuit priest and educator. He is known for founding Fe y Alegría (Faith and Joy), a partnership between Jesuit priests, university students and families that began in 1955 in Caracas, Venezuela, and sought community mobilization and the provision of high-quality education for children from impoverished and marginalized communities. Vélaz's work is regarded as a social movement that was pivotal in Jesuit education's shift from the development of middle- and upper-class youth to the popularization of education for the underprivileged in Latin America.

== Early life and education ==
José María Vélaz was born December 4, 1910, in Rancagua, Chile, into a Spanish Christian family. When he was a child, Vélaz's grandmother instilled in him an early love of La Virgen. He grew up learning the stories of saints such as Ignacio de Loyola and enjoyed reading and imagining himself as a hero of the stories he read and created. Vélaz attended primary school at O'Higgins Institute and when he was 10 years old—five years after the sudden death of his father—Vélaz's mother took him and his three younger siblings on a boat to live in Spain in the hope that they would receive a better education. His family settled in Loyola and his mother, who never remarried, sent Vélaz and his siblings to Jesuit school. As a child, Vélaz interned and attended secondary school at Xavier College, Tudela. He later began law studies at the University of Zaragoza.

== Jesuit ==
In 1928, Vélaz left his university studies to join the Society of Jesus. In 1934, he and other Jesuit brothers were exiled by the Spanish Republic, so he left Spain for Belgium and studied Greek, Latin and Castilian literature at the Catholic University of Louvain. While awaiting his order to minister in Wuhu, China, Vélaz was instead assigned to go to Venezuela in 1936. He was unable to say goodbye to his family before his departure because a civil war had broken out. Because it was difficult for religious figures to obtain visas at the time, Vélaz entered Venezuela disguised as a cloth and wine merchant. Risking deportation upon his arrival, he served as a teacher at San Ignacio de Caracas School until 1939 and founded the Center Excursionista Loyola (Loyla Hiking Center). In 1939, Vélaz was able to return to Spain to study theology in Oña until 1945.

Vélaz began his priesthood with a focus on supporting the impoverished and marginalized people of Venezuela through education, which he believed would facilitate personal development and social engagement for the groups. From 1946 to 1948, he served as spiritual father of San Ignacio de Caracas School. From 1948 to 1954, he was rector of San José de Mérida School. During his tenure, Vélaz purchased San Javier del Valle, 800 hectares of land meant for comprehensive forestry development. He founded the House of Spiritual Exercises of San Javier del Valle Grande in honor of the 27 former students who died in a plane crash in December 1950, as well as a school network in the Andes region that depended on San José de Mérida School. Upon learning from his former students that a project was underway to open the road from Barinas to San Cristóbal, Vélaz designed a plan for a school network in the Barinas plains after completing his rectorate. However, the plan was not approved by the Society of Jesus, which ordered Vélaz to serve as director of spirituality and professor of humanities at Andrés Bello Catholic University in Caracas in 1954.

=== Fe y Alegría ===
With the support of volunteers from the university, Vélaz founded Fe y Alegría in 1955 in Caracas, Venezuela, to provide free public education to children from impoverished and marginalized groups living in the area. After local residents Abraham and Patricia Reyes heard about Vélaz's cause, they donated their home to him and it became the initiative's first school. In 1960, Vélaz forwent his commitment at Andrés Bello Catholic University to fully commit to Fe y Alegría.

== Death and legacy ==
In 1974, Vélaz underwent heart surgery in Houston, Texas. The following year, he retired to El Valle, Mérida, and his brother José Manuel took over as manager of Fe y Alegría. Before his death, Vélaz was working on several projects, including the expansion of Fe y Alegría into Africa and the start of a school network for the native people of Gran Sabana. He was also supporting the development of a chain of agricultural schools based in San Ignacio del Masparro, Venezuela, where he died of a heart attack on July 18, 1985.

For his work on Fe y Alegría, Vélaz is considered a pioneer of the popular education movement in Latin America. By 1992, Fe y Alegría had expanded to a network of more than 500 schools across the region. By 2007, the organization served approximately 1 million primary and secondary students from impoverished and marginalized groups in Latin America, the Caribbean, Europe and Africa. As of 2014, national branches of Fe y Alegría, such as that of El Salvador, also offer vocational programs as alternatives to gangs and emigration. Today, both San Ignacio del Masparro in Barinas and San Javier del Valle in Mérida are examples of schools that offer their students the opportunity to receive an additional farming and forestry education.

== Honors and awards ==
In 1980, Andrés Bello Catholic University awarded Vélaz an honorary Doctorate in Education for his work as a distinguished educator.

== Published works ==
- 1987: Cartas del Masparro
