= Peter Michael Brillmacher =

German Jesuit Preacher during the Early Counter-Reformation

Peter Michael Brillmacher was a German Jesuit who was active in preaching Catholic doctrine in the early part of the Counter Reformation.
