= Wilhelm Josef Oomens =

Dutch painter

Wilhelm Josef Oomens SJ (1918 – 2007) was a Dutch Jesuit priest and painter who was a pastor in Germany. In 1949, he entered the congregation of the Society of Jesus (Jesuits). He was the longstanding director of the centre of orientation and cultural studies in Limburg, Netherlands. From 1985 to 2005, he was a pastor in Eschweiler, Germany, and worked on his painting. His illustrated book, Worte in Bildern Erleben, was published by Verlag Dohr. He died in 2007.

== Works ==
The emphasis of his art was the rendering and interpretation of biblical motifs. He painted the Christmas story (In dulci jubilo, 1991, The Adoration of the Magi) and the history of Jesus' suffering (for example Man of Sorrows, Stations of the Cross, 1994, The body of Jesus taken off the cross, 1981 and 1992, and Ecce Homo) and his resurrection and the coronation of the Eucharist (The doubting Thomas, 1993; The path to the Light, 1998).

The manner of painting shows the clear influence of such classical Dutch masters as Lucas van Leiden and Hieronymus Bosch.

He also painted mythological scenes (for example, Phaeton in 1978, and The Three Graces in 1983).

== Works ==
- Wilhelm Josef Oomens: Worte in Bildern erleben. Verlag Dohr, 2000 (an anthology of selected works of W.J. Oomens, with meditative texts in English and German)
- Schriften aus der Röher Zeit Band I: Philosophisch-theologische Unterweisungen (1997 – 2000). epubli, 2023. ISBN 9783757570569
- 150 Jahre Pfarre St. Antonius Eschweiler-Röhe (published by St. Antony's Parish, Eschweiler-Röhe, 1995)
