= Riccardo Francolini =

Panamanian banker

Riccardo Francolini is a Panamanian banker. Francolini has been accused of corruption and found innocent.

== See also ==
- Crime in Panama
- Economy of Panama
