= Francis Bennon Ducrue =

German missionary

Francis Bennon Ducrue was a missionary in Mexico, b. in Munich, Bavaria, of French parents, 10 June 1721; d. there 30 March 1779.

== Biography ==
Ducrue became a member of the Society of Jesus in 1738, and ten years later was sent to California, where he worked until the expulsion of the order in 1767. At the time, Ducrue was the superior of all the California missions. He submitted to the decree of expulsion and cooperated with the royal commission in enforcing its provisions. The Jesuits withdrew, taking with them only their clothes and a few books; these were the belongings they carried away from California after seventy years of work in its missions. Ducrue returned to his native land.

== Works ==
Ducrue wrote A Journey from California through the district of Mexico to Europe in the year 1767 in Latin. The book was translated into German for the Nachrichten von verschiedenen Ländern des spanischen Amerika of Christoph Gottlieb von Murr (vol. XII, p. 217-276), and was translated into French and published by Auguste Carayon in his Documents Inédits (Paris, 1876).

Murr also gives some specimens of the language of California, which were communicated to him by Ducrue.
