= Honoré-Gaspard de Coriolis =

French Roman Catholic cleric and historian

- Born: 1735; Aix-en-Provence, France
- Died: 14 May 1824 (aged 88–89); Paris, France
- Occupations: Clerical advisor Church cleric Historian

Honoré-Gaspard de Coriolis (1735–1824) was a French Roman Catholic cleric and historian.

== Biography ==
=== Early life ===
Honoré-Gaspard de Coriolis was born in 1735 in Aix-en-Provence.

=== Career ===
He served as a clerical advisor to the Parlement of Aix-en-Provence.

A Jesuit, he served as vicar general of the Roman Catholic Diocese of Mende. Later, he served as a canon in Notre-Dame de Paris, the Roman Catholic cathedral in Paris.

In his writings, he explained that Provence during the Ancien Régime was linked to the Kingdom of France without being its subaltern.

=== Death ===
He died on 14 May 1824 in Paris. His nephew was Gaspard-Gustave Coriolis (1792–1843).

== Bibliography ==
- Traité sur l'administration du comté de Provence (Aix-en-Provence: Imprimerie de Vve A. Adibert, 1786-1788, 3 volumes).
- Dissertation sur les états de Provence (Aix-en-Provence: Remondet-Aubin, 1867).
