= Raymond Helmick =

Raymond Helmick, SJ was an American Jesuit, peacemaker, theologian and author. Helmick worked as a professor at Boston College and the Boston Theological Institute. Helmick travelled around the world as an emissary for peace. Helmick founded the US Interreligious Committee for Peace in the Middle East.

Helmick was born in Arlington, Massachusetts. He went on to graduate from Boston College High School. Helmick studied philosophy at Weston Jesuit School of Theology, taught history and religion at St. George's College, Jamaica, studied theology at Sankt Georgen in Frankfurt, Germany, and was ordained a priest in the Frankfurt Cathedral in 1963.

After his death, Boston College developed the Helmick Memorial Lecture.

== Books ==
- A Social Option: A Social Planning Approach to the Problems of Northern Ireland, with Richard Hauser.
- La Situation libanaise selon Raymond Eddé.
- Forgiveness and Reconciliation: Religion, Social Policy and Conflict Transformation. Ed., with Rodney L. Petersen.
- Negotiating Outside the Law: Why Camp David Failed.
- Living Catholic Faith in a Contentious Age.
- Faith Elements in Conflicts
- Living Catholic Faith in a Contientious Age - The Crisis in Confidence
