= Tadeusz Ślipko =

Polish Jesuit and philosopher (1918–2015)

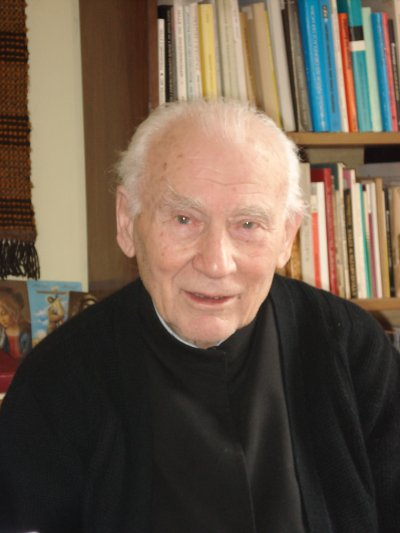
Tadeusz Slipko

Tadeusz Ślipko (January 18, 1918, in Stratyn near Rohatyn, now in Ukraine – May 1, 2015, in Kraków) was a Polish Jesuit and philosopher, chiefly an ethicist.

== Biography ==
He studied at the John Casimir University in Lwów (1937-1939). In 1939, he entered the Society of Jesus and underwent a two-year noviciate in Stara Wieś near Krosno. He studied philosophy at the Jesuit Faculty of Philosophy in Kraków (because of the war transferred temporarily to Nowy Sącz), 1941-1944, and theology at the Bobolanum Jesuit Faculty of Theology in Warsaw (because of the war transferred temporarily to Nowy Sącz and Stara Wieś), 1944-1948. He was ordained a priest in 1947. He studied ethics and sociology at the Jagellonian University in Kraków (1948-1952), where he earned a Ph.D.

Ślipko was a lecturer in ethics at the Jesuit Faculty of Philosophy in Kraków (1948-1968), at the Pontifical Faculty of Theology in Kraków (1963-1975) and at the Faculty of Christian Philosophy of the Academy of Catholic Theology in Warsaw (1965-1988), where he obtained his habilitatio (1967), became an associate professor (1973) and a full professor (1982).

He was a dean of the Jesuit Faculty of Philosophy in Kraków (1957-1964) and at the Faculty of Christian Philosophy of the Academy of Catholic Theology in Warsaw (1976-1980).

== Work ==
Ślipko's ethics took its inspiration from the Thomistic traditions. He also took into consideration new currents of philosophical and ethical thought, especially the personalistic and axiological tendencies. According to Ślipko himself, his ethics is “an axiomatic version of the Christian ethics”.

== Books ==
• Zagadnienie godziwej obrony sekretu [The Problem of the equitable defense of the secret], Warszawa 1968, Kraków 2009.

• Etyczny problem samobójstwa [Ethical Problem of the Suicide], Warszawa 1970, Kraków 2008.

• Zarys etyki ogólnej [Outline of general ethics], Kraków 1974, 2009^{5}.

• Życie i płeć człowieka [Human Life and Sex], Kraków 1978.

• Zarys etyki szczegółowej, I–II [Outline of special ethics], Kraków 1982, 2005^{2}.

• Granice życia. Dylematy współczesnej bioetyki [Limits of the life. Dilemmata of the contemporary bioethics], Warszawa 1988, Kraków 1994^{2}, 3^{d} ed. entitled Bioetyka, Kraków 2009.

• Za czy przeciw życiu [For [pro) life or against life] (Kraków 1992).

• Rozdroża ekologii [Cross-roads of ecology], (coauthor A. Zwoliński, Kraków 1999.

• Kara śmierci z teologicznego i filozoficznego punktu widzenia [Capital punishment from theological and philosophical standpoint of view] (Kraków 2000).

• Kara śmierci [Capital punishment] (Kraków 2010).

• 9 dylematów etycznych [9 ethical dilemmata] (Kraków 2010).

• Historia etyki w zarysie [History of ethics] (Kraków 2010).

• Spacerem po etyce [Sauntering the ethics] (Kraków 2010).
