= Edward Alacampe =

Edward Alacampe (1581 – 6 February 1646), an English Jesuit, became a member of the English College, Rome in 1605. Three years later he entered the Society of Jesus; in 1614, he was at the new college in Liège. Afterwards, he held the office of procurator at Rome, and died in the house of probation at Ghent.
