= Geist und Leben =

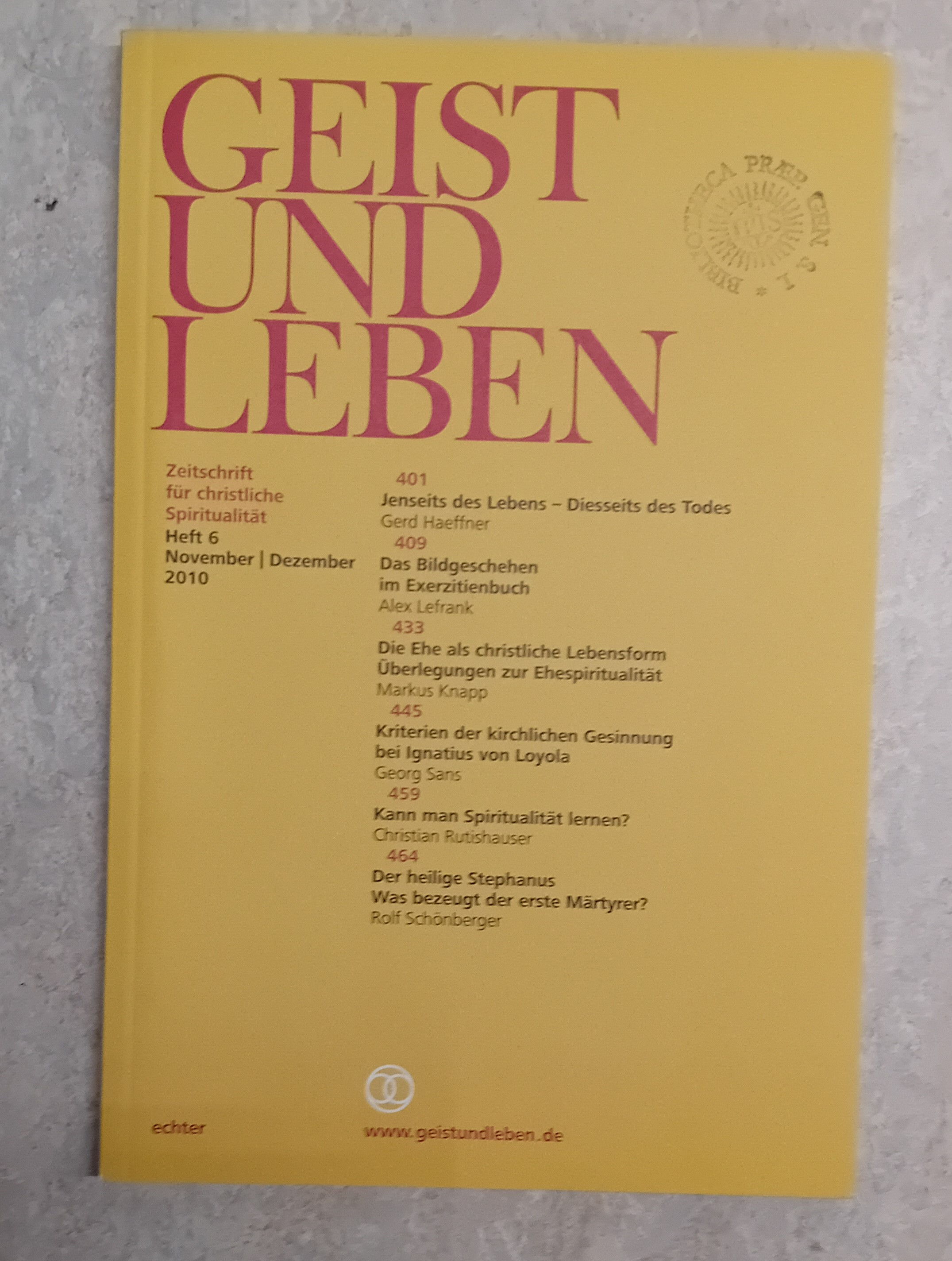
Couverture (2010)

Geist und Leben. Zeitschrift für christliche Spiritualität (Spirit and Life. Review for Christian Spirituality) is a bimonthly review published by the German Society of Jesus. Dedicated to the theology of spiritual life, Christian mysticism, and the spiritual practice thereof, it is the only review its kind in German. It appears six times per year, with 80 pages each issue.

Geist und Leben was founded 1926 in Innsbruck as Zeitschrift für Aszese und Mystik (Review for Ascesis and Mysticism). The basic modern concept of the journal was created by F. Friedrich Wulf SJ, the journal's editor from 1947 to 1989, who took part as a theological consultant in the Second Vatican Council (1962–1965). Its theological program is influenced by the Spanish review La vida sobrenatural, founded by J.G. Arintero OP (Bilbao 1921) and the French Revue d’ascetique et de mystique, established by J. de Guibert SJ (Toulouse 1920). Its editorial program is informed by an "integrative spirituality" in the tradition of Ignatius of Loyola, the founder of the Jesuit order. It accepts contributions of quality written in English with a view to translation into German.

The aim of Geist und Leben is to provide a forum in which people from different theological traditions, who are interested in spirituality, reflect on the Holy Spirit's action in the Church and in their personal lives. It has been published under the title Geist und Leben since 1947 (vol. 20) at Echter Verlag in Würzburg, Germany. From 1929 to 2004 the editorial office was located in Munich; today it is located in Cologne. Other Jesuit reviews of Christian spirituality are The Way (Oxford), Christus (Paris), Manresa (Madrid), and Review for Religious (Saint Louis, Missouri).

== Literature ==
- "Zeitschrift für Aszese u. Mystik", in L. Koch (ed.), Jesuiten-Lexikon. Gesellschaft Jesu einst und jetzt. Paderborn 1934, 1869
- August Brunner, "Geist und Leben", in Geist und Leben 20 (1947), 3-11
- Corona Bamberg, "Kennwort Geist und Leben", in Geist und Leben 50 (1977), 3-9
- "Directory of Reviews of Ignatian Spirituality", in Review of Ignatian Spirituality (Bulletin of the Council on Ignatian Spirituality) XXXVI/2 (2006), n. 112, 53-139.
- Andreas Schönfeld, "Integrative Spiritualität. Zum 80. Jahrgang von 'Geist und Leben'", in Geist und Leben 80 (2007), 1-8
- Andreas Schönfeld (ed.), Spiritualität im Wandel. Leben aus Gottes Geist. Festschrift for 75th anniversary of Geist und Leben, with a foreword by Karl Cardinal Lehmann. Echter Verlag, Würzburg 2002, ISBN 3-429-02473-0
- Friedrich Wulf, "50 Jahre Geist und Leben", in Geist und Leben 50 (1977), 1-2
- Ludger A. Schulte, Aufbrauch aus der Mitte. Zur Erneuerung der Theologie christlicher Spiritualität im 20. Jahrhundert - im Spiegel von Wirken und Werk Friedrich Wulfs SJ (1908-1990). Echter Verlag, Würzburg 1998, ISBN 3-429-01987-7
