= Terence Netter =

American painter and Jesuit priest (1929–2020)

- Born: April 12, 1929; New Rochelle, New York
- Died: June 27, 2020 (aged 91); Setauket, New York, U.S.
- Occupation: Painter

Donald Terence Netter (April 12, 1929–June 27, 2020) was an American painter and former Jesuit priest.

== Sources ==
- Blau, Eleanor (February 19, 1978). "A Home For the Arts In Wallingford". The New York Times. ISSN 0362-4331.
- Glueck, Grace (June 20, 1965). "Art Notes: A Priest Who Paints". The New York Times. ISSN 0362-4331.
- O'Brien, John Anthony (1969). Why Priests Leave: The Intimate Stories of Twelve Who Did. Hawthorn Books. pp. 24–25.
- "A Priest Who Chose to Marry". Life. October 25, 1968. pp. 46–48, 52.
- Russell, John (December 13, 1975). "Art: A Pennsylvania Landmark". The New York Times. ISSN 0362-4331.
