= Piotr Abramowicz =

Polish Jesuit

Piotr Abramowicz (1619–1697) was a Polish Jesuit.
