= Diego Francisco Altamirano =

Jesuit and author

Diego Francisco Altamirano was a Jesuit and author, born at Madrid, 26 October 1625; died in Lima, 22 December 1715.

== Biography ==
The son of an influential fiscal of the Council of Castile, he entered the Society of Jesus in March of 1642. Two years later he sailed to the Province of Paraguay, where he became rector of the Colegio Máximo of Córdoba, in 1666. He was chosen as procurator for the 1683 General Congregation, where Thyrsus González de Santalla was chosen as Superior General of the Society of Jesus.

In 1688, he was selected as a visitor to the Jesuit province of the New Kingdom of Granada, that was waiting to be divided into two: New Granada and Quito; the division was made effective in 1696. Altamirano visited many of the key places for the Society of Jesus from the port of Cartagena, to Santafé de Bogotá and Quito. Altamirano reported the condition of the province, stating many faults that included malfunction of different Colegios in the New Kingdom of Granada and low morale in some Jesuits that resided there.

He wrote the Historia de la provincia Peruana de la Compañía de Jésus, of which only the twelfth book was published, in 1891, by Manuel Vicente Ballivian, with a short biographical notice from the pen of Torres Saldamando. It was followed by another by Altamirano: Breve noticia de las misiones de los infieles que tiena la Compañía de Jésus en esta provincia del Peru, en las provincias de los Mojos, also with introduction by Saldamando.

== See also ==
- Catholic Church in Spain
- Catholic Church in Peru
