= Domingo Patricio Meagher =

Spanish Jesuit priest, professor, and writer

Domingo Patricio Meagher (1703–1772), known as the Father Meagher (Aita Meagher in Basque) was a Spanish Jesuit priest, university professor and writer of Irish descent. He was born in San Sebastian, Spain on 17 March 1703 and died in Florence, Grand Duchy of Tuscany on 21 September 1772. His father was an Irish merchant, who had settled in the Basque city.

== Biography ==
At 14, he and his brother Daniel joined the Society of Jesus. In 1736 he went on to profess the Society's vows in San Sebastian. He became a professor of philosophy at the University of Santiago and professor of theology at the universities of Salamanca and Valladolid. He eventually returned to the Jesuit community in his hometown. Following the expulsion of the Jesuits in 1767 he went into exile along with his companions, dying a few years later, on 21 September 1772 in Florence, at 69 years of age. In his hometown, San Sebastian, a square, the Father Meagher/Aita Meagher Plaza was dedicated to his memory in 1994.

== Works ==
=== Literary works ===
Besides teaching, Father Meagher also produced prose and poetry. There is evidence that he produced various writings but most of them were lost following the expulsion of the Jesuits in 1767 which involved the loss of many of the company's writings. Among his works the following are cited:

- Poems about the canonization of Saint Aloysius Gonzaga and Saint Stanislaus Kostka in 1726.
- Satirical verses on Friar Gerund of Campazas, fictional character created by Father Isla in 1758.
- A funeral elegy of Barbara de Braganza, queen consort of King Ferdinand VI of Spain, who died in 1758.
- Writings in defense against several defamatory books against the Jesuits, published in France between 1760 and 1761.
- Briefs on various issues which occurred in the 17th century.

One of Meagher's verses
Gizon bat ardo gabe
Dago erdi hila
Marmar dabiltzak tripak
Ardoaren bila
Baina edan ezkero
Ardoa txit ongi
Gizonik txatarrenak
Balio ditu bi

Translation
A man without wine
is half dead
the guts go growling
looking for wine
But once drank
wine is very good
the man most useless
sorry for the two

== The Basque language ==
Father Meagher managed to fill a small gap in the history of Basque literature, having preserved the language in several poems written in Basque. These managed to retain its popularity and were transcribed in songbooks and magazines during the nineteenth and first half of the twentieth.

It is told that Meagher, recovering from an illness, was taking wine as a prescription to relieve his ailments. Meagher was able to recover from the illness and, grateful for the relief he had found in wine, wrote some verses in which he praised the qualities of wine. Meagher's poems in Basque all deal with the same theme, for this they can be described as Basque poetry:

- Ardo zarraren kantak seikotan - (Songs about old wine in sextets).
- Ardoa o Ni naiz txit gauza goxoa - ( Wine or I'm a very sweet thing).
- Erroman eta Parisen o Matsaren zumua - (In Rome and Paris or Grape juice).
- Ardoari, Zortziokoa ardoari o Gizon bar ardo bage - ( Wine, an Octet to wine or A man without wine).
