= Swami Shilananda =

Spanish Jesuit missionary (1925–2022)

Swami Shilananda (born Pere Julià Mayol; 17 June 1925 – 15 December 2022) was a Spanish Jesuit missionary who lived in India from 1948 to 2017. He spent most of his missionary life in and around Nashik, in Maharashtra. He founded the Sanjivan Ashram at Lonarwadi, Sinnar, in the State of Maharashtra, India.

== Life ==
Pere Julià Mayol born in 1925 in the Catalan village of Gelida, where he witnessed the ravages his homeland went through during the Spanish Civil War. He entered the Society of Jesus as a novice in August 1945, the month the first atomic bomb was dropped on Hiroshima, Japan. He later said that both experiences strongly marked his outlook and goals in life, determining him to work for peace.

After his novitiate and a year of juniorate at Veruela, in 1948 he was sent to India. He was 23 years old, still a Jesuit scholastic, and travelled in the company of seven other fellow Jesuits, including Angelo Benedetti (later:Swami Shubhananda). He was ordained a Catholic priest on 24 March 1960 and made his final vows on 5 November 1976.

After some years of formation and learning of languages, he was sent as formator and professor of Latin, in 1955, to the Bombay Seminary. In 1962 he was sent to Pune to learn Marathi. From 1963 to 1966 he worked in Manikpur - Vasai, where he adopted the name Shilananda. At some point he also adopted the dress of an Indian sannyasi. From 1966 to 1968 he was in Nashik, ministering in a farm owned by the Society of Jesus and making explorations for possible pastoral work.

In 1968 he received permission from Fr Juan Masià to live outside the Jesuit community in a rented space at Panchavati on the banks of the Godavari river.

During this period he made the traditional Hindu pilgrimage to the four Hindu holy places – Kedarnath, Dwarka, Kanyakumari, Puri – on cycle; as such he was highly regarded by the sannyasis gathered in Nashik for the Kumbha Mela. An account of the Kedarnath pilgrimage in 1975 may be found in Darshan: Da Bombay all'Himalaya in bicletta in ricerca di Dio.

After 14 years at Panchavati, in 1987 he moved to the outskirts of Sinnar, some 20 km out of Nashik, where he purchased a one-acre plot of land with help from friends and constructed a small church (1988) in the style of the small traditional Hindu Shiva temples that abound in the area, and two small houses to serve as a residence, etc. Eventually, he also constructed another small space to serve as a dormitory for guests.

Shilananda would chant his prayers to the accompaniment of an ektara in his chapel and also in the surrounding villages. By means of kirtans (one on Cain and Abel, the other on the Prodigal Son) he taught the local villagers about Christ but took no converts, as he insisted that conversion must be a total change of one's life to the values taught by Jesus.

An interesting aspect of Shilananda's activity was his ecological concern: since the one-acre plot was fenced off, the native grasses and plants had the chance to flourish. Shilananda also personally dug out a little tank at one end of the compound, and dug the rocky soil in other places in order to plant trees. The place today remains a little oasis of greenery amidst the barren surroundings. Unfortunately, with the new Sinnar-Ghoti bypass nearby, the price of land has gone up and plots around the ashram are being bought up rapidly.

With advancing age, Shilananda retired from the Sinnar ashram to the Jesuit infirmary in Andheri, Mumbai. In 2017 he went back to his native Spain, and lived in the community of Barcelona-Javier (Sarrià). In 2021 he was sent to the Jesuit infirmary "Centro Borja de Sant Cugat del Vallés," at Sant Cugat del Vallès, near Barcelona, Spain. He insisted on maintaining his sannyasi clothes even during these years.

He died in Sant Cugat on 15 December 2022, at the age of 97.

== Bibliography ==
=== Primary ===
- The Truth Will Make You Free. Anand: Gujarat Sahitya Prakash, 1979. 390 pp.
- Satya tumhala mukta karil. Marathi tr. by S.N. Suryavanshi of The Truth Will Make You Free.
- Darshan. Da Bombay all'Himalaya in bicletta in ricerca di Dio. Milano: Editrice Missioni, [1979].
- A Rainbow of Feasts: An Inter-religious Appreciation. Better Yourself Books, 2006 (reprint). 281 pp.
- Sent Forth. (Collected Writings). Half a Century at the Service of Evangelization in Independent India. St Paul. 612 pp. 2002?
- "Hinduism and Christianity: A Comparative Study." Divyadaan: Journal of Philosophy and Education 8/3 (1999) 62–83.
- "Integrating Christianity and Hinduism." Divyadaan: Journal of Philosophy and Education 9/1 (1998) 18–40.
- "Objective Truth." Divyadaan: Journal of Philosophy and Education 10/2 (1999) 226–253.
- "Principle of Polarity: Creative Tensions." Divyadaan: Journal of Philosophy and Education 8/2 (1997) 162–172.
- "Justice: Secular or Transcendent?" Divyadaan: Journal of Philosophy and Education 11/2 (2000) 211–271.
- "Mission and Dialogue." Divyadaan: Journal of Philosophy and Education 12/3 (2001) 397–412.
- [Editor.] 'Sanjivan Ashram: Dawn – Noonday – Twilight'. [Correspondence about the mission of Sanjivan Ashram.] Sinnar: Sanjivan Photostat Publication, 2006.
- 'The History of Three Books. [Typescript of 76 pp. Correspondence about and reviews of The Truth Will Make You Free, A Rainbow of Feasts, and Sent Forth.] Sinnar: Sanjivan Ashram, n.d.
- "I've waited for 40 years, but..." Jivan: News and Views of Jesuits in India (Apr. 2008) 90.
- 'The Practice of Dialogue'. [Photocopies and typescript of 86 pp.] Sinnar: Sanjivan Ashram, 2010

=== Secondary ===
- Calle, Ramiro. Autobiografia spiritual. Editorial Kairós, 2012; digital edition 2014. Cap. 5: Cazador de hombres santos.
- Calle, Ramiro. El viaje de mi vida. Madrid: Kailas Editorial, 2021. Cap. 6: Pasó por la vida hacienda el bien.
- Degrez, Etienne. "Indian Road to Truth." Review of The Truth Will Make You Free. The Calcutta Herald (18 Dec. 1981).
- "Freedom through Truth." Review of The Truth Will Make You Free. Ignis (Nov.-Dec. 1981).
- "The Truth Will Make You Free." Review of The Truth Will Make You Free. The New Leader (19 Jul. 1981).
- Hambye, E.R. "The Truth Will Make You Free." Review of The Truth Will Make You Free. Vidyajyoti Journal of Theological Reflection (Jan. 1982).
- Mangatt, George. Review of The Truth Will Make You Free. Bible Bhasyam.
- Patil, B.R. "Book of Instruction on the Christian Religion." Review of Satya tumhala mukta karil. Gavkari (22 Apr. 1984).
- Mendonca, Theresa. Review of A Rainbow of Feasts. The Examiner (8 Jul. 1995).
- Sharma, Anika. Review of A Rainbow of Feasts. The Teenager (Aug. 1995).
- Gopalakrishnan, N. "Inter-Religious Appreciation of Festivals." The Hindu.
- Gispert-Sauch, G. Review of A Rainbow of Feasts. Vidyajyoti Journal of Theological Reflection (Mar. 1996) 215.
- Pereira, Myron J. Review of A Rainbow of Feasts. Jivan: News and Views of Jesuits in India (Aug. 1995) 31.
- Ryan, Thomas M. Review of A Rainbow of Feasts. In Christo (Jan. 1998) 70–72.
- “Mixing Religions- Cross on Shivling, Christian Priests Worship the Hindu Way.” The Week (20 October 1996) 30.
