= John Brignon =

John Brignon, S.J. (1629 – 12 June 1712) was a translator of religious works into French.

== Biography ==
Born in St. Malo, France, he was a member of the Society of Jesus and spent the sixty-five years of his religious life chiefly in the translation of works of piety into French. He died in Paris.

== Translations ==
Among Brignon's translations are the works of De Ponte and Juan Eusebio Nieremberg, the Spiritual Combat, the Imitation of Christ and the short treatises of Robert Bellarmine. All these translations have passed through a number of editions. He edited and revised The Devout Life of St. Francis de Sales and the Fondements of Jean-Joseph Surin. The only works by English authors he translated into French were the Decem Rationes of Edmund Campion and the Tractatus de Misericordia fidelibus defunctis exhibendâ by James Mumford.
