= John Nepomuk Tschupick =

Austrian preacher (1729–1784)

- Church: St. Stephen's Cathedral, Vienna
- Installed: 1763
- Term ended: 20 July 1784

Personal details
- Born: April 1729 Vienna, Austria
- Died: 20 July 1784 (aged 55)
- Denomination: Jesuit, Roman Catholic
- Occupation: Preacher

John Nepomuk Tschupick (7 or 12 April 1729 – 20 July 1784) was a celebrated Austrian preacher.

== Life ==
Nepomuk was born in Vienna. He entered the Jesuit novitiate on 14 October 1744, and, shortly after, was appointed professor of grammar and rhetoric. In 1763, he became a preacher at the cathedral of Vienna, a position which he filled during the remaining twenty-two years of his life. He was viewed positively by Francis I (d. 1765), Maria Theresa (d. 1780), Joseph II (d. 1790), and the imperial Court.

== Works ==
The 1913 Catholic Encyclopedia praises Tschupick's sermons as "remarkable for clearness and logical thought, strength and precision of expression, copiousness and skillful application of Patristic and Biblical texts."

The first edition of his collected sermons was published in ten small volumes with an index volume (Vienna, 1785–7). This edition was supplemented by "Neue, bisher ungedruckte, Kanzelreden auf alle Sonn-und Festtage, wie auch für die heilige Fastenzeit" (Vienna, 1798–1803). A new edition of all his sermons was prepared by Johann Hertkens (5 vols., Paderborn, 1898–1903). An Italian translation was made by Giuseppe Teglio (4 vols., 4th ed., Milan, 1856).
