= Giacomo Maria Airoli =

- Born: 1660; Genoa
- Died: 27 March 1721 (aged 60–61); Rome

Academic work
- Discipline: Oriental studies Hebrew studies
- Institutions: Roman College
- Main interests: Scriptures

Giacomo Maria Airoli (1660 – 27 March 1721) was a Jesuit Orientalist and Scriptural commentator. He was born at Genoa. During his career, he was professor of Hebrew in the Roman College, and later succeeded Cardinal Tolomei in the chair of controversy. His knowledge of Hebrew is shown by his Hebrew translation of a sermon of Pope Clement XI. Airoli died in Rome on 27 March 1721.

== Works ==
Giacomo Maria Airoli is the author of a number of dissertations on scriptural subjects, mostly chronological, which were highly thought of. A full list of his works is found in Carlos Sommervogel's Bibliothèque de la Compagnie de Jésus (Paris, 1890), I, 717. Sommervogel enumerates fourteen works of Airoli's, chief among which are:

- Dissertatio Biblica in qua Scripturæ textus aliquot insigniores, adhibitis linguis hebræa, syriaca, chaldaica, arabica, græca, . . . dilucidantur (Rome, 1704)
- Liber LXX hebdomadum resignatus, seu in cap. IX Danielis dissertatio (Rome, 1713), several times reprinted
- Dissertatio chronologica de anno, mense, et die mortis Domini Nostri Jesus Christi (Rome, 1718)
