= Pavel Grechishkin =

Russian rector (1898–ca. 1965)

Pavel Grechishkin (1898–1965?) was a Russian rector of two Russian Catholic missions.

== Biography ==
Grechishkin was born near Charkov (in modern Ukraine) into the family of an Orthodox priest. In 1920, he emigrated to Czechoslovakia due to Russian Communist persecution against Orthodoxy. In 1921, he was ordained an Orthodox priest. Grechishkin participated in a mission against the Carpathian Greek Catholics, during which he interested about Uniatism. In 1930, believing in the Roman Catholic Church, he converted from Orthodoxy. Enrolled at Catholic University in Olomouc, he served in Vienna. From 1931 to 1945, he was Rector of the Russian Catholic mission in Vienna, and in 1945, with the approach of the Soviet troops, along with parishioners left Vienna. In Paris when Cardinal Eugène Tisserant appointed him rector and was elevated to the rank of archpriest. In 1962, he fell ill and at the end of 1964 retired and left Paris. The subsequent fate is unknown.
