= François Para du Phanjas =

François Para du Phanjas was a French Jesuit writer.
