= Claude Judde =

Claude Judde (1661–1735) was a French Jesuit from Rouen, known for his spiritual writings.

He entered the Society of Jesus on September 18, 1677, and took his final vows on February 2, 1695. He then began preaching, and became quite well known. Bourdaloue desired for Judde to become his successor, but Judde's superiors asked him to sacrifice his talents and train his fellow Jesuits instead. He accepted this obscure office, and from 1704 to 1721 he served as teacher of the third probation at Rouen, and then rector of the Paris novitiate. His lessons were so admired that his students would copy them to preserve their memories in writing. Many of these copies can still be found today.

Judde never published any of his works during his lifetime; however, thanks to the transcriptions made by his students, many collections have been produced posthumously.

== Selected works ==
- Retraite spirituelle pour les personnes religieuses
- Réflexions chrétiennes sur les grandes vérités de la foi et sur les principaux mystères de la Passion de Notre Seigneur
- Exhortations sur les principaux devoirs de l'état religieux
- Œuvres spirituelles
  - includes Retraite spirituelle de trente jours
