= Pierre-René Floquet =

Pierre-René Floquet (September 12, 1716 – October 18, 1782) was a Jesuit priest in Quebec sympathetic to the Americans during the American Revolutionary War.

== Biography ==
He was born in Paris and entered the noviciate in 1734. Floquet taught grammar and the classics at Quimper and studied theology at the Jesuit Collège de La Flèche. He came to Canada in 1744, where he taught at the Jesuit college in Quebec. Floquet spent two years as a missionary at Kahnawake and took his vows as a priest in 1752. He served as bursar for the college at Quebec City until 1757, when he became superior for the Jesuits at Montreal. Although the Jesuit order was suppressed by Pope Clement XIV in 1773, the order continued to operate in Canada.

After Montreal was captured by the Americans in 1775, his interactions with the invading forces compromised him in the eyes of the British and of bishop Briand. Floquet allowed John Carroll, a Jesuit priest and the cousin of Charles Carroll, to perform mass in his church. He also had expressed opposition to the Quebec Act, had given the sacraments to people who had joined the American forces and had dined with American Colonel Moses Hazen. After being placed under an interdict by the bishop, Floquet expressed regret for not following the Briand's instructions to remain loyal to the British cause.

Floquet died in Quebec City at the age of 65.

== See also ==
- Catholic Church in Canada
