= Pedro Díaz (missionary) =

Spanish Roman Catholic missionary (1546–1618)

- Born: 1546; Lupedo, Spain
- Died: January 12, 1618 (aged 71–72); Mexico
- Occupation: Missionary

Pedro Díaz (1546 – 12 January 1618) was a Roman Catholic missionary.

== Biography ==
Díaz was born in Lupedo, Diocese of Toledo, Spain. At age twenty, he joined the Society of Jesus, and had already been a teacher of philosophy for two years. In 1572, he was sent by Saint Francis Borgia to Mexico with the first band of Jesuits assigned to that mission, and was the first master of novices in the Province of Mexico. As rector of the colleges of Guadalajara and Mexico, superior of the professed house, provincial, and founder of the colleges of Oaxaca and Guadalajara in Mexico and founder of Mérida in Mexico, and twice procurator to Rome, he occupies a prominent place in the early history of the Jesuits in Mexico. He died in Mexico.

He was also the first to start the mission work of his brethren among the Indians of New Spain. He wrote the Letteras de Missionibus per Indiam Occidentalem a Nostris de Societate Institutis per annos 1590 et 1591.
