= Michael Bordt =

German philosopher (born 1960)

Michael Bordt SJ
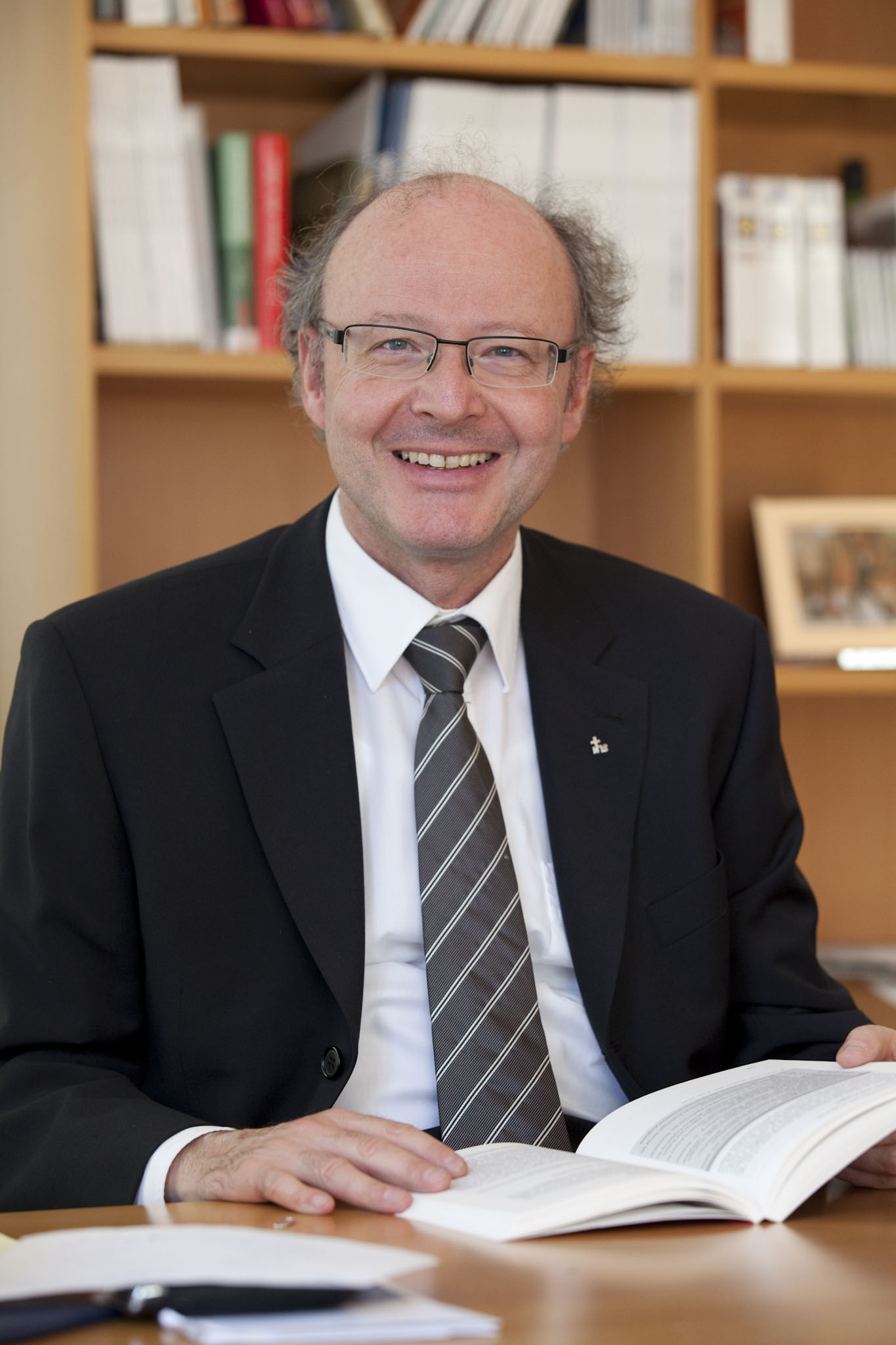
- Born: 28 April 1960 (age 66); Hamburg, West Germany
- Occupation: Professor at the Munich School of Philosophy

Academic background
- Education: Oxford University

Michael Bordt SJ (born 28 April 1960 in Hamburg) is a German philosopher and academic. He is a professor at the Munich School of Philosophy and specialized in the area of ancient philosophy, especially Plato and Aristotle. Since 2011 he has been the chair of the Institute of Philosophy and Leadership at Munich.

== Biography ==
After finishing his A-levels and civilian service, Michael Bordt studied Theology at Philosophy at Hamburg and Frankfurt and Munich from 1981 to 1988. His thesis dealt with the topic of the definition of being in Plato’s Sophist.

In 1993 he finished his studies in Theology in Munich and Frankfurt. In 1997 he received his PhD in Philosophy from Oxford University for a commentary on Plato’s Lysis supervised by Michael Frede. After founding the Aristotle circle in Munich in 1999, he was given a research fellowship at Princeton University in 2001 where he prepared for his habilitation, which he finished in 2004 at the University of Fribourg about Plato's Theology. Since 1997 Bordt has been working at the Munich School of Philosophy as a professor for ancient philosophy and philosophical Anthropology as well as aesthetics since 2004. From 2005 to 2011 he was the president of the Munich School of Philosophy. In 2011 he started the Institute for Philosophy and Leadership in Munich. During the 2013 summer term he is a visiting scholar at Columbia University, New York.

== Work ==
The philosophical concern of Bordt is to answer the existential questions arising from being human by using the concepts of analytical (especially Wittgenstein) and Ancient philosophy. Besides his function as a professor of philosophy he gives speeches and workshops for people in leading positions in economy, politics and the church about value-orientated leadership and leadership ethics. He also offers meditation courses and religious retreats.

== Bibliography ==
- Was uns wichtig ist oder warum die Wahrheit zählt. Gespräche mit Jesuiten über Gerechtigkeit, Verantwortung und Spiritualität (Hrsg.), München 2010
- Was in Krisen zählt, München 2009
- Platons Theologie, Freiburg 2006
- Aristoteleś Metaphysik XII. Übersetzung und Kommentar, Darmstadt 2006
- Platon, Herder-Spektrum, Reihe ‚Meisterdenker‘, Freiburg 1999 (Übersetzung ins Koreanische bei EHAK Publishing Co. [2003])
- Die christliche Antwort auf die existentiellen Fragen des Menschen. Zu Franz von Kutscheras neuer Studie Die großen Fragen - Philosophisch-theologische Gedanken, in: Theologie und Philosophie 77 (2002) 110-118.
- Platons Lysis, Übersetzung und Kommentar, in: Ernst Heitsch und Carl Werner Müller (Hrsg.) Platon Werke, Bd. V 4, Göttingen 1998 (= Diss.).
- Beweistheorie, Mathematik und Syllogistik. Zum Problem ihres Verhältnisses in Aristoteles? Zweiten Analytiken, in: Theologie und Philosophie 64 (1989) 23-53.
- Was ist der Mensch, München, Komplett-Media, 2011.
- Philosophische Anthropologie, München, Komplett-Media, 2011.
