= Álvarez de Paz =

Spanish Jesuit mystic

Álvarez de Paz (1560 – 17 January 1620) was a Spanish Jesuit mystic of the Society of Jesus, born in Toledo, Spain.

== Life ==
He joined the Society in 1578, and taught and wrote on theology and philosophy at Lima's Jesuit mission. Occasionally during his sermons, he fell into ecstasy and had to be carried from the pulpit. The fame of his sanctity was so great in South America, that, when he arrived, in a dying condition, at Potosí in Bolivia, the whole city came out to receive his blessing. Pope Francis made reference to him in a list of Jesuit priests associated with devotion to the Sacred Heart in his 2024 encyclical letter on this subject, Dilexit nos.

On the day of his death at Potosí, 100,000 men in the silver mines stopped work to assist at his funeral.

== Works ==
- De vita spirituali ejusque perfectione (1608)
- De exterminatione mali et promotione boni (1613)
- De inquisitione pacis, sive de studio orationis (1611)
