= William Detré =

William Detré was a Roman Catholic missionary, b. in France in 1668, d. in South America, at an advanced age, date uncertain.

== Biography ==
After his admission to the Society of Jesus, Detré was sent by his superiors to the missions of South America in 1706, and seven years later was appointed superior-general and visitor of all the missions of the Amazon, embracing a tract of over 3000 miles.

In 1727 he was appointed rector of the College of Cuenca.

== Works ==
He is credited with translating the Catechism into eighteen different languages for the various Indian tribes under his jurisdiction. It was he who sent to Europe the map of the Amazon drawn by Samuel Fritz, and engraved at Quito in 1707.

His 1731 "Relation", describing his experiences with the indigenous tribes of the area, is included in Volume XXIII of the Lettres Edifiantes.
