= Diego de Torres Bello =

Spanish-born Paraguayan Jesuit father

Diego de Torres Bollo (Villalpando, 1551-Chuquisaca Department, 1638) was a Jesuit father who created the first Jesuit missions in Paraguay.

He was in Castile and in 1581 traveled to Peru for the Society of Jesus. There he served in the Juli District and oversaw the Jesuit colleges in Cusco, Quito and Potosí. In 1604 he became the first provincial of the newly created province of Paraguay and Chile, based in Córdoba, Argentina, a position he held until 1615. He founded the first Jesuit reduction in 1609. He was fluent in the Aymara language, Guarani, and Quechua.

Argentine Jesuit historian Guillermo Furlong described Diego de Torres Bello in 1956 as "one of the most noted superiors which the Order has had in South America, director of almost all the colleges of Perú, founder and first provincial of the Jesuit provinces of the New Kingdom of Granada and Paraguay."
