= Père Louis Gaillard =

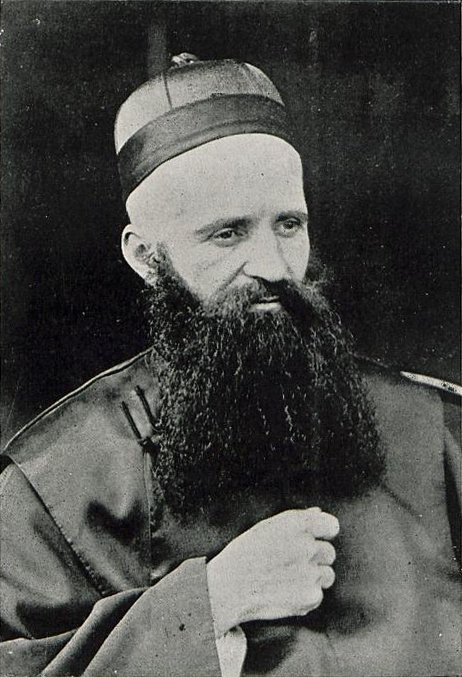
Louis Gaillard, probably in 1898

Père Louis Gaillard (1850–1900) was a 19th-century French sinologist and Jesuit missionary who studied notably Nankin, Shandong (Yantai), Guangdong (Pearl River) and more generally China.

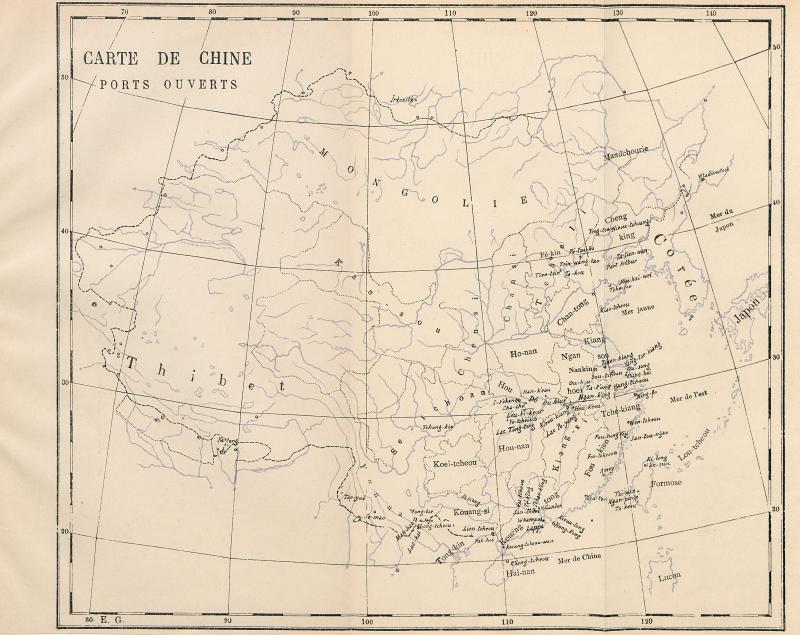
Map of open ports in China in 1898

== Bibliography ==
- Louis Gaillard (1889). Études d'art chinois : Le dessin en Chine. Nankin.
- Père Louis Gaillard (1901). Nankin d'alors et d'aujourd'hui. Variétés Sinologique. Vol. 18. Canghai: impr. de la Mission catholique.
- P. Louis Gaillard, S.J (1893). Croix et swastika en Chine. Chang-hai: Impr. de la mission catholique.
