= Wolfgang Feneberg =

German theologian (1935–2018)

- Born: 31 May 1935
- Died: 8 March 2018; Nuremberg
- Occupations: Theologian, university teacher, parson
- Employer: Munich School of Philosophy (1974–1990)

Wolfgang Feneberg (1935 – 8 March 2018) was a German Roman Catholic, later an Evangelical Lutheran theologian of the New Testament, ex-Jesuit and Parson of the Evangelical Lutheran Church in Bavaria and Professor. Feneberg was the founder of the "Bibelschule in Israel".

== Life ==
=== Education ===
After studying a philosophy and Catholic theology, Feneberg continued a doctorate in New Testament theology. He completed the Pedagogy degree Magister (Mag. Ped.).

=== Teaching ===
In 1977, Feneberg started as teacher of "Introduction and Exeges of the New Testament" in the Munich School of Philosophy, and worked after leaving the Jesuit order as a pastor in volunteering in the Evangelical Lutheran Church in Bavaria, continue in Bible Schools in the University of Erlangen-Nuremberg, the German University in Armenia (Professor of New Testament and Jewish Studies), and as Vice President and Speaker of the Academy of St. Paul.

=== Academic work ===
He has published on various themes of the New Testament theology and Ignatian Spirituality, and was active in providing accompanied retreats and spiritual direction.

== Works ==
=== Thesis ===
- Feneberg, Wolfgang (1974) [1969]. Der Markusprolog; Studien zur Formbestimmung des Evangeliums. Studien zum Alten und Neuen Testament. Vol. 36. München: Kösel-Verlag. ISBN 9783466253364. OCLC 1152014.
- ————————— (1977) [1969]. Der Markusprolog. Studien zur Formbestimmung des Evangeliums. Studien zum Alten und Neuen Testament. Vol. 36. München: Kösel-Verlag. ISBN 3-466-25336-5.

=== Books ===
- ————————— (1990). Jesus, der nahe Unbekannte. München: Kösel-Verlag. ISBN 9783466203178. OCLC 65388158.
- ————————— (1975). Arbeitsvorlagen zur religiösen Kindererziehung. Meitinger Kleinschriften. Vol. 40. Meitingen, Freising. ISBN 3-7838-0111-7.
- —————————; Feneberg, Rupert; Steiner, Josef (1979). Steiner, Josef (ed.). Die Messe mitfeiern. Wege, das Geheimnis neu zu erfahren (1980 2nd ed.). Basel, Wien: Freiburg im Breisgau. ISBN 3-451-18293-9.
- ————————— (1983). Sporschill, Georg (ed.). Du und wir. Jugendgebete. Zürich, Köln, Wien 1980. ISBN 3-545-29006-9. and ISBN 3-7008-0185-8
- —————————; Feneberg, Rupert (1980). Das Leben Jesu im Evangelium. Quaestiones disputatae. Vol. 88. Basel, Wien: Freiburg im Breisgau. ISBN 3-451-02088-2.
- —————————; Feneberg, Rupert; Steiner, Josef. Steiner, Josef (ed.). Gemeindekatechismus. Basel, Wien: Freiburg im Breisgau.
  - ————————; Feneberg, Rupert; Steiner, Josef (1981). Steiner, Josef (ed.). Wenn wir beten: Vater unser. Gemeindekatechismus. Vol. 1. Freiburg im Breisgau. ISBN 3-451-19428-7.
  - ————————; Feneberg, Rupert; Steiner, Josef (1983). Steiner, Josef (ed.). Wenn wir hören: Ich bin dein Gott. Das Zehnwort vom Sinai. Gemeindekatechismus. Vol. 2. Freiburg im Breisgau. ISBN 3-451-19610-7.
- —————————; Sporschill, Georg (1991) [1983]. Religiöse Jugendarbeit. Werkbuch für Gruppenleiter. Basel, Wien: Freiburg im Breisgau. ISBN 3-451-19666-2.
- ————————— (1991) [1990]. Jesus, der nahe Unbekannte. München. ISBN 3-466-20317-1.
- ————————— (1992). Paulus der Weltbürger. Eine Biographie. München. ISBN 3-466-20357-0.
- ————————— (1983). Informationszentrum im Dienste der Christlich-Jüdischen Verständigung (ed.). Das Neue Testament – Sprache der Liebe. Zum Problem des Antijudaismus. IDCIV-Vorträge. Wien.
- ————————— (2004). Mystik und Politik Jesu: ein Kommentar zu Johannes 1 - 12 im Gespräch der Religionen. Stuttgart: Verl. Kath. Bibelwerk. ISBN 9783460331679. OCLC 248794501.
- —————————; Sporschill, Georg; Mitterbauer, Peter (Foreword); Schoeller, Nora (Photos) (2006). Wie dem Adler wird dir die Jugend erneuert. Wege zum spirituellen Training. Wien. ISBN 978-3-8000-7275-0.
- —————————; Sporschill, Georg; Haselsteiner, Peter (Foreword); Schoeller, Nora (Photos) (2008). Du führst mich hinaus ins Weite. Wege zum spirituellen Training. Wien. ISBN 978-3-8000-7362-7.

=== Magazine and encyclopedia articles ===
- ————————— (1977). "Das Neue Testament als ökumenischer Helfer". Stimmen der Zeit. 195 (4): 278–280.
- ————————— (1979). "Jesus und die Gewalt. Die These Girards". Entschluß. Zeitschrift für Praxis und Theologie. 34 (4): 38.
- ————————— (1980). "Liebe zu Israel". Stimmen der Zeit. 198 (2): 136–137.
