= Bartolomé Pou =

Spanish priest and writer (1727–1802)

Bartolomé Pou (1727–1802) was a Spanish priest, writer and translator.

== Life ==
He was born on 21 June 1727 in Algaida, Majorca, and was educated by Jesuits, taking the novitiate at the age of nineteen. After teaching grammar for several years he was ordained as a priest in 1755.

After the Jesuits were expelled from Spain in 1767, he lived in Rome for 30 years, returning to Mallorca in 1797.

== Works ==
Bartholomew Pou published several books, some are named, others are with pseudonyms or anonymously declared. Highlights include:

- Entertainments rhetorical and poetic at the Academy of Cervera, three speeches and a tragedy entitled Hispania captures;
- the Bilbilitanae Theses, printed in 1763 in Calatayud with the title of philosophiae historiae Institutionum libri duodecim;
- Life of Venerable Berchmaus;
- apologetic four books of the Society of Jesus, written in Latin, with the name of Ignacio Philaretos;
- two books in memory of Laura Bassi, Latin and Greek, philosophy of the Academy of Bologna;
- the translation of the nine books of the History of Herodotus;
- Pastors Relief, Castilian, and a Compendium of Logic, two booklets, if not entirely his own, at least were corrected by him.
