= Fe y Alegría =

- Established: 1955; 71 years ago
- Headquarters: Calle 35 No. 21-19; Bogotá, Colombia
- Coordinates: 4°37′16″N 74°3′53″W
- Founder: José María Vélaz, SJ (1910–1985)
- Director: Daniel Villanueva, SJ
- Affiliations: Jesuit, Catholic
- Website: www.feyalegria.org/en/home-fya-international/

Fe y Alegría (English: Faith and Joy) is an international movement for the popular education, integral education and social promotion. Established in 1955, the federation offers educational programs to the poorest sectors of society, along with teacher training and educational radio. From its main office in Bogotá, Colombia, Fe y Alegría advances the tradition of Jesuit education under an international board of directors.

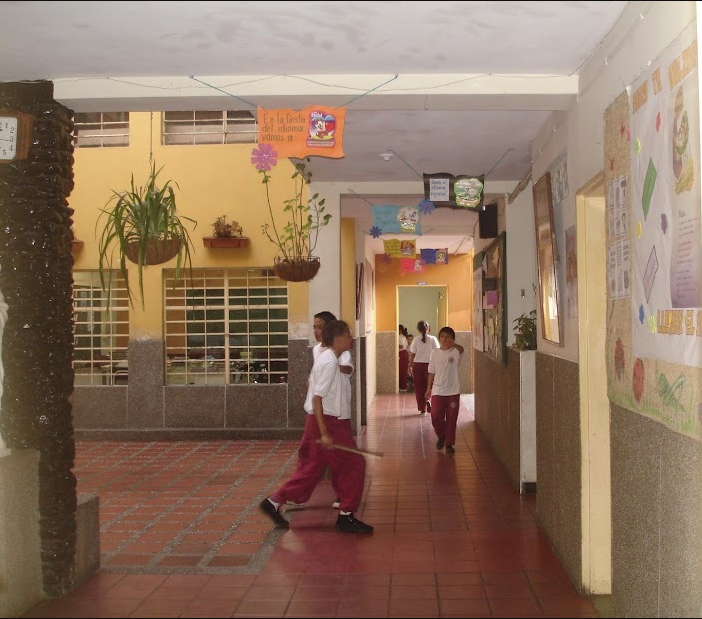
Photo of one of the Fe y Alegría schools at La Cima, Sección San José

== History ==
Fe y Alegría was founded in Caracas, Venezuela, in 1955 by José María Vélaz. He was born in Chile, where he spent his first ten years. That time deeply shaped his life with profound sensitivity of a Latin American. From an early age, he was educated in schools run by the Society of Jesus, where he continued his studies until becoming a Jesuit member. In 1946, he was sent to Venezuela, a country by then marked by inequality and illiteracy. Father Vélaz dreamed of establishing a network of schools in the most forgotten areas of the country. His motivation led him to seek allies among university students and, in 1960, he began working with communities. Volunteers would go with Faith (Fe) and return with Joy (Alegria), giving this educational initiative its name: Fe y Alegría.

The first Fe y Alegria school was opened in a working-class neighbourhood in western Caracas. This came about when José María Vélaz was looking for a place to launch this new initiative, in March 1955, and a couple, Abraham Reyes and Patricia García, offered their ranch as the first school. By 1976, Fe y Alegría expanded its network to Ecuador, Panama, Peru, Bolivia, El Salvador, Colombia, Nicaragua, and Guatemala.

The organization played a significant role during the government of Juan Velasco Alvarado in Peru during the 1960s. Father Luis Berger, the vicar of a parish, accompanied local leaders to meetings with the military government, and played a key role in mediation for social control.

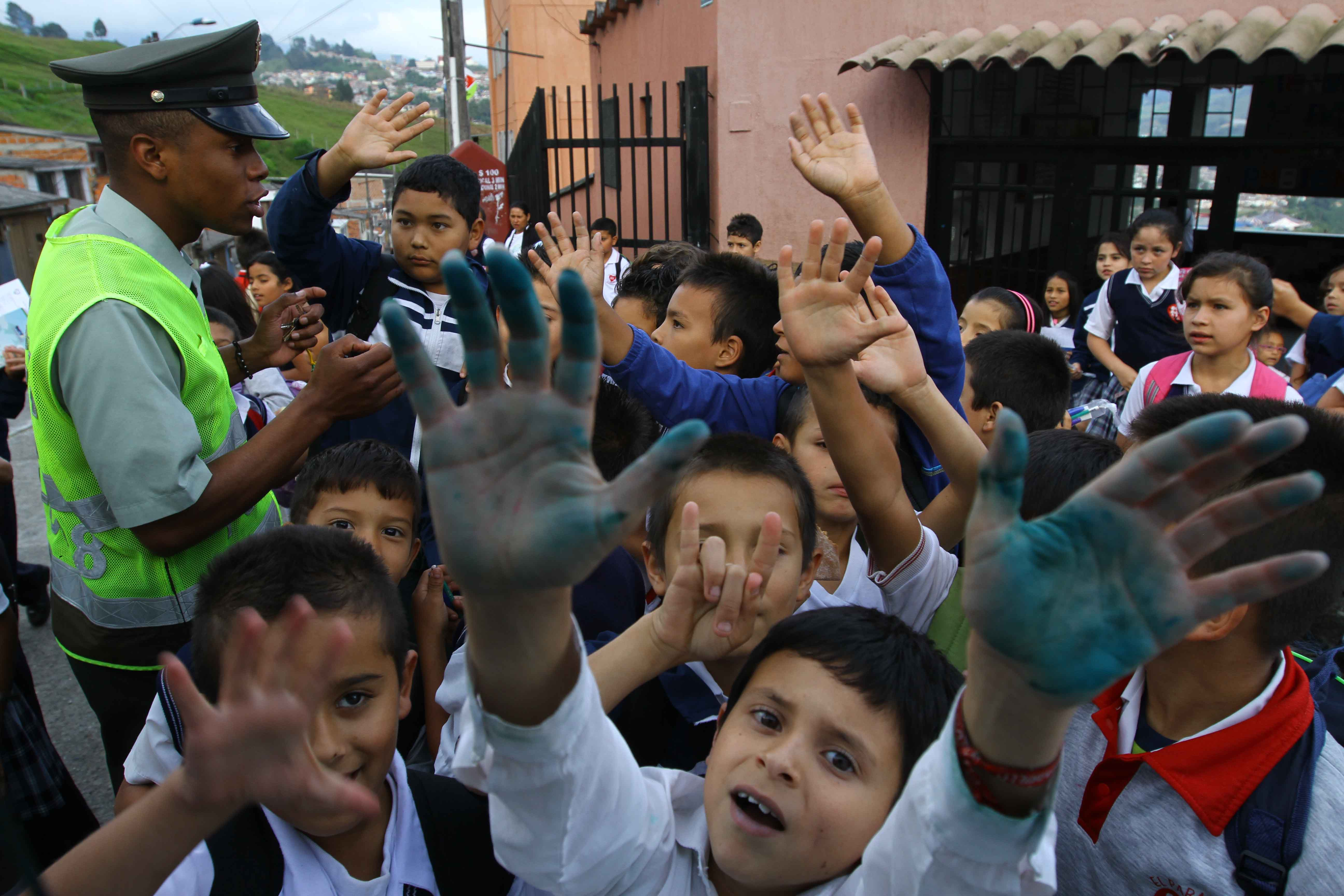
Students from Fe y Alegría School. Manizales, Colombia

In 1985 an office was established in Spain as a platform to support Latin American countries and promote the movement in Europe.

In 1999 its mission was redefined to take on development cooperation tasks, leading to the creation of the Entreculturas-Fe y Alegria Foundation.

In March 2025 Fe y Alegria celebrated its 70th anniversary with thanksgiving masses in various locations, announcing that "the celebration not only commemorates the past, but also looks to the future, reaffirming the movement's commitment to education and communication as essential tools for social change".

== Expansion into Europe ==
In 1962, their first branch in Europe was set up, in Pamplona, Spain, and it was then registered as an NGO in 1985.

In 2001 a branch was inaugurated in Rome, later expanding to Milan and Genoa.

== Global Plan of Federative Priorities 2021–2025 ==
Fe y Alegría published its global plan of federative priorities for the period 2021–2025 following the International Federation of Fe y Alegría - Bogotá in December 2020.

== Locations ==
As of 2025, Fe y Alegría operates within 22 countries and 3 continents.

Country	Year	Region
Argentina	1996	Latin America
Bolivia	1966	Latin America
Brazil	1981	Latin America
Democratic Republic of the Congo	2014	Africa
Chad	2007	Africa
Chile	2005	Latin America
Colombia	1971	Latin America
Dominican Republic	1990	Latin America
Ecuador	1964	Latin America
El Salvador	1969	Latin America
Guatemala	1976	Latin America
Haiti	2006	Latin America
Honduras	2000	Latin America
Italy	2001	Europe
Madagascar	2013	Africa
Nicaragua	1974	Latin America
Panama	1965	Latin America
Paraguay	1992	Latin America
Peru	1966	Latin America
Spain	1985	Europe
Uruguay	2008	Latin America
Venezuela	1955	Latin America
