= Nicolas-Ignace de Beaubois =

French missionary

Nicolas-Ignace de Beaubois (October 15, 1689 – January 13, 1770) was a French Jesuit priest and missionary who joined the Canadian mission in Quebec in 1719. In 1724, he became the superior of the Mississippi Valley colony and missions. In 1727, he settled in New Orleans. He returned to France in 1735, where he was an agent and fund-raiser for American missions, a minister, and an organizer of Jesuit spiritual retreats.

== Early life and career ==
Nicolas-Ignace de Beaubois was born at Orléans, France on October 15, 1689. On October 29, 1706, (Note: The Dictionary of Louisiana Biography states that he became a Jesuit on October 20, 1706.) Beaubois was admitted to the Society of Jesus (the Jesuits), and he made his noviciate in Paris. For two years he continued philosophical studies. Beginning in the fall of 1710, he taught boys in Rennes for three years and then taught a year at Alençon.

Seeking to be ordained, he studied theology at La Flèche and continued his studies one more year after he was ordained in 1717. In 1719, Beaubois was assigned to the Canadian mission and spent some time in Quebec. He was then stationed among the Illinois Native Americans beginning in 1721. At that time the mission was under the jurisdiction of French Louisiana, with its seat in New Orleans. Beaubois pronounced the four solemn vows of the professed Jesuit at Kaskaskia on February 2, 1723.

== Mississippi Valley missions ==
The Jesuit order designated the missions within the Mississippi valley as a distinct mission district within the Quebec diocese. Beaubois became the superior of the mission district in 1724.

Through his negotiations during a trip to France as well as with the Compagnie des Indes, he arranged for the establishment of the first girls' school in the Mississippi Valley, located in New Orleans and run by Ursuline nuns; funds for the Mississippi Valley missions' and a Jesuit house and a plantation near New Orleans. Beaubois arrived in New Orleans in March 1727 with Étienne de Périer, the new commander of the French Louisiana. Jesuits respected Beaubois's intelligence, but he lacked tact and was "too frank" according to Périer. He created friction with the Capachins, including its pastor Raphaël de Luxembourg, who had established themselves in New Orleans before the Jesuits.

In 1727, Beaubois was named vicar general by Jean-Baptiste de La Croix de Chevrières de Saint-Vallier of Quebec, but due to controversies with Capuchins about his areas of responsibility and dominion, he returned to France, arriving in July 1728. He was reinstated in March 1732, but he was recalled by his Jesuit superiors in or after 1734.

== France ==
In 1735, Beaubois sailed back to France and lived in Bourges at the Jesuit college, where he was a fundraiser and agent for the American missions. He organized retreats based upon Ignatius of Loyola's spiritual exercises beginning in 1743 at the college of Amiens and then at the college at Vannes from 1751 until 1762, when Jesuits were suppressed in France.

Beaubois died near Avignon, France on January 13, 1770.

== Legacy ==
Although controversial, Beaubois improved management of Mississippi Valley colony and missions, he:

- established the first permanent Jesuit residence in New Orleans as a way station for Jesuit missionaries
- promoted developing relationships with Native Americans
- promoted revenue-producing sugar cane and indigo plantations for missions
- stressed the strategic importance of the Ohio River as English settlers moved west
- was instrumental in gaining royal approval for digging a canal from the edge of New Orleans to Rivière d'Orléans (Bayou St. John), which was accomplished under the Spanish regime

Beaubois Street in the Neufchâtel East–Lebourgneuf sections of Les Rivières, Quebec is named for him.
