= Joseph M. Finotti =

Joseph M. Finotti (21 September 1817 – 10 January 1879) was an Italian Jesuit, writer and editor, active in the United States.

== Life ==
Finotti was born in Ferrara, Italy. In 1833 he was received into the Society of Jesus in Rome, and for several years taught and studied in the colleges of the order in Italy. He was one of the recruits whom James A. Ryder, in 1845, brought from Europe to work in the Maryland Province.

In 1847, Finotti served a brief term as the librarian at Georgetown University Library, compiling its first catalog.

After his ordination at Georgetown, D.C., Finotti was appointed pastor of St. Mary's Church, Alexandria, Virginia, and given charge of outlying missions in Maryland and Virginia. In 1852 he left the Society of Jesus and went to Boston. He became pastor of Brookline and later of Arlington, Massachusetts.

Beginning in 1852, Finotti was a staff member for The Pilot, and after the 1858 death of John R. Roddan he became literary editor.

The last few years of his life he spent in the West, becoming, in 1877, pastor of Central City, Colorado, and retaining charge of that parish up to the time of his death.

== Works ==
Among his literary productions are:

- "Month of Mary", 1853, which reached a sale of 50,000 copies;
- "Life of Blessed Paul of the Cross", 1860;
- "Diary of a Soldier", 1861;
- "The French Zouave", 1863;
- "Herman the Pianist", 1863;
- "Works of the Rev. Arthur O'Leary";
- "Life of Blessed Peter Claver", etc.

Most of these publications were translated or edited by him.

His best-known work, never completed, is his Bibliographica Catholica Americana, which took years of compilation. It was intended to be a catalogue of all the Catholic books published in the United States, with notices of their authors, and epitomes of their contents. The first part, which brings the list down to 1820 inclusive, was published in 1872; the second volume, which was to include the works of Catholic writers from 1821 to 1875, was never finished, though much of the material for it had been gathered.

His last literary effort, which he did not live to see published, entitled "The Mystery of the Wizard Clip" (Baltimore, 1879), is a story of preternatural occurrences at Smithfield, West Virginia, involving Demetrius Augustine Gallitzin.
