= Balthazar Francolini =

Attritionist theologian

Balthazar Francolini (1650–1709) was a Jesuit theologian. He was born in Fermo and became a professor of philosophy at the Gregorian University in Rome. He was an attritionist, holding that imperfect contrition (attritio) was sufficient to receive the sacrament. He opposed the more rigorous heresy of Jansenism, writing Clericus Romanus Contra Nimium Rigorismum Munitus in 1707.
