= Girolamo Francesco Tornielli =

Catholic priest and author (1693–1752)

- Born: 1693; Cameri, Italy
- Died: 1752 (aged 58–59)
- Occupations: Preacher, writer
- Known for: Poetic preaching; Sette canzonette in aria marinaresca, sopra le sette principali feste di nostra Signora

Francesco Tornielli (1693–1752) was an Italian Jesuit, preacher, and writer.

== Life and career ==
He was born in Cameri. Known for his poetic preaching, he also enjoyed singing and wrote Sette canzonette in aria marinaresca, sopra le sette principali feste di nostra Signora (Milan, 1738, octavo and Modena, 1818, 16avo). Also among his published works are Prediche quaresimali (Milan, 1753, quarto) and Bassano, 1820, quarto; and Panegirici e discosi sacri (Milan, 1767, octavo and Bassano, 1822, octavo). His eulogy by Loya was published in Piemontesi illustri.
