= Lawrence Sydney Nicasio =

Belizean Roman Catholic bishop (1956–2024)

The Most Reverend Lawrence Sydney Nicasio
- Bishop of Belize City & Belmopan
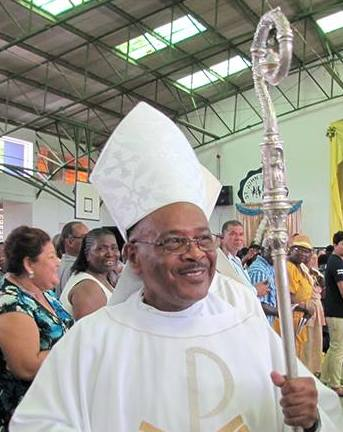
- Nicasio in 2017
- Church: Roman Catholic
- Province: Kingston in Jamaica
- Diocese: Belize City & Belmopan
- Appointed: 26 January 2017
- Installed: 13 May 2017
- Term ended: 1 January 2024
- Predecessor: Dorick M. Wright
- Successor: Vacant

Orders
- Ordination: 16 June 1989 by Osmond Peter Martin
- Consecration: 13 May 2017 by Léon Kalenga Badikebele, Patrick Christopher Pinder, Fernand J. Cheri

Personal details
- Born: 5 September 1956 Dangriga, British Honduras (now Belize)
- Died: 1 January 2024 (aged 67) Belize City, Belize
- Education: Belize Teachers' College; Cardinal Glennon College
- Motto: Sollicitum ambulare cum Deo

Lawrence Sydney Nicasio (5 September 1956 – 1 January 2024) was a Belizean clergyman and Roman Catholic bishop in the Roman Catholic Diocese of Belize City-Belmopan.

== Biography ==
Lawrence Sydney Nicasio was born on 5 September 1956, and came from a Garifuna family. He attended Augustine High School in his hometown of Dangriga and graduated from Belize Teachers' College in Belize City. He then taught at various schools and was appointed director of the Catholic schools in the Toledo District.

In 1981 he began studying philosophy at Cardinal Glennon College in Shrewsbury, Missouri, which was followed by studies at the theology college on the same grounds, Kenrick Theological Seminary, near St. Louis. On 16 June 1989, he was ordained to the priesthood. He was Vicar in Belmopan for 13 years from 1991 to 2004, pastor in Orange Walk Town, and then pastor of two suburban churches in Belize City: St. Ignatius (2005–2008) and St. John Vianney (2008–2013).

On 26 January 2017, Pope Francis accepted the resignation of Bishop Dorick M. Wright and appointed Nicasio as the new Bishop of Belize City-Belmopan. He received episcopal consecration from the Apostolic Nuncio in Belize, Archbishop Léon Kalenga Badikebele, on 13 May 2017. Co-consecrators were the Archbishop of Nassau, Patrick Christopher Pinder, and Fernand J. Cheri, OFM, Auxiliary Bishop in New Orleans.

Nicasio died from cancer at his residence in Belize City, on 1 January 2024, at the age of 67.

Catholic Church titles
Preceded by Dorick M. Wright	Bishop of Belize City & Belmopan; 2017–2024	Succeeded by Vacant
