= Diocese of Belize =

There have been two Christian dioceses named after the country of Belize. They are :

- the Anglican Diocese of Belize
- the Roman Catholic Diocese of Belize City-Belmopan, formerly the Roman Catholic Diocese of Belize
