= Joseph Anthony Murphy =

The Most Reverend Joseph A. Murphy, S.J.
- Vicar Apostolic of Belize
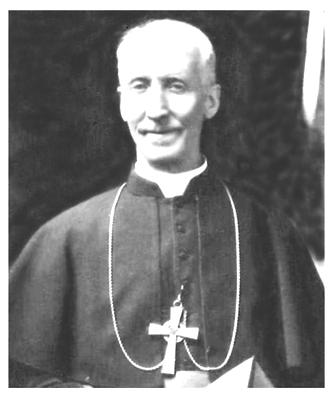
- Church: Catholic Church
- See: Titular Bishop of Birtha
- Appointed: December 23, 1923
- In office: May 4, 1924 – July 16, 1938
- Predecessor: Frederick C. Hopkins, S.J.
- Successor: William A. Rice, S.J.
- Previous posts: Dean of College of Arts and Science, Marquette University

Orders
- Ordination: August 26, 1888
- Consecration: March 19, 1924 by Archbishop John J. Glennon

Personal details
- Born: December 24, 1857 Dundalk, County Louth, Ireland
- Died: November 25, 1939 (aged 81) Milwaukee, Wisconsin, United States

Joseph Anthony Murphy was born in Ireland but raised in Chicago. He became a Jesuit priest and served, inter alia, as dean of the liberal arts college at Marquette University for eleven years and as Vicar Apostolic for the Catholic mission in British Honduras (Belize), Central America, being ordained bishop on March 19, 1924.

== Early life and work ==
Joseph Anthony Murphy was born in Dundalk County Louth, Ireland, December 24, 1857. He lost his mother at a young age and his father moved the family of three boys and seven girls to Chicago, where Joseph attended St. Ignatius College Prep and then entered the Society of Jesus (Jesuits) at St. Stanislaus Novitiate in Florissant, Missouri. His priestly studies were at Woodstock College, Maryland, where he was ordained a priest on August 26, 1888. He then served at Detroit College as Prefect of Studies (1895–1905) and on the mission in British Honduras from 1905 until 1910 when he suffered a severe attack of tropical fever.

== College dean and bishop ==
He returned to the States to become dean of the liberal arts college of Marquette University (1910–1921) and then for two years professor of philosophy at St. Louis University. He had been requesting reassignment to the Jesuit mission and it came in the form of his appointment, at age 66, as Vicar Apostolic for British Honduras. He was consecrated bishop by Archbishop Glennon in St. Louis, Missouri, on March 19, 1924. He would preside from Holy Redeemer, the mother church in Belize with its cathedral dating back to 1858. His episcopacy would be marked by construction projects like that of Holy Redeemer Hall, the largest in Belize at the time, as well as by reconstruction after the 1931 Belize hurricane, a category 4 that killed approximately 2500 people.

== Irish Catholic ==
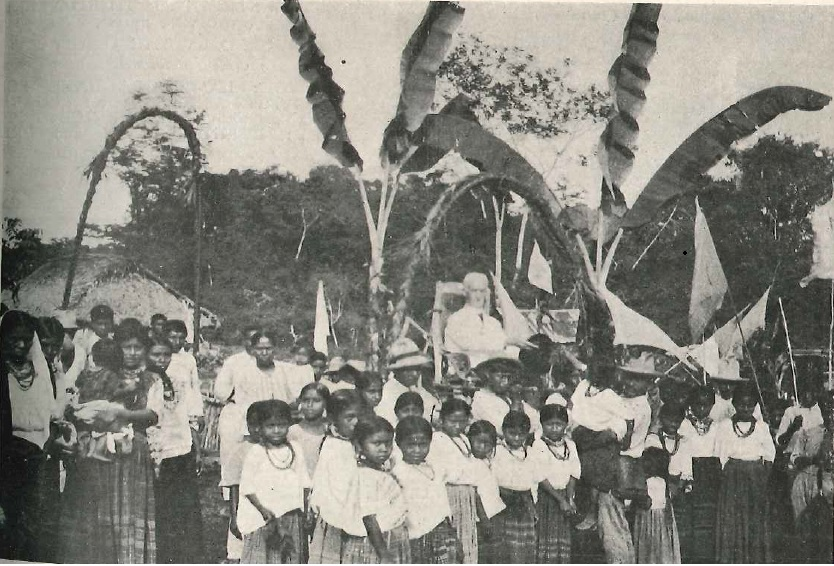
Murphy carried into Maya village

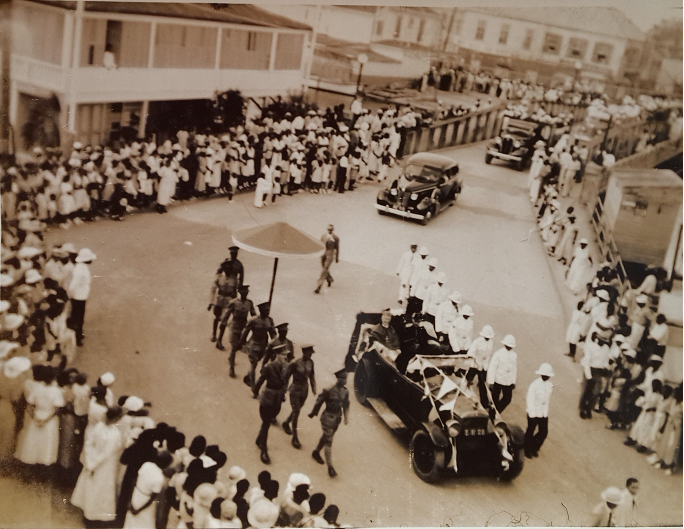
Murphy Jubilee parade in Belize

Born just at the edge of Catholic Ireland, Murphy's zeal for Catholicism was deeply rooted in Irish Catholicism and Irish-English relations. He refused to stand for the British National Anthem at public ceremonies, or to receive the Anglican bishop for a visit. Murphy seemed to relish the ceremonial of his office. He made a regal entry into Keckchi villages, carried on a chair on the shoulders of the Maya with palm leaves and banners waving around him. For his fiftieth jubilee as a priest Belize Town gave him a regal parade. Cardiac asthma brought on his resignation at the age of 80. He died in his sleep on November 25, 1939, in Milwaukee.
