= David Francis Hickey =

Catholic bishop

The Most Reverend David F. Hickey
- Bishop of Belize
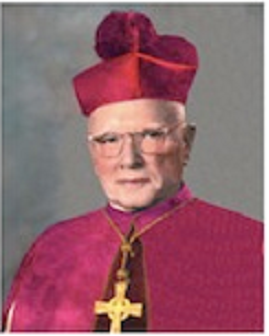
- Church: Catholic Church
- Appointed: February 29, 1956
- Term ended: July 13, 1957
- Successor: Robert Louis Hodapp, S.J.
- Previous post: Vicar Apostolic of Belize (1948-1956)

Orders
- Ordination: June 27, 1917
- Consecration: September 21, 1948 by Joseph Ritter

Personal details
- Born: December 3, 1882 St. Louis, Missouri
- Died: August 24, 1973 (aged 90)

David Francis Hickey, S.J. (December 3, 1882 – August 24, 1973) was an American-born bishop of the Catholic Church. He served as the Vicar Apostolic and then the first Bishop of Belize, from 1948 to 1957.

== Early life ==
Born in St. Louis, Missouri, on December 3, 1882, David Hickey was ordained a priest for the Society of Jesus (Jesuits) on June 27, 1917. He came to the Belize mission in 1926 and served as principal at St. John’s College, pastor of the Cathedral, Jesuit superior, and vicar general. While Jesuit superior he fostered group action to attain economic security through education and Catholic social action. He attended the first Mission Institute in St. Louis that offered an intensive study of credit unions, cooperatives, and rural life programs. As Mission superior he encouraged Frs. Marion M. Ganey and Henry Sutti in their foundational work with credit unions and cooperatives in Belize.

== Titular bishop ==
On June 10, 1948, Pope Pius XII appointed Hickey as Titular Bishop of Bonitza and Vicar Apostolic of Belize (British Honduras). He was consecrated a bishop by Archbishop Joseph Ritter on September 21, 1948, with principal co-consecrators William McCarty of Rapid City and Edward Daly of Des Moines. Hickey presided over a vicariate where, in 1949, 35,263 of 59,220 inhabitants (60%) were Catholic. There were 9 parishes and 109 mission stations, 28 priests of which 24 were Jesuits, and 96 religious Sisters. Sixty-three schools run by the Catholic church had a total of 7,039 students. Besides the usual circuit of confirming the faithful and the construction of churches and schools, he fostered the spread of the credit union and cooperative movement which became an ecumenical venture in Belize and beyond. In the Holy Year 1950 Hickey encouraged Crusades of Prayer that injected new life into “the cooperative movement, the St. Vincent de Paul Society, the Boy Scouts, and into the various educational activities.”

== Diocese ==
Bishop Hickey saw toward the end of his episcopacy the raising of Belize from vicariate status to that of a diocese. It would no longer be a mission church under patronage of the Congregation for the Evangelization of Peoples but became a diocese with its own bishop. For the occasion of Hickey’s installation as first Bishop of Belize on February 29, 1956, papal nuncio Archbishop Luigi Raimondi visited Belize. The following year, at seventy-four, Hickey submitted his resignation and it was accepted effective July 13, 1957. On March 13, 1958, Robert Louis Hodapp, SJ, was named his successor and second Bishop of Belize.

Catholic Church titles
Preceded by William A. Rice, S.J.	Vicar Apostolic of Belize; 1948–1956	Succeeded by Vicariate elevated to a diocese
