= Paul Leonard Hagarty =

Catholic bishop

Paul Leonard Hagarty O.S.B O.B.E.
- Bishop of Nassau
- Church: Catholic Church
- Diocese: Diocese of Nassau
- In office: June 25, 1950 – July 17, 1981
- Predecessor: John Bernard Kevenhoerster
- Successor: Lawrence Aloysius Burke
- Previous post: Titular Bishop of Arba (1950-1960)

Orders
- Ordination: June 6, 1936
- Consecration: October 19, 1950 by Amleto Giovanni Cicognani

Personal details
- Born: March 20, 1909 Greene, Iowa, United States
- Died: September 22, 1984 (aged 75) Collegeville, Minnesota, United States

Paul Leonard Hagarty, O.S.B., O.B.E. (March 20, 1909 – September 22, 1984) was an American prelate of the Catholic Church. He was the first Bishop of Nassau (1960–81), having previously served as Vicar Apostolic of the Bahama Islands (1950–60).

== Early life and education ==
Hagarty was born in Greene, Iowa, one of ten children of James Herbert and Lucy Belle (née O'Connell) Hagarty. He attended Oakland School No. 8 and Sacred Heart Academy before entering Greene Catholic High School. He then studied at Loras College in Dubuque, where he paid for his first year with the compensation he received from a railroad accident in which he suffered a broken leg. He paid the rest of his way through college with a Saturday job at J. C. Penney, and graduated with a Bachelor of Arts degree in 1930.

== Ministry ==
He worked as a geologist for the Union Pacific Railroad, as well as a junior meteorologist with the National Weather Service, before joining the Order of St. Benedict, more commonly known as the Benedictines, at St. John's Abbey in Collegeville, Minnesota, in 1931. He made his profession as a Benedictine monk on November 6, 1932, taking the name Leonard. He was ordained to the priesthood on June 6, 1936.

In 1937, Hagarty was sent by his superiors to serve as a missionary to the Bahama Islands, a British colony, where he served as a curate at St. Francis Xavier Church in Nassau for five years. In addition to his pastoral work, he was also a chaplain for the local leper colony, Goodwill Orphanage, and the general hospital.

During World War II, he served as an auxiliary chaplain to British and American troops in the Bahamas. He developed a close relationship with Bishop John Kevenhoerster, who brought Hagarty with him on his collecting tours and later sent him to the University of Oxford for postgraduate studies. He became director of education following his return, reforming the Catholic school system.

On June 25, 1950, Hagarty was appointed Vicar Apostolic of the Bahama Islands and Titular Bishop of Arba by Pope Pius XII. He received his episcopal consecration on the following October 19 from Archbishop Amleto Cicognani at the Church of Our Lady of the Holy Souls in Nassau. The apostolic vicariate was elevated to the Diocese of Nassau by Pope John XXIII on July 5, 1960, with Hagarty becoming its first Bishop.

During his tenure, he greatly expanded Catholic participation in education and social development. He attended the Second Vatican Council from 1962 to 1965. In February 1979, he hosted Pope John Paul II during his visit to Nassau. He was also named an Officer of The Order of The British Empire by Queen Elizabeth II.

== Later life and death ==
Hagarty resigned as bishop on July 17, 1981 due to poor health. He later died at St. John's Abbey at age 75, and is entombed at St. Francis Xavier Cathedral in Nassau.

== See also ==
Catholic Church titles
Preceded by none	Bishop of Nassau; 1960–1981	Succeeded by Lawrence Aloysius Burke
