= Robert Louis Hodapp =

Catholic bishop

The Most Reverend Robert L. Hodapp, S.J.
- Bishop of Belize
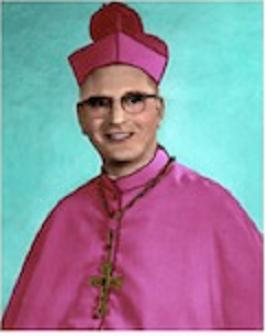
- Church: Catholic Church
- Appointed: March 2, 1958
- In office: June 26, 1958 – November 11, 1983
- Predecessor: David Francis Hickey, S.J.
- Successor: Osmond P. Martin

Orders
- Ordination: June 18, 1941
- Consecration: June 26, 1958 by Patrick Finbar Ryan, O.P.

Personal details
- Born: October 1, 1910 Mankato, Minnesota
- Died: October 26, 1989 (aged 79)

Robert Louis Hodapp, S.J. (October 1, 1910 – October 26, 1989) was an American-born bishop of the Catholic Church. He served as the second Bishop of Belize from 1958-1983.

== Early life ==
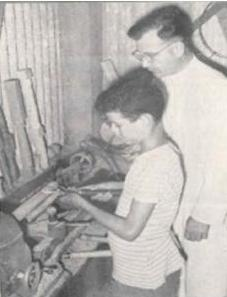

Robert Hodapp was born in Mankato, Minnesota, to George J. and Elizabeth M. (Schmidt) Hodapp. He was educated at Loyola High School in Mankato, St. Stanislaus Seminary in Florissant, Missouri, Saint Louis University, and St. Mary's College in Kansas.

He professed vows in the Society of Jesus (Jesuits) in 1930 and was ordained a priest on June 18, 1941. In 1942 he arrived on the Belize mission where he taught at St. John's College, did pastoral work at Holy Redeemer Cathedral parish, and became over-all superintendent of construction for the mission.

== Episcopacy ==
On March 2, 1958 Pope Pius XII appointed him as the Bishop of Belize (British Honduras). He was consecrated by Archbishop Patrick F. Ryan, O.P., of Port of Spain on June 26, 1958. The principal co-consecrators were Bishops Edward A. Fitzgerald of Winona and John J. McEleney, S.J., of Kingston in Jamaica. Hodapp was the sixth bishop to serve in Belize and the second since it became a diocese. He was most unassuming, with little of the episcopal aura of the previous bishops and, with earthy simplicity, was perhaps the first bishop in Belize who seemed adapted to mission life from the moment he arrived in the country. He took right to his pastoral duties and Confirmation tours: "Bishop Hodapp travels by jeep, horseback, canoe (dory), boat, airplane, and on foot to reach the many people he administers Confirmation to each year." He took a strong stand against the introduction of casinos and organized gambling into Belize. "When Bishop Hodapp was shot in New Orleans … there was some speculation that it was because he opposed the casino package." In 1959 he had begun turning over parishes to diocesan priests. By 1972 diocesan priests were running 6 parishes. In 1969 he named Fr. Facundo Castillo the first Belizean pastor of the cathedral parish and vicar general of the diocese. In 1971 St. Ignatius parish covered the entire area west of downtown and south of Haulover Creek. Hodapp instituted St. Martin de Porres parish for the western part of this area. In 2015 St. Martin's and St. Peter Claver in Punta Gorda were the two parishes in Belize still pastored by Jesuits.

== Laity and religious ==
Hodapp attended all four sessions of the Second Vatican Council. In line with the Council's decree on the laity, he strove to activate the laity in the church. He had orchestrated the country's first national gathering of lay ministers, on 9–11 March 1984 bringing together 255 lay ministers and catechists, including 39 Maya. During Hodapp's episcopacy five more groups of religious arrived in Belize. The Society of Our Lady of the Most Holy Trinity (SOLT) came in 1967 and have increased their presence ever since, focusing mainly on the communications apostolates. In 1969, the abbot and procurator of the Benedictine monastery in Subiaco, Arkansas, paid a visit to study the viability of establishing a monastery in Belize. In 1971 they opened Santa Familia Monastery near Santa Elena in the Cayo District. Then in 1975 the first Sisters of Charity of Nazareth came to Belize, focusing on health ministry and adult faith formation. Next the Missionaries of Our Lady of the Light, "Madrecitas," began their ministry in the remote villages of northern Belize. Finally, Guadalupana Sisters from Yucatan served primarily in lay ministry in St. Francis Xavier Parish, Corozal Town, in the 1970s until 1989. In March 1983 Pope John Paul II visited all the countries of Central America, including Belize. Hodapp's episcopacy covered more than 25 years until November 11, 1983, when the Pope accepted his resignation. He died at the age of 79 on October 26, 1989.

Catholic Church titles
| Preceded by David Francis Hickey | Bishop of Belize; 1958–1983 | Succeeded by Osmond P. Martin |
