= Dorick M. Wright =

Belizean Roman Catholic priest (1945–2020)

The Most Reverend Dorick M. Wright
- Bishop of Belize City-Belmopan
- Church: Catholic Church
- See: Titular Bishop of Thimida Regia
- Appointed: 18 November 2006
- In office: 23 January 2007 –26 January 2017
- Predecessor: Osmond P. Martin

Orders
- Ordination: 27 June 1975
- Consecration: 4 April 2002 by Bishop Osmond P. Martin
- Rank: Auxiliary Bishop of Belize

Personal details
- Born: Dorick McGowan Wright; November 15, 1945 Belize City, British Honduras (now Belize)
- Died: April 15, 2020 (aged 74)

Dorick McGowan Wright (November 15, 1945 – April 15, 2020) was a Belizean prelate. From 2006 to 2017, he has served as the fourth bishop of the Catholic Church for the Roman Catholic Diocese of Belize City-Belmopan. Pope Francis accepted his resignation on 26 January 2017 and appointed Fr. Lawrence Sydney Nicasio as the new bishop.

== Early life ==
Wright grew up in the Holy Redeemer Cathedral parish in what was then British Honduras. His first cousin was Anglican bishop Philip Wright and his uncle was Pastor Lloyd Wright from Bethel Assembly of God Church. In 1961, while in his mid-teens, he lost his mother, two sisters, and a brother in hurricane Hattie. The tree image on Bishop Wright's coat of arms is symbolic of the mango tree that saved his life. He attended St. John's College and then taught for three years at Holy Redeemer Primary School. He then entered Conception Seminary, run by the Order of St. Benedict in north-west Missouri, where he completed his education for the priesthood.

== Episcopacy ==
Wright was ordained at Holy Redeemer Cathedral, Belize City, on June 27, 1975. He then assisted at St. Joseph Parish, Holy Redeemer Cathedral parish, and Inmaculada Parish in Orange Walk. He returned to St. Joseph Parish as pastor and then to Holy Redeemer Cathedral. On April 4, 2002, Wright was consecrated at St. John's College as Auxiliary to Bishop Osmond P. Martin, with Martin the principal consecrator. He was appointed bishop of the diocese on November 18, 2006, and installed on January 23, 2007, with Archbishop Luigi Pezzuto, nuncio for Belize and El Salvador, presiding.

Bishop Wright founded St. Benedict Diocesan Seminary, a minor seminary offering two years of college training to those studying for the priesthood. It opened on August 27, 2013, on the grounds of the former Santa Familia Benedictine Monastery outside Santa Elena, Belize. Four young men comprised its first class.

Wright outspokenly opposed efforts to decriminalize homosexual activity in Belize. His position was supported by the Belize Evangelical Council, and later also by the Belize Council of Churches that included the Roman Catholic Church in Belize as a member. With Bishop Wright's eyesight failing, he requested help to carry out his mission and in 2012 Viatorian Fr. Christopher Glancy was consecrated Auxiliary Bishop and Vicar General for the Diocese of Belize City-Belmopan.
