= Christopher Glancy =

Most Reverend Christopher John Glancy, C.S.V.
- Auxiliary Bishop Emeritus of Belize City-Belmopan
- See: Titular Bishop of Absa Salla
- Appointed: February 18, 2012

Orders
- Ordination: April 17, 1993
- Consecration: May 5, 2012 by Luigi Pezzuto

Personal details
- Born: April 10, 1960 (age 66) Moline, Illinois, USA

Christopher John Glancy, C.S.V. (born April 10, 1960) is an American-born bishop of the Catholic Church in Belize. He has been the auxiliary bishop of the Diocese of Belize City–Belmopan from 2012 until 2024.

== Early life and education ==
Christopher John Glancy was born in Moline, Illinois. He was educated at Alleman High School in Rock Island, Illinois, and earned a bachelor's degree in sociology from Loyola University of Chicago. He professed religious vows in the Clerics of St. Viator, also known as the Viatorians, on July 16, 1983. He taught at the Colegio San Viator in Bogota, Colombia, for four years. Glancy made his perpetual profession on July 13, 1986. He earned a master of divinity degree, specializing in the theology of missions, from Catholic Theological Union in Chicago.

== Priesthood ==
Glancy was ordained a priest on April 17, 1993. His first assignment as a priest was as parochial vicar at Maternity of the Blessed Virgin Mary Parish in Bourbonnais, Illinois. He served as vocation director and as a member of the provincial council of the Viatorians. He was missioned to Belize in 1998, where he served as parochial vicar at St. Francis Xavier Parish in Corozal. The parish has 23 village missions, 19 primary schools, and Chunox St. Viator Vocational High School. He later returned to the United States where he served as parochial vicar at St. Viator Parish in Chicago.

== Episcopacy ==
Pope Benedict XVI named Glancy the Titular Bishop of Absa Salla and Auxiliary Bishop of Belize City-Belmopan on February 18, 2012. He was ordained a bishop by Archbishop Luigi Pezzuto, the Apostolic Nuncio to Belize and the Antilles on May 5, 2012. The principal co-consecrators were Bishops Dorick M. Wright of Belize City-Belmopan and Jacques Berthelet, C.S.V. of Saint-Jean-Longueuil. The Auxiliary Bishop works out of the cathedral parish in Belize City.

He resigned as auxiliary bishop on 13 March 2024.
