= St. Francis Xavier Cathedral, Nassau =

St. Francis Xavier Cathedral
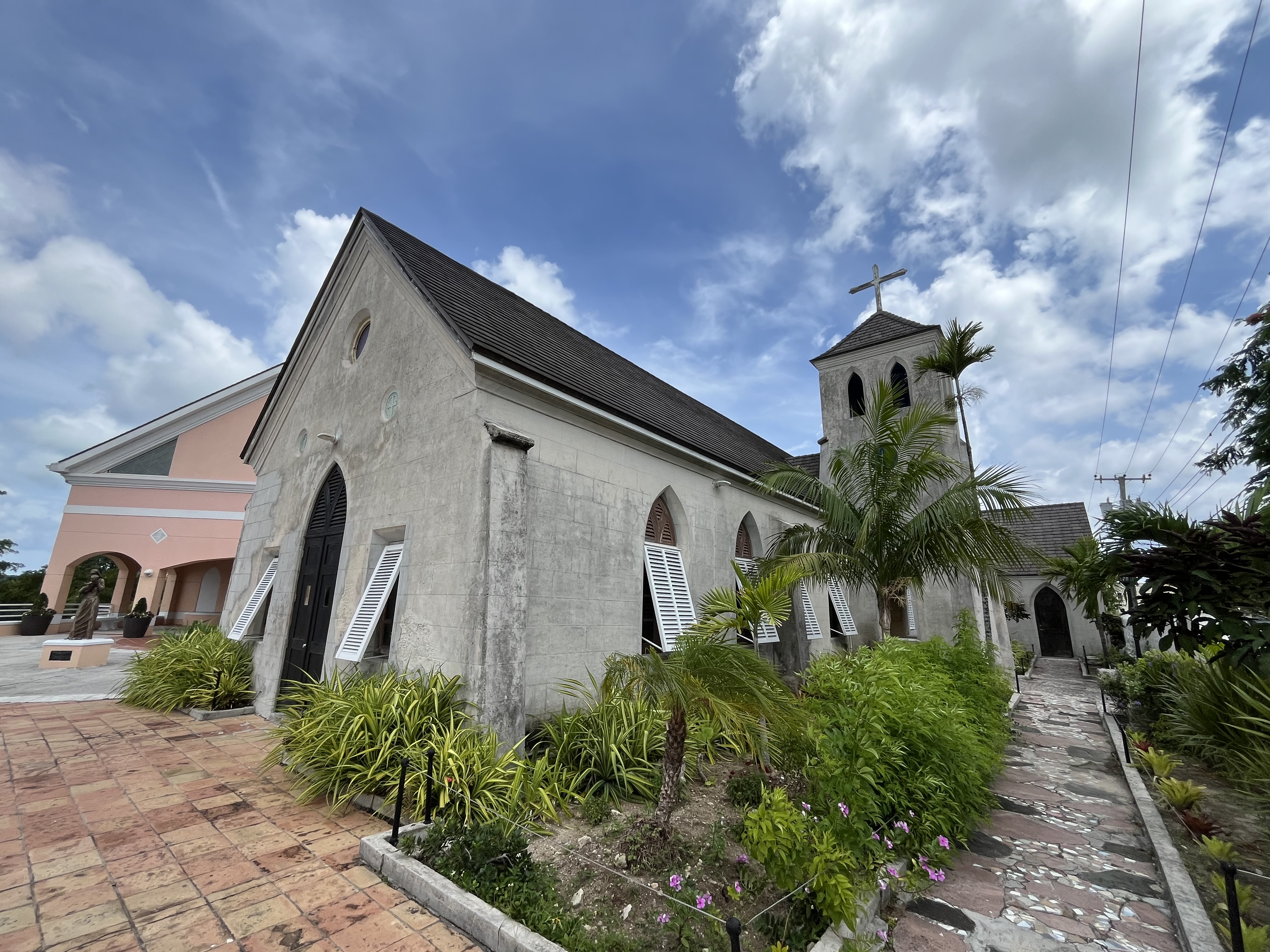

- Location within Bahamas
- 25°04′33.2″N 77°20′53.3″W
- Location: Nassau
- Country: Bahamas
- Denomination: Roman Catholic

The Cathedral of St. Francis Xavier is a parish of the Roman Catholic Church in Nassau, Bahamas. It is the seat of the Metropolitan Archdiocese of Nassau. and mother church of The Bahamas.

The cathedral church is located in West Street near the National Art Gallery of The Bahamas.

Its patron is St. Francis Xavier, a Spanish missionary, a member of the precursor group of the Society of Jesus and close associate of its founder, Ignatius of Loyola.

== History ==
From 1866, the Catholic community in The Bahamas was placed under the Diocese of Charleston, in the U.S. Petitions were made for a permanent parish priest to be assigned to Nassau in 1885, after which responsibility was transferred to the Archdiocese of New York, which sent Fr. Charles G. O'Keefe in August. Within a few days, a site was selected and Lady Georgiana Ayde-Curran, who had led the efforts to establish the parish, laid the cornerstone for the first Catholic church in the Bahamas. The first Mass was celebrated November 7, 1886, and Michael Corrigan, Archbishop of New York, dedicated the church to St. Francis Xavier on February 13, 1887.

The church's capacity was doubled in 1899 with the addition of transepts on either side of the sanctuary. The southern extension and two towers were completed in 1934, doubling the size of the church again.

On February 7, 1932, the church was designated pro-cathedral of the newly created Apostolic Prefecture of The Bahamas. It was elevated to cathedral status with the erection of the Diocese of Nassau on July 5, 1960.

A new cathedral building was dedicated in 2004, just 17 meters from the original church. The old building, now known as the Old Cathedral of St. Francis Xavier, remains in use.

== See also ==
- Catholic Church in The Bahamas
