= Frederick C. Hopkins =

English, Jesuit, and Catholic bishop at the start of the 20th century

The Most Reverend Frederick Hopkins, S.J.
- Vicar Apostolic of Belize
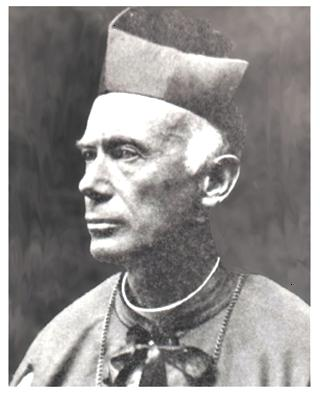
- Church: Catholic Church
- See: Titular Bishop of Athribis
- Appointed: 17 August 1899
- In office: 5 November 1899 – 9 April 1923
- Predecessor: Salvatore di Pietro, S.J.
- Successor: Joseph Anthony Murphy, S.J.

Orders
- Ordination: 23 September 1877
- Consecration: 5 November 1899 by Archbishop John Joseph Kain

Personal details
- Born: 12 December 1844 Birmingham, England
- Died: 9 April 1923 (aged 78) British Honduras

Frederick Charles Hopkins was an English Jesuit and Catholic bishop in British Honduras, Central America, at the turn of the 20th century.

== Missionary bishop ==
Frederick C. Hopkins was born 12 December 1844 in Birmingham, England. He entered the Society of Jesus in September 1868 and was ordained a priest on 23 September 1877. He arrived on the British Honduras mission in January 1888. He became Superior of the mission in 1892 and Vicar General in 1893. On the demise of Bishop Salvatore di Pietro, Hopkins was made Vicar Apostolic of British Honduras on 17 August 1899. He was consecrated bishop in St. Francis Xavier College Church in St. Louis on 5 November 1899. His cathedral parish was Holy Redeemer in Belize City. In 1910, when the Mercy motherhouse in New Orleans was no longer able to send sisters to Belize, Hopkins obtained permission from Rome and they opened an independent motherhouse in Belize. Then in 1913 Hopkins welcomed the Sisters of the Catholic Apostolate (Pallottines) to Belize, to labor first in Corozal Town and Benque Viejo.

== Writer ==
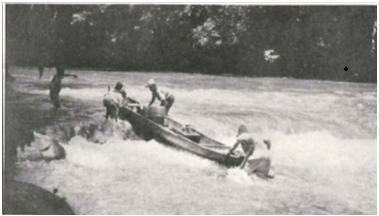
Pitpan.

Before becoming bishop, Hopkins was editor of The Angelus, the Roman Catholic newspaper for British Honduras (later "Belize"), and chronicled the early history of the mission. Much of what he wrote was from his own experience, as of the need to "get out of the pitpan and pull it up the raging waters." While bishop he wrote The Catholic Church in British Honduras (1851-1918). On 9 April 1923, Hopkins died when a coastal boat that he was travelling in sank, taking his life and that of two sisters headed with him to the Corozal mission.
