= Osmond P. Martin =

Belizean Roman Catholic bishop

The Most Reverend Osmond Peter Martin
- Bishop of Belize
- Church: Catholic Church
- See: Titular Bishop of Thucca in Mauretania
- Appointed: November 11, 1983
- In office: May 11, 1984 – November 18, 2006
- Predecessor: Robert Louis Hodapp, S.J.
- Successor: Dorick M. Wright

Orders
- Ordination: April 3, 1959
- Consecration: October 7, 1982 by Bishop Robert Hodapp, S.J.
- Rank: Auxiliary Bishop of Belize

Personal details
- Born: December 4, 1930 Dangriga, Belize
- Died: February 16, 2017 (aged 86)

Osmond Peter Martin, (December 4, 1930 – February 16, 2017) served from 1983 to 2006 as the third bishop of the Catholic Church for the Roman Catholic Diocese of Belize City-Belmopan.

== Early life ==
Osmond Peter Martin was born on December 4, 1930, in Dangriga, Belize. He studied for the Catholic priesthood at Kenrick Seminary in St. Louis, Missouri, United States of America, and was ordained a priest on April 3, 1959, in his home parish of Sacred Heart in Dangriga. He was assigned to Corozal, then to San Ignacio in the Cayo District. He returned to Corozal to help with the new school, St. Francis Xavier, and subsequently served as pastor at Sacred Heart parish in San Ignacio and St. Joseph parish in Belize City.

== Episcopacy ==
Martin was consecrated bishop on October 7, 1982, at St. John's College. Principal consecrator was Bishop Robert Louis Hodapp, S.J., of Belize and co-consecrators were Archbishop Gordon Anthony Pantin, C.S.Sp., of Port of Spain, Trinidad and Tobago, and Archbishop Samuel Emmanuel Carter, S.J., of Kingston, Jamaica. Martin served as auxiliary bishop until Bishop Hodapp's retirement on November 11, 1983, when he was appointed Bishop of the Diocese of Belize City-Belmopan with Holy Redeemer in Belize City his home parish. The Diocese had been newly named in recognition of the new capital city of Belmopan. Martin was the first native Belizean to be appointed bishop of Belize. He welcomed three more religious congregations to Belize. From 1985 to 1994 Dominican sisters (O.P.) from St. Catherine in Springfield, Kentucky, U.S., labored in Belize. And in 1986 the Columbans came to St. Ignatius, St. Vianney, and Ladyville around Belize City and, after a few years, to Dangriga. In 1998 the Viatorians came to Belize to pastor Xavier Parish in Corozal and the district villages.

== Synod, media ==
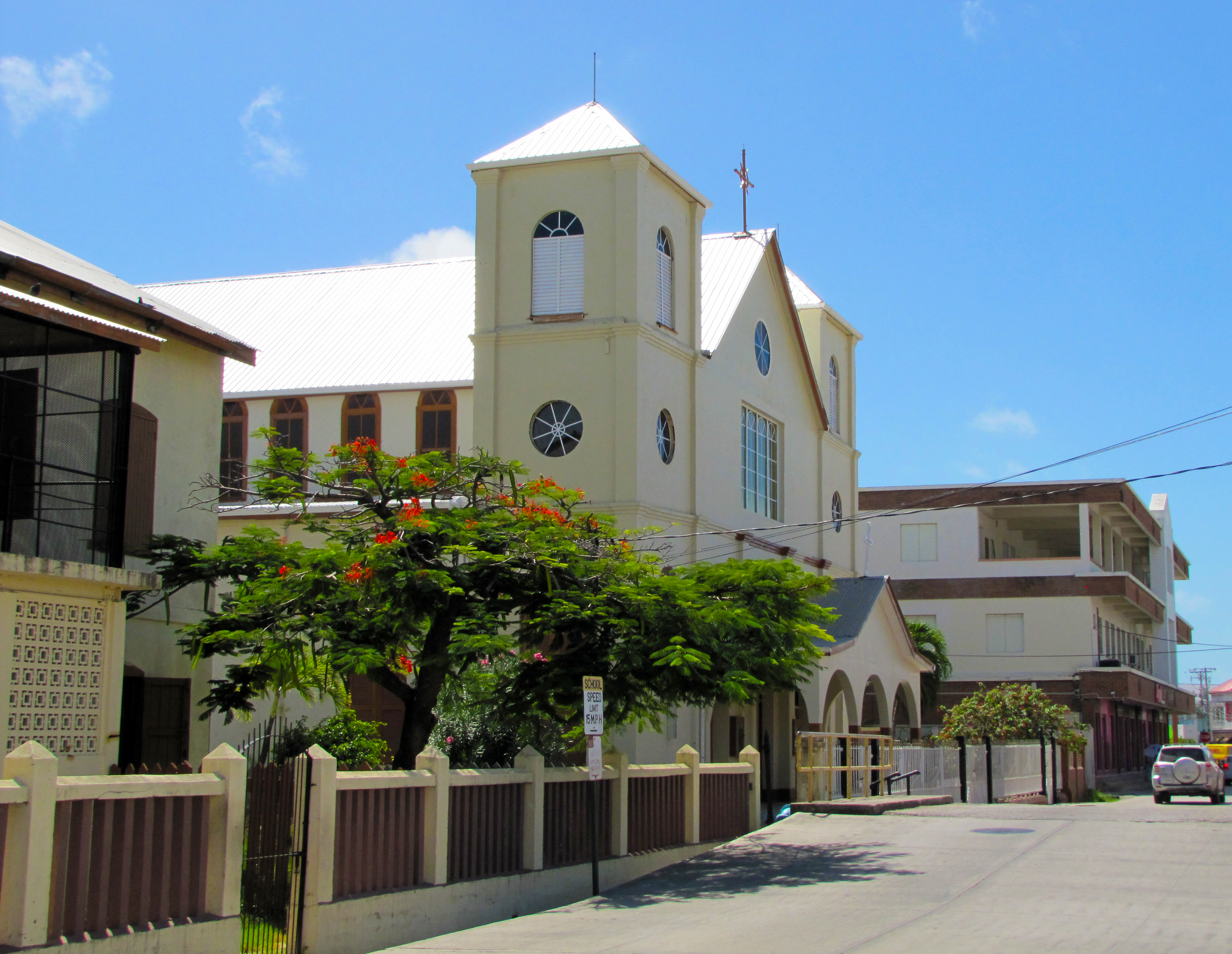
Cathedral with Diocesan Center in background

In 1989 Martin summoned the first ever synod of the diocese which gave direction to the efforts of the diocese in the ensuing years, in the areas of education, formation of the laity (family life and marriage, social concerns, youth), and liturgy. In April 2001, in Belize City next to Holy Redeemer Cathedral, Bishop Martin inaugurated the Monsignor Facundo Castillo Diocesan Center, home to nearly all of the diocesan apostolic ministries. The voice of the diocese goes out from here through radio, television, and the monthly Christian Herald newspaper. On April 4, 2002, Fr. Dorick M. Wright was ordained to be auxiliary bishop to Martin, and he succeeded Martin to the episcopacy after Martin's retirement November 18, 2006. Martin died on February 16, 2017, aged 86.

Catholic Church titles
Preceded by Robert Louis Hodapp	Bishop of Belize; 1983–2006	Succeeded by Dorick M. Wright
