= William A. Rice =

The Most Reverend William A. Rice, S.J.
- Vicar Apostolic of Belize
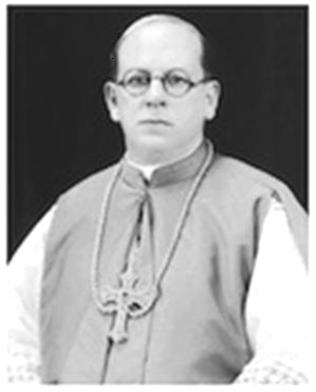
- Church: Catholic Church
- See: Titular Bishop of Rusicade
- Appointed: November 19, 1938
- In office: April 16, 1939 – February 28, 1946
- Predecessor: Joseph Anthony Murphy, S.J.
- Successor: David Francis Hickey, S.J.

Orders
- Ordination: August 27, 1925
- Consecration: April 16, 1939 by Thomas Emmet, S.J.

Personal details
- Born: October 3, 1891 Framingham, Massachusetts
- Died: February 28, 1946 (aged 54) Belize

William A. Rice SJ (October 3, 1891 – February 28, 1946) was an American-born bishop of the Catholic Church. He served as the Vicar Apostolic of Belize from 1939 to 1946. He was also the founder of Baghdad College.

== Biography ==
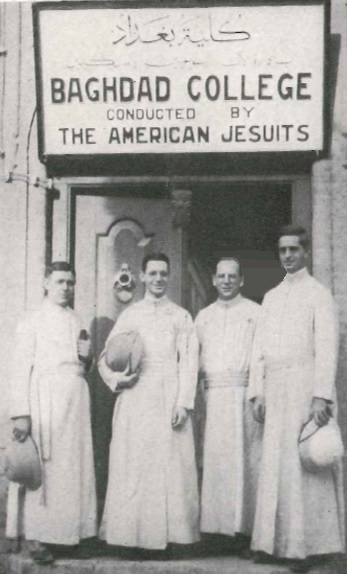
With young Jesuits

William Aloysius Rice was born in Framingham, Massachusetts. He attended Boston College High School and in 1911 entered the Society of Jesus (Jesuits) teaching at Regis High School (New York City). He then studied in Spain and completed his theology studies in Valkenburg, South Holland, the Netherlands, where he was ordained a priest on August 27, 1925. He worked in administration at Boston College and as rector of the Jesuit novitiate in Massachusetts. In the fall of 1931, at the behest of Pope Pius XI, the New York Province Jesuits opened a secondary school in Baghdad, Iraq, and Rice was given charge of the project as Jesuit Superior. He was a scholarly priest and fluent in several languages. In discussions with members of the Iraqi Board of Education, his knowledge of Arabic "enabled him to refute his opponents by referring them to their own law books."

== Episcopacy ==
On November 19, 1938, Pope Pius XI appointed Rice Titular Bishop of Rusicade and Vicar Apostolic of Belize (British Honduras). On April 16, 1939, he was consecrated in Boston by Bishop Thomas Emmet, S.J., the Vicar Apostolic of Jamaica. The principal co-consecrators were Bishop Thomas O'Leary of Springfield in Massachusetts and Archbishop Francis Spellman of New York. Rice arrived in Belize on June 18, 1939, at the age of 47. His predecessor Bishop Joseph Anthony Murphy bequeathed to him a mission field with 24 priests (all but 2 were Jesuits) and 4 Jesuit brothers, greatly assisted by religious sisters: 36 Sisters of Mercy, 7 Sisters of the Holy Family, and 53 Pallottines. The six parish churches had more than fifty outlying missions. Rice's home parish would be Holy Redeemer in Belize City.

== Work as bishop ==
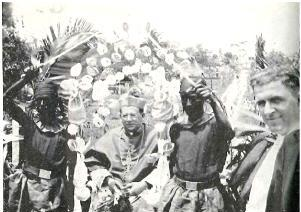
On Confirmation tour

The Bishop leaned toward the intellectual and artistic side. He promoted Gregorian chant, strove to develop good choirs at the cathedral, and encouraged the congregation to participate through singing, personally leading the children in hymn practice. It was also during Rice's term that the pioneering work of Marion M. Ganey, initiator of credit unions and cooperatives in Belize, the Fiji Islands, and South Pacific, began. These proved instrumental in the economic development of the peoples of these areas. When on November 8, 1942, a hurricane struck northern Belize causing a great deal of destruction of buildings, Rice shared his experience from Iraq where he had taught the Arabs to construct the modern buildings of Baghdad College.

Early in 1946 Bishop Rice had several heart attacks and on the night of February 28 a severe attack ended his life at the age of 54. Fr. David Hickey, S.J., was appointed to succeed him as bishop.
