= Our Lady of Guadalupe Co-Cathedral =

Roman Catholic cathedral in Belmopan, Belize

Coordinates: 17.248625°N 88.763594°W

Our Lady of Guadalupe Co-Cathedral is a Roman Catholic cathedral located in the city of Belmopan, Belize. It serves as a co-cathedral of the Roman Catholic Diocese of Belize City-Belmopan with the Holy Redeemer Cathedral in Belize City.
