= John Bernard Kevenhoerster =

German-born prelate

The Most Reverend John Bernard Kevenhoerster
- Vicar Apostolic of the Bahama Islands
- See: Bahama Islands
- Installed: January 15, 1941
- Term ended: December 9, 1949
- Predecessor: none
- Successor: Paul Leonard Hagarty
- Other post: Prefect Apostolic of the Bahama Islands (1931-41)

Orders
- Ordination: June 24, 1896
- Consecration: December 21, 1933

Personal details
- Born: November 1, 1869 Essen, Germany
- Died: December 9, 1949 (aged 80) Nassau, Bahamas
- Denomination: Catholic Church

John Bernard Kevenhoerster, O.S.B. (November 1, 1869 – December 9, 1949) was a German-born prelate of the Catholic Church. He served as the first Prefect Apostolic (1931–41) and Vicar Apostolic (1941-49) of the Bahama Islands.

== Biography ==
Kevenhoerster was born at Essen in North Rhine-Westphalia. At age 11, he immigrated with his family to the United States, where they settled in Minneapolis, Minnesota. After receiving his early education at public and parochial schools, he studied at St. John's College and the University of Minnesota. He entered the Order of Saint Benedict, more commonly known as the Benedictines, at St. John's Abbey in Collegeville, and made his profession on July 25, 1892. He then served as the assistant to the master of novices at St. John's.

He was ordained to the priesthood on June 24, 1896. He then served as a professor, as well as a chaplain and moderator of the Alexian Literary Society, at St. John's College. He later became rector of the college and prior of the abbey. From 1907 to 1929, he was pastor of St. Anselm's Church in the Bronx borough of New York City. He then served as vicar forane of the Bahama Islands, as well as superior of the Benedictines there, from 1929 to 1931. During this time, he worked as a chaplain at prisons and hospitals, and taught classes to Catholic converts.

On May 22, 1931, Kevenhoerster was appointed the first Prefect Apostolic of the newly created Prefecture Apostolic of the Bahama Islands by Pope Pius XI. Each year he made a begging trip to the United States to collect funds to be used in the building of parochial schools. On October 27, 1933, he was named to succeed the late Bishop John Dunn as titular bishop of Camuliana. He received his episcopal consecration on the following December 21 from Cardinal Patrick Hayes, with Archbishop John Murray and Bishop Joseph Busch serving as co-consecrators, at St. Patrick's Cathedral in New York.

Kevenhoerster was formally enthroned by Cardinal Hayes in Nassau on February 4, 1934. At the ceremony, Hayes commented, "New York's loss is the Bahamas' gain." Later that same year, he returned to New York to ask for financial aid for the Bahamas to complete the rebuilding of two churches destroyed by a hurricane. In 1940, he attended the annual Catholic Mission Sunday at St. Patrick's Cathedral, where he occupied the seat of honor opposite the Archbishop's throne.

On January 15, 1941, the Prefecture Apostolic was elevated to the Vicariate Apostolic of the Bahama Islands, with Kevenhoerster becoming its first Vicar Apostolic. He spent a total of twenty years in the Bahamas and, during his tenure, the islands' Catholic population rose from 3,200 (1929) to 13,054 (1954). He also established several convents and a congregation of nuns, founded St. Augustine's Monastery and College in Nassau, and encouraged the creation of Boy Scouts and Clubs in churches. In June 1946, he was named an Assistant at the Pontifical Throne by Pope Pius XII on the occasion of the golden jubilee of his priestly ordination.

Kevenhoerster experienced fragile health and suffered several strokes in his final years. He died in Nassau at age 80.

Preceded by none	Vicar Apostolic of the Bahama Islands; 1941–1949	Succeeded by Paul Leonard Hagarty
