= Baghdad College =

High school in Baghdad, Iraq

Baghdad College High School
- كلية بغداد

Location
- Baghdad; Iraq
- 33°23′6.07″N 44°22′14.28″E

Information
- Type: High school
- Religious affiliation: originally Jesuit (Catholic)
- Established: 1932; 94 years ago
- Website: baghdadcollege.net

Baghdad College (Arabic: كلية بغداد) is an elite high school for boys aged 11 to 18 in Baghdad, Iraq. It was initially a Catholic school founded by and operated by American Jesuits from Boston. The 1969 Iraqi government nationalization and expulsion of Jesuit teachers changed the character of the school. It has been compared in the British media to Eton College and is arguably Iraq's most famous secondary school for boys, having produced an Iraqi prime minister, a deputy prime minister, a vice president, two dollar billionaires and a member of the British House of Lords, among many other notable alumni.

== History ==
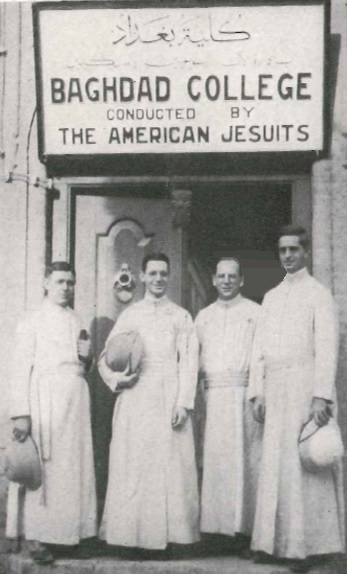
Founder Rice & young Jesuits

Baghdad College was founded in 1932 by William A. Rice, S.J. (who would later become Bishop in Belize, Central America). Pope Pius XI requested the establishment of a Catholic school in Baghdad to serve the Muslim population there, and the church sent four Jesuits to establish the school. One of them was Fr. John Mifsud, who was of Maltese origins. The school originally had four Jesuit teachers and 107 students. The school motto was "An Iraqi School for Iraqi Boys". The school was initially located in ten buildings, located at 11/45 Murabba'ah Street in Baghdad, on the east bank of the Tigris River, on 4 acres (1.6 ha) of land in the northern part of the city. Father Leo Guay designed the campus buildings, using Iraqi architecture as an influence. Courses were conducted in English. National Public Radio stated that at the time it was Baghdad's "premier high school." Soon after its founding the teaching staff included 33 Jesuits and 31 Iraqi lay teachers. Some of the Jesuits were fluent in the Arabic language, and others had established Arabic classes to try to teach themselves the language. The student body became over 1,100; Most of the students were children of the Iraqi elite. Historically about 20% of the students received scholarships. About half of the students were Muslims and half were Christians; Jews were also students. Baghdad College's pupils included Iraqis, Armenians, Egyptians, Iranians, Palestinians, and Syrians.

The school did not attempt to convert Muslims into Christianity, and students were not required to attend chapel services. Richard Cushing, a cardinal from Boston, privately criticized the school for not getting converts. Laith Kubba, an Iraqi activist and former student, stated that the school helped him become a better Muslim.

Anthony Shadid, an American, stated in an essay that the school symbolized a secular-at-the-time Iraq, the manner in which the two countries perceived each other, and the notion that the U.S. and Iraq "could allow themselves an almost idealistic version of each other. I think that's impossible today, and I say that with a certain sense of sadness."

During the Baathist Iraq era, students were required to take courses on Saddam Hussein. The classes about Saddam ended after the 2003 invasion of Iraq. As of 2005 the school still accepted the top students in Baghdad. Dexter Filkins of The New York Times stated "Today, Baghdad College is becoming more its old self." In 2012 Anthony Shadid stated that the school had experienced "disorderly decline".

The graves of five Americans are located in the school's cemetery. One of them is that of a teacher who was employed by Baghdad College for 35 years.

== Enrollment and regulations ==
Students can only enroll during the first year of study as students who wants to transfer are usually deemed as below the standards of the school, specially in their English language skills as the majority of the subjects taught in the school are taught in the English language. Students who wants to enroll are required to have accumulated a minimum of 475 marks, and go through few tests in (IQ, Science, Math, Arabic language and English language) to determine the most fit among the applying students.

== Notable alumni ==
- Nemir Kirdar, financier, billionaire businessman
- Nadhmi Auchi, billionaire businessman and philanthropist
- Loris Ohannes Chobanian, composer, conductor, classical music teacher and performer
- Ali Allawi, writer and politician
- Dr. Ayad Allawi, neurologist and former Interim Prime Minister of Iraq
- Ahmad Chalabi, PhD, Iraqi politician, former Interim Oil Minister, and former Deputy Prime Minister of Iraq.
- Adil Abdul Mahdi, PhD, Iraqi politician, economist, and Vice President of Iraq from 2005 to 2011.
- Mithal al-Alusi, Iraqi politician
- Kanan Makiya, PhD, author, academic, and founder of the Iraq Memory Foundation.
- Nizar Hamdoon (1944-2003): Iraq's ambassador to the United States and the United Nations, a deputy foreign minister of Iraq, and under-secretary of its Foreign Ministry
- Professor Jim al-Khalili, PhD, OBE, British theoretical physicist, author, and broadcaster
- Professor Ara Darzi, Baron Darzi of Denham, member of British Parliament, surgical pioneer
- Dr. Munjed Al Muderis, pioneering osteointegration surgeon and human rights activist.
- Qusay Hussein, son of Saddam Hussein
- Uday Hussein, son of Saddam Hussein

== Campuses ==
Since 2007 Baghdad College High School Have had opened several campuses around the capital, Mostly because of the ongoing civil war back then and the increasing number of students, it has to be mentioned that these campuses act as separate schools with their own systems and principals, but share the same name of the majestic Baghdad college, and all are considered part of the distinguished students high schools in the ministry of education.

- 1-Al-Adhamyia campus, the first and original campus.
- 2-Zayona campus, the second campus, was founded in 2007 to provide security for the students after the attack on the original campus in 2006.
- 3-Bab Al-Sharqi Campus, the third campus, and the first campus of the school to be for Girls only, and it is shared with Al-Aqida High school of Girls, was founded in 2008
- 4-Haai Al-Jihad campus, the fourth campus, and the first campus in Al-Karkh, was founded in 2009.

== See also ==
- Al-Hikma University (Baghdad)
- List of Jesuit sites
