= Patrick Pinder =

The Most Reverend Patrick Christopher Pinder
- Archbishop of Nassau
- Church: Roman Catholic Church
- Archdiocese: Nassau
- See: Nassau
- Appointed: 17 February 2004
- Installed: 4 May 2004
- Predecessor: Lawrence Aloysius Burke
- Previous posts: Titular Bishop of Casae Calanae (2003-04); Auxiliary Bishop of Nassau (2003-04); President of the Antilles Episcopal Conference (2011-17)

Orders
- Ordination: 15 August 1980
- Consecration: 15 August 2003 by Lawrence Aloysius Burke

Personal details
- Born: Patrick Christopher Pinder; 1 November 1953 (age 72) Nassau, Bahamas
- Education: Saint Meinrad Seminary and School of Theology; Catholic University of Louvain
- Motto: Of one heart and mind
- Coat of arms

Patrick Christopher Pinder, CMG, KCHS, (born November 1, 1953) is a Bahamian Catholic prelate who has served as Archbishop of Nassau since 2004.

== Biography ==
Pinder was born in Nassau and was baptized at St. Francis Xavier Cathedral and grew up in Nassau. After graduating high school in 1971, he entered Saint Meinrad Seminary and School of Theology in the United States where he completed a degree in Philosophy in 1975. He later obtained his S.T.B./M.A degree in theology from Catholic University of Louvain in Belgium in 1978.

He was ordained a Transitional Deacon on July 20, 1978 and ordained to the priesthood on August 15, 1980. He held various posts within the Archdiocese of Nassau including Moderator of the Curia, Vicar for Pastoral Affairs and Rector of St. Francis Xavier Cathedral.

Pinder received his Episcopal Ordination on June 27, 2003 and became Auxiliary Bishop of Nassau, a post he held for just 11 months before being installed as Archbishop on May 4, 2004.
