= Roman Catholic Archdiocese of Nassau =

Latin Catholic ecclesiastical jurisdiction in the Caribbean

Coordinates: 25.0759°N 77.3482°W

Archdiocese of Nassau Archidioecesis Nassaviensis

Location
- Country: The Bahamas
- Territory: The Bahamas
- Ecclesiastical province: Province of Nassau

Statistics
- Area: 13,872 km^{2} (5,356 sq mi)
- Population: Total; Catholics: (as of 2013); 340,400; 50,202 (14.7%)

Information
- Denomination: Catholic
- Sui iuris church: Latin Church
- Rite: Roman Rite
- Established: March 21, 1929
- Cathedral: St. Francis Xavier Cathedral, Nassau
- Patron saint: St. Francis Xavier, St. Therese of Lisieux

Current leadership
- Pope: Francis
- Archbishop: Patrick Christopher Pinder

Map

Website
- archdioceseofnassau.org

The Archdiocese of Nassau (Latin: Archidioecesis Nassaviensis) is an archdiocese of the Latin Church of the Catholic Church in the Caribbean. The archdiocese encompasses the islands of the former British dependency of the Bahamas. The archbishop is the metropolitan responsible for the Diocese of Hamilton in Bermuda, which is a suffragan diocese, and the Mission sui iuris of Turks and Caicos, and is a member of the Antilles Episcopal Conference.

The first permanent Roman Catholic presence in the Bahamas was established in 1885 by the Archdiocese of New York, given the trade connections between the Bahamas and New York City. The archdiocese was originally erected as the Prefecture Apostolic of the Bahama in March 1929, and was no longer associated with New York by 1932. The diocese was subsequently elevated to the Vicariate Apostolic of the Bahama Islands in January 1941, and then to a full diocese, as the diocese of Nassau, in June 1960. On June 22, 1999, the diocese was again elevated as the new Archdiocese of Nassau.

As of 2004, the archdiocese contains 30 parishes, 15 active diocesan priests, 14 religious priests, and 48,000 Catholics. It also has 28 Women Religious, 14 Religious Brothers, and 13 permanent deacons.

== Bishops ==
=== Ordinaries ===
- John Bernard Kevenhoerster O.S.B. (1931–1949)
- Paul Leonard Hagarty O.S.B. (1950–1981)
- Lawrence Aloysius Burke, S.J. (1981–2004), appointed Archbishop of Kingston in Jamaica
- Patrick Christopher Pinder (2004–present)

=== Auxiliary bishop ===
- Patrick Christopher Pinder (2003–2004), appointed Archbishop here
