= Fernand J. Cheri =

American Catholic bishop (1952–2023)

His Excellency, The Most Reverend Fernand J. Cheri OFM
- Auxiliary Bishop of New Orleans
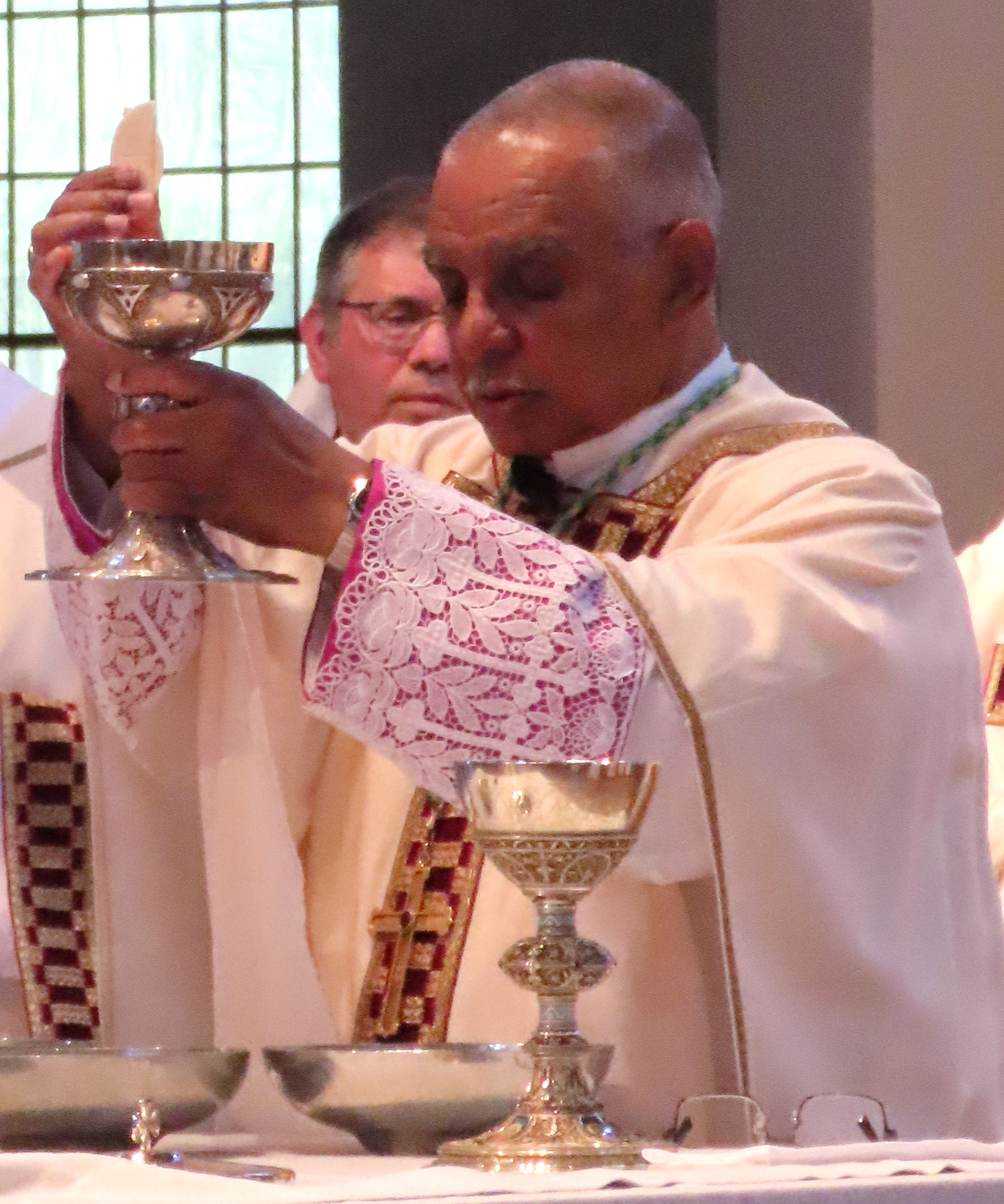
- Bishop Cheri in 2022
- Church: Catholic Church
- Archdiocese: New Orleans
- Appointed: January 12, 2015
- Installed: March 23, 2015
- Term ended: March 21, 2023
- Other post: Titular Bishop of Membressa (2015–2023)

Orders
- Ordination: May 20, 1978 by Philip Hannan
- Consecration: March 23, 2015 by Gregory Michael Aymond, Wilton Daniel Gregory, J. Terry Steib

Personal details
- Born: January 28, 1952 New Orleans, Louisiana, U.S.
- Died: March 21, 2023 (aged 71)
- Motto: "God is my strength"
- Coat of arms

Styles of Fernand Joseph Cheri
- Reference style: His Excellency
- Spoken style: Your Excellency
- Religious style: Bishop

Fernand Joseph "Ferd" Cheri III, OFM (January 28, 1952 – March 21, 2023) was an American prelate of the Catholic Church. A member of the Order of Friars Minor, Cheri served as an auxiliary bishop of Archdiocese of New Orleans from 2015 until his death in 2023.

== Biography ==
=== Early life ===
Fernand Cheri was born on January 28, 1952, in New Orleans to Fernand Jr. and Gladys Cheri. He received his high school education at St. John Vianney Preparatory Seminary in New Orleans. He went on to study at St. Joseph Seminary College in Covington, Louisiana, and Notre Dame Seminary in New Orleans.

=== Priesthood ===
Cheri was ordained a priest for the Archdiocese of New Orleans by Archbishop Philip Hannan on May 20, 1978. After his ordination. Cheri received a Master of Theology degree from Xavier University of Louisiana's Institute for Black Catholic Studies in New Orleans. Cheri's first pastoral assignment was as parochial vicar at Our Lady of Lourdes Parish in New Orleans and St. Joseph the Worker Parish in Marrero, Louisiana, serving both parishes until 1984. He then became the pastor of St. Joseph the Worker Parish in 1984 and after a year became the pastor of St. Francis de Sales Parish in New Orleans from 1985 to 1990. Cheri was appointed administrator of St. Theresa of the Child Jesus Parish in New Orleans from 1990 to 1991.

Cheri entered the novitiate of the Sacred Heart Province of the Order of Friars Minor (Franciscans) in 1992. He professed solemn vows in the order on August 26, 1996. As a Franciscan, Cheri served as chaplain at Hales Franciscan High School in Chicago from 1994 to 1996. He served as pastor of St. Vincent de Paul Parish in Nashville, Tennessee, from 1996 to 2002. During that time he also served as a member of the provincial council for the Franciscan Province of the Sacred Heart from 1999 to 2002.

Cheri was assigned to St. Benedict the Black Friary in East St. Louis, Illinois, from 2002 to 2007. During these years he was also a guidance counselor and choir director of the Gospel Crusaders at Althoff Catholic High School in Belleville, Illinois. He undertook continuing education from 2007 to 2008, and then served as director of the Office of Friar Life in East St. Louis from 2008 to 2009, and as associate director of campus ministry at Xavier University of Louisiana from 2010 to 2011. Cheri then served as director of campus ministry at Quincy University in Quincy, Illinois, and as vicar of the Holy Cross Friary in Quincy from 2011 to 2015. Cheri has written articles and books on African-American Catholic liturgy, and served as an archivist of Black religious music.

=== Auxiliary bishop of New Orleans ===
Cheri was named Titular Bishop of Membressa and Auxiliary Bishop of the Archdiocese of New Orleans by Pope Francis on January 12, 2015. His episcopal consecration took place on March 23, 2015, at the Cathedral-Basilica of Saint Louis, King of France in New Orleans. Archbishop Gregory Aymond of New Orleans was the consecrator. Archbishop Wilton Gregory and Bishop J. Terry Steib were the co-consecrators.

=== Death ===
Cheri died on 21 March 2023, at the age of 71.

== See also ==
- Catholic Church hierarchy
- Catholic Church in the United States
- Historical list of the Catholic bishops of the United States
- List of Catholic bishops of the United States
- Lists of patriarchs, archbishops, and bishops

== Episcopal succession ==
Catholic Church titles
Preceded by Waldemar Passini Dalbello	Titular Bishop of Membressa; 2015–2023	Succeeded by Vacant
