= Diocese of Belize City–Belmopan =

Latin Catholic ecclesiastical jurisdiction in Central America

Coordinates: 17°29′51.7″N 88°11′20.2″W

Diocese of Belize City–Belmopan Dioecesis Belizepolitanus-Belmopanus
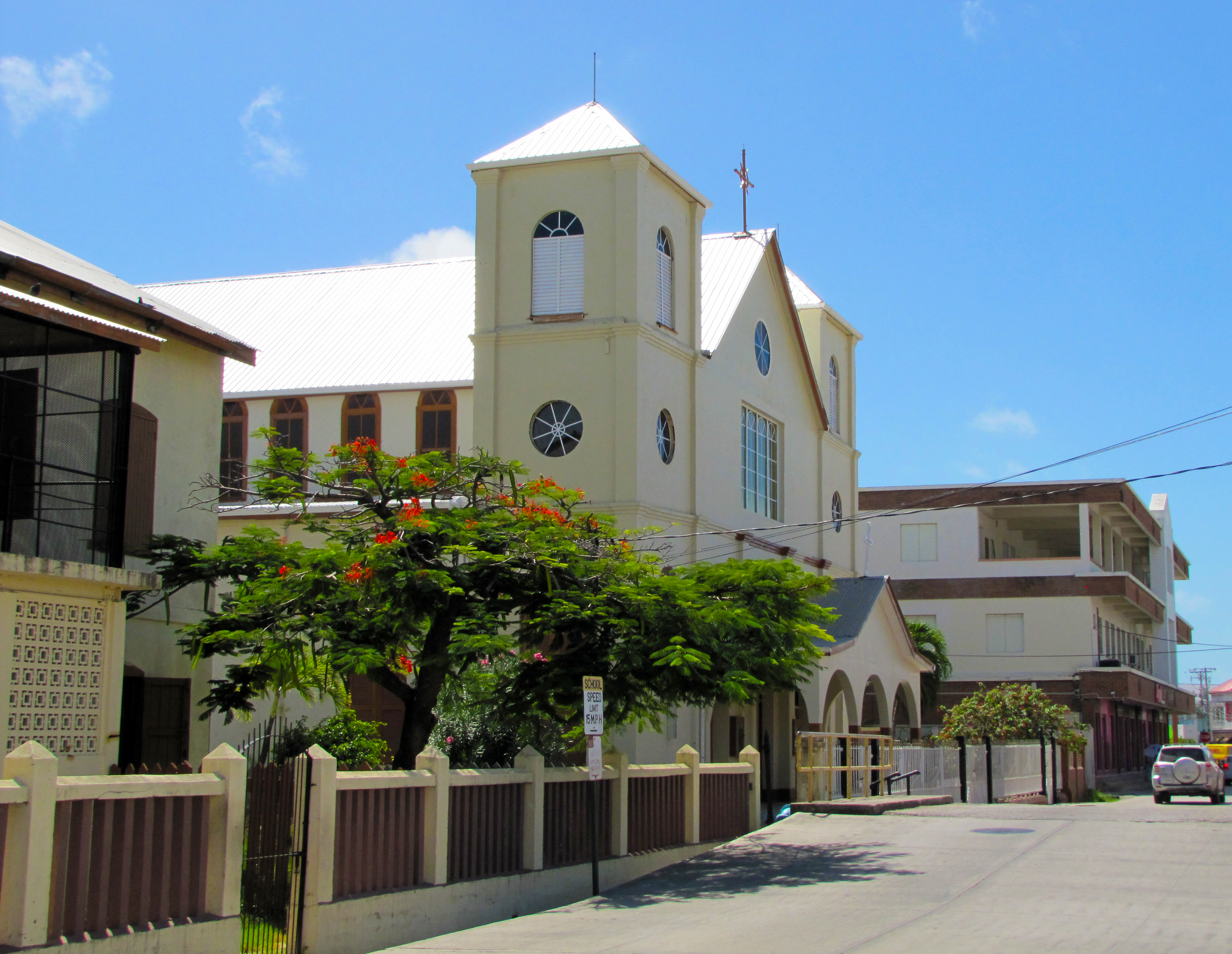
- Holy Redeemer Cathedral

Location
- Country: Belize
- Ecclesiastical province: Province of Kingston in Jamaica

Statistics
- Area: 2,591 km^{2} (1,000 sq mi)
- Population: Total; Catholics: (as of 2014); 334,297; 162,100 (48.5%)

Information
- Denomination: Catholic
- Sui iuris church: Latin Church
- Rite: Roman Rite
- Cathedral: Holy Redeemer Cathedral (Belize City)
- Co-cathedral: Our Lady of Guadalupe Co-Cathedral (Belmopan)

Current leadership
- Pope: Leo XIV
- Bishop: Sede Vacante
- Metropolitan Archbishop: Kenneth David Oswin Richards
- Auxiliary Bishops: Christopher Glancy, C.S.V.

Website
- catholic.bz

The Roman Catholic Diocese of Belize City–Belmopan (Latin: Dioecesis Belizepolitanus-Belmopanus) is a diocese of the Latin Church of the Roman Catholic Church in continental Central America. The diocese comprises the entirety of Belize, the former British dependency British Honduras. It is a Latin suffragan of the Archdiocese of Kingston (on Jamaica) and a member of the Antilles Episcopal Conference, yet still depends on the missionary Roman Congregation for the Evangelization of Peoples.

The cathedral of the diocese, also known as its mother church, is Holy Redeemer Cathedral in Belize City. Our Lady of Guadalupe Co-Cathedral in Belmopan is the co-cathedral of the diocese.

== History ==
The diocese was erected as the Apostolic Prefecture of British Honduras (the country's colonial name) on 10 June 1888, on territory split off from the then Apostolic Vicariate of Jamaica. It was elevated on 1 March 1893 as the Apostolic Vicariate of British Honduras, hence entitled to a titular bishop. Its name was changed to the Apostolic Vicariate of Belize, after its see, on 15 December 1925. It was elevated to the Diocese of Belize on 29 February 1956. On 31 December 1983 the name was changed to Diocese of Belize City–Belmopan.

== Statistics ==
As per 2014, it pastorally served 162,100 Catholics (48.5% of 334,297 total) on 22,963 km^{2} in 13 parishes and 5 missions with 46 priests (14 diocesan, 32 religious), 2 deacons, 95 lay religious (38 brothers, 57 sisters) and a seminarian.

== Bishops ==
(all Roman Rite)

=== Ordinaries ===
Apostolic Prefect of British Honduras

1. Salvatore di Pietro, SJ (10 June 1888 – 3 January 1893)

Apostolic Vicars of British Honduras

1. Salvatore di Pietro, SJ (3 January 1893 – 23 August 1898)
2. Frederick C. Hopkins, SJ (17 August 1899 – 19 April 1923)
3. Joseph Anthony Murphy, SJ (11 December 1923 – 15 December 1925)

Apostolic Vicars of Belize

1. Joseph Anthony Murphy, SJ (15 December 1925 – 16 July 1938)
2. William A. Rice, SJ (19 November 1938 – 28 February 1946)
3. David Francis Hickey, SJ (10 June 1948 – 29 February 1956)

Bishops of Belize City

1. David Francis Hickey, SJ (29 February 1956 – 1 August 1957)
2. Robert Louis Hodapp, SJ (2 March 1958 – 11 November 1983)

Bishops of Belize City–Belmopan

1. Osmond P. Martin (11 November 1983 – 18 November 2006)
2. Dorick M. Wright (18 November 2006 – 26 January 2017)
3. Lawrence Sydney Nicasio (26 January 2017 – 1 January 2024)

=== Auxiliary bishops ===
- Osmond P. Martin (8 June 1982 – 11 November 1983), appointed Bishop here
- Dorick M. Wright (12 December 2001 – 18 November 2006), appointed Bishop here
- Christopher Glancy, CSV (18 February 2012 – )

== See also ==
- List of Catholic dioceses in Central America
- History of Roman Catholicism in Belize
