= Lawrence Aloysius Burke =

Jamaican clergy

The Most Reverend Lawrence Aloysius Burke S.J.
- Archbishop of Kingston in Jamaica
- See: Kingston in Jamaica
- Installed: 17 February 2004
- Term ended: 12 April 2008
- Predecessor: Edgerton Roland Clarke
- Successor: Donald James Reece
- Other posts: Bishop of Nassau (1981–1999); Archbishop of Nassau (1999–2004); Superior of Turks and Caicos (1984–1998)

Orders
- Ordination: 16 June 1968
- Consecration: 11 October 1981

Personal details
- Born: 27 October 1932 Kingston, Jamaica
- Died: 24 January 2010 (aged 77) Kingston, Jamaica
- Denomination: Catholic Church
- Education: Boston College; Weston College; Wesleyan University
- Coat of arms

Lawrence Aloysius Burke SJ OJ (27 October 1932 – 24 January 2010) was the 4th Roman Catholic Archbishop of the Roman Catholic Archdiocese of Kingston in Jamaica. He also served previously as the 1st Archbishop of the newly created Roman Catholic Archdiocese of Nassau beginning in 1999.

Born in Kingston, Jamaica, he was ordained as a Jesuit priest on 16 June 1968. Burke was appointed Bishop of what is now the Roman Catholic Archdiocese of Nassau, Bahamas on 17 July 1981 (the first born in the Caribbean), and was consecrated 11 October 1981. In June 1999, Pope John Paul II named Bishop Burke Archbishop of the Archdiocese of Nassau.

On 17 February 2004, Pope John Paul II appointed Archbishop Burke Archbishop of the Roman Catholic Archdiocese of Kingston in Jamaica. Archbishop Burke retired on 12 April 2008.

Archbishop Burke obtained a BA in philosophy from Boston College (1957), an MA in philosophy from Boston College (1958), a PhL (Licentiate in Philosophy) from Weston College (1958), an MA in theology from Boston College (1965), an STL (Licentiate in Sacred Theology) from Weston College (1965), and a MALS from Wesleyan University (1970).

He died of cancer in Kingston, aged 77.
