= Holy Redeemer Cathedral =

Coordinates: 17°29′46″N 88°11′13″W

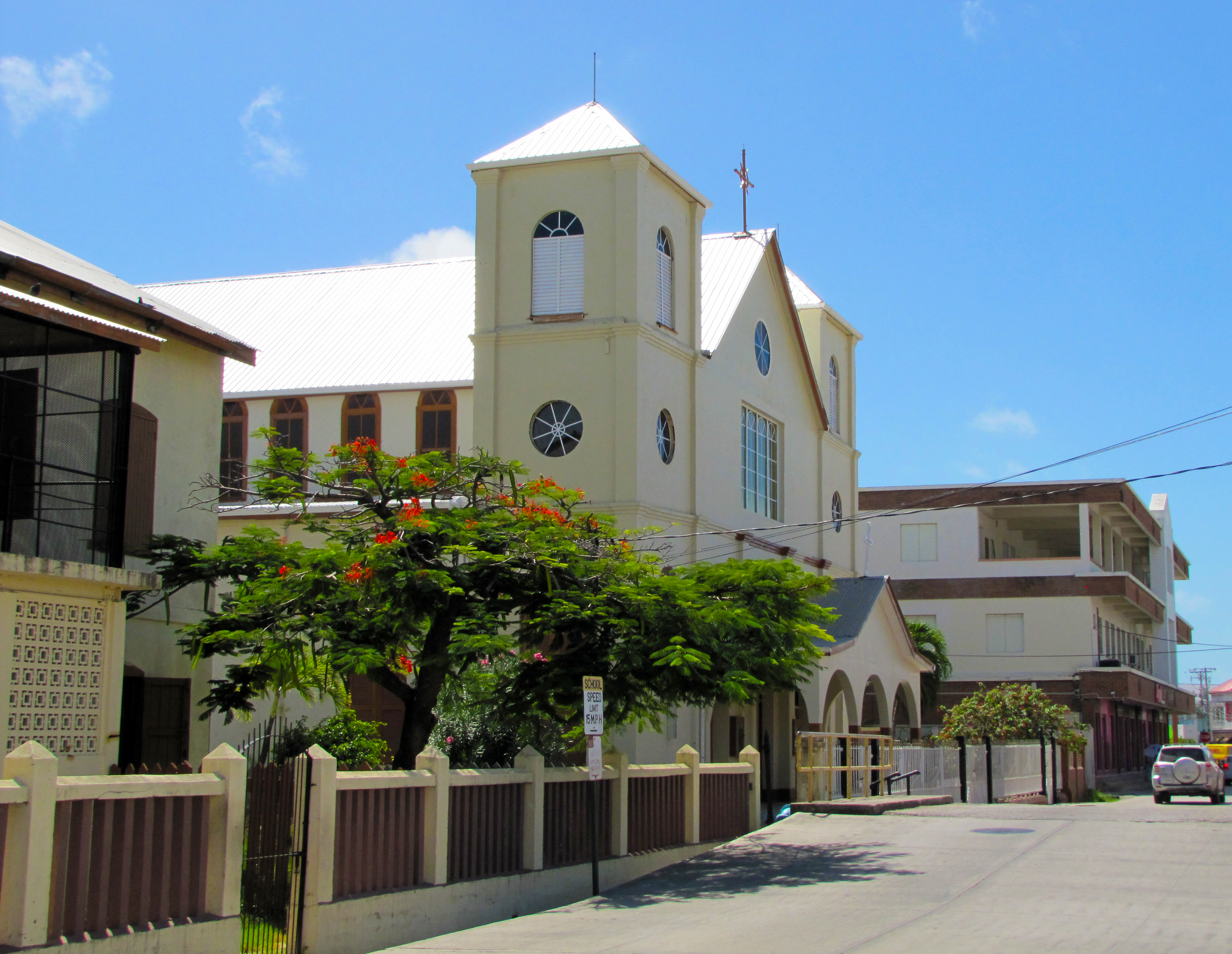
- View from the west side, 2015
- Holy Redeemer Cathedral
- Location: Belize City
- Country: Belize
- Denomination: Roman Catholic
- Website: www.holyredeemerbelize.org

History
- Status: Cathedral

Architecture
- Functional status: Active
- Years built: 1858

Specifications
- Materials: brick

Administration
- Province: Kingston in Jamaica
- Diocese: Belize City-Belmopan
- Parish: Holy Redeemer

Holy Redeemer Cathedral is a Roman Catholic cathedral in the city of Belize City, Belize. It is canonically the mother church of the Roman Catholic Diocese of Belize City-Belmopan. It shares the role with Our Lady of Guadalupe Co-Cathedral in Belmopan, though the Bishop's offices remain at Holy Redeemer. Pope John Paul II made the first Papal visit to Belize and visited the cathedral in 1983.

== History ==
The present structure goes back to 1858 and is of brick, mostly salvaged from the ballast of sailing ships that transported logwood and mahogany back to England. In 1888 the side walls were moved out in line with the side chapels and bell towers, with high windows and a sacristy added. The church became a cathedral in 1894, with Salvatore di Pietro the first bishop to reside in Belize. The building displayed its fully brick exterior until the 1920s, but has since been plastered over. The interior is entirely of mahogany but only the pews, high altar, and side altars retain their mahogany finish. The rest has been painted over. The disused choir loft once housed a pipe organ, destroyed by termites. After the 1961 hurricane the wooden floor was replaced with concrete and tile. The same storm destroyed many of the stained glass windows and a di Pietro memorial.

Additions following Vatican II include the main altar facing the people and the tabernacle moved to a side altar, formerly Marian. The picture of Our Lady of Guadalupe now occupies the other side altar formerly dedicated to Saint Joseph. Also added in the 1970s were a baptismal font and two figured mahogany lecterns. Two of the four corner confessionals in Gothic style remain; the other two were ruined by termites and replaced with an Esquipula shrine and a replica of Michelangelo's Pieta. The bishop's throne and the communion rail were removed as part of the Vatican II reforms. Two iron Corinthian pillars have been added to the front portico. Three bishops are buried under the floor of the baptismal font: di Pietro, Frederick C. Hopkins, and William A. Rice. The steeples of the twin towers have been battered over the years. The original Byzantine onion domes were changed in the early 1900s to soaring, pyramidal steeples (at left) demolished by the 1931 hurricane. Their shorter replacements were blown away in subsequent storms. The bells are in one tower; four peal for joyous events; three for funerals alternating with all four; two for church services; and one for the Angelus at 6:00 a.m., noon, and 6:00 p.m.

== Gallery ==
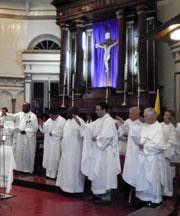
Chrism Mass

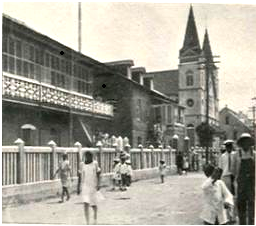
1931
