= List of social activities at Durham University =

This is a list of social activities at the University of Durham, including details of clubs, societies and other common leisure activities associated with Durham University. Over 200 student clubs and organisations run within Durham Students' Union.

== Sports ==
=== General ===
- College Varsity, a sporting competition between college teams from Durham University and the University of York held alternately at York and Durham in the Lent term since 2014.
- Doxbridge Tournament, an unofficial sporting competition held annually since 1999 at the start of the Easter holiday between college teams from Durham University, the University of Oxford, the University of Cambridge and (since 2011) the University of York.
- Team Durham, formerly the Durham University Athletic Union, a student-run organisation responsible for sport at Durham University. In 2006, the Athletic Union was rebranded "Team Durham" to signify a more modern approach to sport at Durham. In contrast to most British universities, it is a separate organisation with the status of a students' union, rather than a part of Durham Students' Union, the primary student representative body at Durham University.
- There are many college sports teams which allow for participation in sport at a less intense level than the university sports teams. There are leagues or tournaments between colleges in most major sports, with many colleges having multiple teams covering a wide range of ability levels. This is a contributing factor to the high participation in sport at the university.

=== Clubs ===
- Association football:
  - DUAFC
- Rugby union:
  - Durham University Rugby Football Club, previous members have included England captains Phil de Glanville and Will Carling.
- Quidditch:
  - Durhamstrang

=== Rowing ===
- Durham University Boat Club
- Boat Race of the North

Durham College Rowing organises several regattas and head races each year:

- Novice Cup – a coxed IV regatta held in the first term for new rowers. This was known as the Hatfield Cup until 2003, when Durham College Rowing took over the organising of the event.
- Novice Head – a 1.8 km upstream head race for novice coxed IVs.
- Senate Cup – a regatta for men's and women's coxed IVs. This intercollegiate event on the Wear in Durham has been running for well over a hundred years; with interruptions due to poor weather, the First World War, the Second World War and the COVID-19 pandemic.
- Senate Head – a 1.8 km upstream head race for experienced coxed IVs.
- Admiral's Regatta – a summer regatta; generally the final rowing event for the academic year.

==== College boat clubs ====
Each college boat club is an independent organisation registered with British Rowing. They are also members of Durham College Rowing.

Blade	Club
Collingwood College Boat Club	Collingwood College Boat Club
Grey College Boat Club	Grey College Boat Club
Hatfield College Boat Club	Hatfield College Boat Club
Hild Bede Boat Club	Hild Bede Boat Club
Josephine Butler College Boat Club	Butler College Boat Club
	South College Boat Club
St Aidan's College Boat Club	St Aidan's College Boat Club
St Chad's College Boat Club	St Chad's College Boat Club
St Cuthbert's Society Boat Club	St Cuthbert's Society Boat Club
St John's College Boat Club	St John's College Boat Club
St Mary's College Boat Club	St Mary's College Boat Club
Trevelyan College Boat Club	Trevelyan College Boat Club
University College Boat Club	University College Boat Club
Ustinov Boat Club	Ustinov Boat Club
Van Mildert Boat Club	Van Mildert Boat Club
Stephenson College Boat Club	Stephenson College Boat Club
John Snow Boat Club	John Snow College Boat Club

== Student unions ==
Durham has a central students' union as well as junior common rooms (or equivalent) in each college.

- Durham Students' Union, the Durham-wide federal union

== Durham Union Society ==
The Durham Union Society (DUS), commonly referred to as the Durham Union, is a debating society, founded in 1842, by the students of the University of Durham, which then comprised only Hatfield Hall and University College. Commonly referred to as the Union, or the DUS, it is the university's largest society, with over 3,000 members in residence, and 24,000 worldwide. Until 1899, when the Durham Students' Union's ancestor was founded, the society acted as the university's students' union.

== Academic societies ==
- Arthur Holmes Geological Society
- Durham Astronomical Society
- Durham Spaceflight
- Durham University Accounting and Finance Society
- Durham University Aeronautical Society
- Durham University Anthropology Society
- Durham University Archaeology Society
- Durham University Biological Society
- Durham University Business Society
- Durham University Business Psychology Society
- Durham University Chemistry Society
- Durham University Classics Society
- Durham University Combined Honours Social Society
- Durham University Computing Society
- Durham University Economics Society
- Durham University Education Society
- Durham University Engineering Society
- Durham University English Literature Society
- Durham University Finance Society
- Durham University French Society
- Durham University Geographical Society
- Durham University German Language and Cultures Society
- Durham University History Society
- Durham University Law Society
- Durham University Philosophy, Politics and Economics (PPE) Society
- Durham University Marketing Society
- Durham University Mathematical Society
- Durham University Medical Society
- Durham University Natural Science Society
- Durham University Women in STEM
- Durham University Philosophy Society
- Durham University Psychology Society
- Durham University Palaeontological Society
- Durham Physics Society
- Durham University Politics and International Relations Society
- Durham ELSA
- Durham University Society of Applied Social Science
- Durham University Sustainable Finance Society
- Durham University Theology Society
- Durham University Chemical Society
- Geology for Global Development (Durham Group)

== Drama societies ==
=== Durham Student Theatre ===
Durham Student Theatre (DST, formerly Durham University Student Theatre, DUST) is a student-run organisation responsible for theatre at Durham University, with performances put on every week of term at the Assembly Rooms Theatre.

DST acts as an umbrella organisation for the many theatre companies based at the university, such as Durham University Light Opera Group (DULOG). There are also numerous college based theatre groups, run by the Junior Common Room of the individual colleges, some of which are college members only, with most being open to all.

=== Durham Revue ===
The Durham Revue is an established sketch comedy group. In 1974, four students founded 'DUST' (Durham University Sensible Thespians), which initially produced comedy revue shows exclusively for Durham student audiences. However, in 1977, under the presidency of Arthur Bostrom, DUST took their first show to the Edinburgh Fringe Festival. This inaugural Fringe show included John Inge (Bishop of Worcester) and Jennie Campbell (former BBC comedy producer). The group changed its name to the 'Durham Revue' in 1988.

Its members write and perform all material themselves and shows are put on annually at the Assembly Rooms Theatre, and the professional Gala Theatre where they perform alongside the Cambridge Footlights and the Oxford Revue. The Durham Revue also travels yearly to Cambridge, Oxford, and the Edinburgh Fringe where they perform for the full run of the festival.

The Durham Revue membership generally consists of six writers and performers. Membership is based upon audition and interview, and these take place just once a year during Michaelmas Term. Former members include Jeremy Vine, Nish Kumar, Ed Gamble, and Alex Macqueen.

== Durham Student Music ==
Durham Student Music (DSM, formerly Music Durham and Durham University Music Society, DUMS) is a student-run organisation responsible for the majority of student music activities at Durham University. Performances take place in university venues such as the Great Hall of Durham Castle, the Mark Hillery Arts Centre in Collingwood College and the Margot Fonteyn ballroom in Durham Students' Union, as well as external venues such as Durham Cathedral, Durham Town Hall, the Gala Theatre and Sage Gateshead.

Durham Student Music is an umbrella organisation for the many ensembles based at the university. It currently consists of over 30 university ensembles, including the Orchestral Society (DUOS), Palatinate Orchestra (DUPO), Choral Society (DUCS), Big Band (DUBB), Chamber Choir (DUCC), concert band (DUCB), brass band and gamelan. There are also many college music groups, including chapel choirs, chamber ensembles and function bands which perform at college events.

== Miscellaneous societies ==
- Purple Radio, the student radio station
- Palatinate, Durham's independent student-run fortnightly newspaper, has been continually published since 1948
- Mostly Harmless, student satirical publication
- The Grove, student literary publication
- Durham Inter-Collegiate Christian Union, the university's most prominent student Christian organisation, founded in 1931
- Durham University Conservative and Unionist Association (DUCUA), the university's Conservative society

== Leisure activities ==
- Formal Hall, a formal dinner in a college
