= St Cuthbert's Society Boat Club =

British rowing club

St. Cuthbert's Society Boat Club
- Location: St. Cuthbert's Society Boat House, Durham
- Coordinates: 54°46′33″N 1°34′2″W
- Home water: River Wear
- Founded: 1893; 133 years ago
- Affiliations: British Rowing, St Cuthbert's Society

St Cuthbert's Society Boat Club (SCSBC) is the rowing club of St Cuthbert's Society at Durham University.

SCSBC is a registered Boat Club through British Rowing, with Boat Code "SCB" and is a member organisation of Durham College Rowing.

SCSBC was founded in the summer of 1893 with the aim of representing St Cuthbert's Society at collegiate level, alongside clubs from University College, Hatfield College and Durham University.

== History ==
In its early years the club was most successful in sculling, with H.S.S. Jackson, E.C. Summers, H. de l’Isle Booth and T.M. Falconer enjoying success. Between the world wars the Club went into a decline, but returned after World War II. The sculling success was continued by Tom Bishop and Pete Brett.

The Club made their first visit to the Tideway in 1966 for Head of the River Race. A notable success came in the 1980s, with the crew of Henry Blackshaw, Daniel Tomlinson, Chris Lawrence and Tim Pitt coxed by Patrick Hurley going from Novices to Elite status in one year, and the women's crew of Elaine Hamilton, Vicky Foulsham, Elspeth Lindsley and Dawn Cox, coxed by Patrick Herlihy almost repeating the feat and going to Women's Henley.

== Racing ==
The club regularly attends the Head of the River Race on The Championship Course in London, with the highest finishing result of 126th in 2015.

The Men's squad qualified for the Temple Challenge Cup at Henley Royal Regatta in 2003, 2003 and 2015.

SCSBC are a regular competitor at Durham Regatta, winning the Victor Ludorum in 2008.

The Club attends local races in Newcastle, Stockton, York, Chester-le-Street, Hexham and Wansbeck, as well as other races in Durham such as Durham Small Boats' Head, Durham Small Boats' Head and Durham City Regatta and the Durham College Rowing Novice Cup, Novice Head, Senate Cup, Admiral's Regatta.

== Boathouse and facilities ==
The club's boathouse is located by The Racecourse, close to the Durham Regatta finish line, and was acquired by the Society shortly after its establishment. Built in 1894, it was previously home to Durham Amateur Rowing Club which is now located in newer premises further upstream. It has an ergo loft, drawing room and riverside balcony.

Members of the club can also attend social functions, including a formal Boat Club Ceilidh in February, a men's squad warriors social, and a boat club day in the summer which is celebrated with a riverside barbecue, squad photographs and recreational rowing.

== Governance ==
The club is run by a student executive committee who are elected annually by the entire membership at an AGM.

== See also ==
- University rowing (UK)
- List of rowing clubs on the River Wear
