= Durham College Rowing =

British sports committee

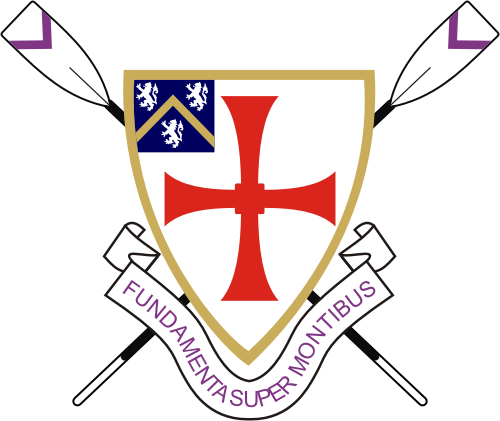
Durham College Rowing Coat of Arms

Durham College Rowing (commonly abbreviated to DCR) represents all sixteen college boat clubs in Durham University and organises some rowing activities on behalf of all member clubs.

In February 2020, together with Durham University Boat Club, DCR members made up c.30% of the rowers, scullers and coxes in the British Rowing northern region. The intake of freshers each year attracts large numbers to take up the sport with typically around 500 joining learn to row courses each autumn.

DCR organises inter-collegiate competitions, trailers to competitions off the River Wear, training courses (learn to cox, coaching, launch driving), swim tests, Senate Boat Club, and an annual ball for rowers across the university.

DCR also provides a forum for college captains to meet and discuss current rowing events, particularly safety issues, with each other and with the executive committee.

The River Wear in Durham is amongst the most crowded waterways in England, with sixteen Colleges, the University, several Schools and the town club, plus hired dinghies (Brown's Boats), the Prince Bishop river cruiser and other watersports (e.g. canoeing and Dragon Boat Racing) all within a 2.5 km stretch. To manage this congestion safely, DCR represents college clubs at Durham University Rowing Board, and in turn implements and enforces the regulations as set out by the Board.

DCR is led by the Captain of Colleges, who represents college rowers at a university and regional level, supported by a wider exec including secretary, press officer, Water Safety Officer and Treasurer. The regatta secretary sits on the executive committee and also leads the regatta committee, who are responsible for DCR competitions.

== Inter-collegiate races ==
Durham College Rowing organises several regattas and head races each year.

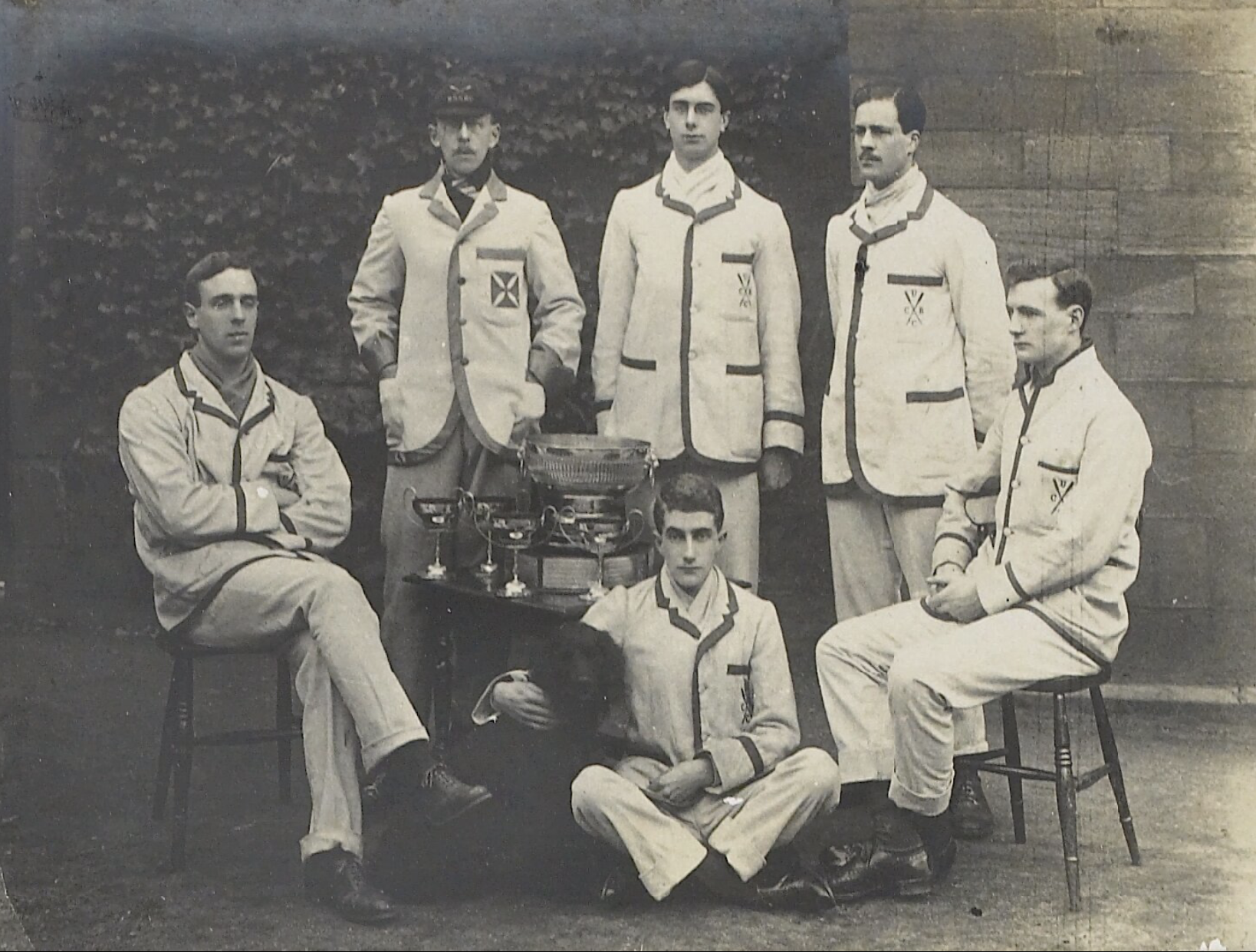
1912 University College Senate Cup winning crew, with trophies and a dog (sitting front left)

- Novice Cup – a coxed IV regatta held in the first term for new rowers. This was known as the Hatfield Cup until 2003, when Durham College Rowing took over the organising of the event.
- Novice Head – a 1.8 km upstream head race for novice coxed IVs.
- Senate Cup – a regatta for men's and women's coxed IVs. This intercollegiate event on the Wear in Durham has been running for well over a hundred years; with interruptions due to poor weather, the First World War, the Second World War and the COVID-19 pandemic.
- Senate Head – a 1.8 km upstream head race for experienced coxed IVs.
- Admiral's Regatta – a summer regatta; generally the final rowing event for the academic year.

Discontinued races that DCR supported included:

- Pennant Series – a series of long and short course events in Durham city in Epiphany Term.
- The Hayward Cup – a 4 km head race on the river Tees, organised by Stephenson College Boat Club and John Snow College Boat Club. The event was discontinued when the university consolidated all colleges into Durham city.
- Butler Head – a 1.8 km upstream head race on the Durham long course, organised by Butler College Boat Club.

Durham College Rowing is a member of Durham University Rowing Board, and supports the organisation of Durham Regatta together with Durham Amateur Rowing Club, Durham University Boat Club and Durham School Boat Club.

== Structure of rowing in Durham University ==
Rowers, scullers and coxes in Durham University can usually be categorised as "college rowers" (members of college boat clubs) or "university rowers" (members of Durham University Boat Club).

Durham College Rowing represents the college boat clubs on Durham University Rowing Board (commonly abbreviated to DURB), which oversees all rowing activities by members of Durham University. DURB aims to provide a safe environment in which rowing can take place within Durham University and promote health and safety within the sport at all levels.

Durham College Rowing organises Senate Boat Club, a high performance squad that brings together rowers from colleges, who do not wish to be part of Durham University Boat Club. In 2023–24, Senate Boat Club sent crews to BUCS Head and Henley Women's Regatta.

== Clubs ==
DCR clubs operate from 11 separate boathouses along the navigable length of the River Wear in Durham.

The following are the college rowing clubs in Durham on the River Wear, with their blade colours, and British Rowing codes:

Blade	Club (code)
Butler College Boat Club: burgundy with athletic gold cross	Butler College Boat Club (BTL)
Collingwood College Boat Club: black and red with white diagonal	Collingwood College Boat Club (COC)
Grey College Boat Club: red with white, black and white band	Grey College Boat Club (GRC)
Hatfield College Boat Club: Oxford blue with white lion	Hatfield College Boat Club (HAT)
Hild Bede Boat Club: light blue with two dark blue chevrons	Hild Bede Boat Club (SHB)
John Snow Boat Club: white with gold crest	John Snow College Boat Club (JSC)
South College Boat Club: white with a violet, grey and teal stripe	South College Boat Club (SHC)
St Aidan's College Boat Club: green with white/red/white chevrons	St Aidan's College Boat Club (AID)
St Chad's College Boat Club: white cross potent on hedgerow green	St Chad's College Boat Club (SCH)
St Cuthbert's Society Boat Club: dark green with white chevron	St Cuthbert's Society Boat Club (SCB)
St John's College Boat Club: saxe blue	St John's College Boat Club (SJC)
St Mary's College Boat Club: purple	St Mary's College Boat Club (SMC)
George Stephenson College Boat Club: red with white tip and chevron	Stephenson College Boat Club (GSC)
Trevelyan College Boat Club: turquoise with black logo	Trevelyan College Boat Club (TRV)
University College Boat Club: cardinal with a white chevron	University College Boat Club (UCD)
Van Mildert Boat Club: primrose yellow	Van Mildert Boat Club (VAN)

Ustinov College, Durham, a graduate only college, also has a boat club: Ustinov Boat Club; but membership has been low and the club's membership of British Rowing and DCR has lapsed.

Blade	Club
Ustinov Boat Club: White with black trim	Ustinov Boat Club (UST)

Durham University has its own boat club:

Blade	Club
Durham University Boat Club: palatinate	Durham University Boat Club (DUB)

== See also ==
- Colleges of Durham University
- List of rowing clubs on the River Wear
- List of social activities at Durham University
- Team Durham
- University rowing in the United Kingdom
