= Jack Cattell =

The Ven. Jack Cattell was Archdeacon of Bermuda from 1961 until 1982.

He was educated at Durham University and Salisbury Theological College; and ordained in 1940. He was President of the Durham Union for Epiphany term of 1938. After a curacy in Royston he was a Chaplain to the British Armed Forces from 1942 to 1946. He was also a teacher: serving at Dauntsey's School, Richmond School and Wanstead High School. He was Head teacher of Whitney Institute from 1953 until his appointment as Archdeacon.

Church of England titles
Preceded by John Waters Stow	Archdeacon of Bermuda	Succeeded by Thomas Dyson
