= HCBC =

HCBC may refer to:

- Hatfield College Boat Club, a rowing club at the University of Durham, England
- Hertford College Boat Club, a rowing club at the University of Oxford, England
- Homerton College Boat Club, a rowing club at the University of Cambridge, England
