= Trevelyan College Boat Club =

British rowing club

- Location: Clive's Boathouse, Durham
- Coordinates: 54.772958°N 1.557939°W
- Home water: River Wear
- Founded: 1976; 50 years ago
- Affiliations: Amateur Rowing Association, Trevelyan College, Durham University, Durham College Rowing
- Website: https://community.dur.ac.uk/trevelyan-boat.club/home.html https://www.instagram.com/trevelyancollegebc/ https://www.facebook.com/TrevelyanCollegeBC/

Trevelyan College Boat Club (TCBC) is the boat club of Trevelyan College, at Durham University in England. An active north eastern rowing club, it competes on a national level, for example at Henley Royal Regatta and the Head of the River Race. The club runs under the leadership of a structured executive committee and benefits from an annual intake of around thirty novice rowers each year. The club was founded officially in 1976, although there was a history of rowing at the college earlier, with the first boat bought in 1966. It is recorded that an all fresher crew won the Ladies Invitation Race at the university Epiphany Term regatta in 1967.

TCBC is a registered Boat Club through British Rowing, with Boat Code "TRV" and is a member organisation of Durham College Rowing.

The alumni club for ex-TCBC members is the Drowning Horse Boat Club, a humorous play on Trevelyan College's Coat of Arms.

== Boathouse and facilities ==
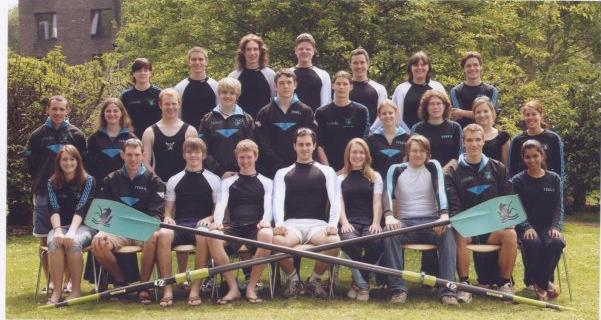
Trevelyan College Boat Club 2006–07.

The club is currently housed opposite Durham Amateur Rowing Club east of the city centre and upstream of the 750m racecourse, in a boathouse shared by St Mary's College Boat Club, St John's College Boat Club and Durham Amateur Rowing Club.

In the past the club has been housed at Hatfield College's Boathouse.

The club's fleet includes:

- One Filippi 8+
- Five 4+ ( Including 1 bow loader and 1 wooden boat)
- One double
- Two singles

== Executive committee ==
The club is run under a structured executive that is elected at the AGM of the boat club, run at the end of epiphany term. The social secretaries of the boat club organise the annual boat club ball held in easter term; "Bash on the Bish" (sometimes titled 'Gash on the Bish' and 'Lashy on the Bishy'), which is held on the Prince Bishop river boat.

== Recent history ==
TCBC at the Women's Head of the River Race 2007.

1st 4+ at Henley Royal Regatta 2008.

In 2007, the club won the S4 4+ category at the Rutherford Head on the River Tyne, and the Tees Small Boats Head in the S3 4+ Category. In inter-colliegiate events the club won the Senate Cup.

In 2008, the success of the boat club resulted in members being chosen along with members of St Cuthbert's Society to represent the university in the Junior 8+ category at BUSA Regatta in Glasgow. At the same time a crew composed entire of Trevelyan rowers competed as the University in the Junior 4+ category, where they won a bronze medal. That year the club also won Durham Small Boats Head S4 4+ category, won the Chester-le-Street Regatta WN 4+ category, and lost in the final of Durham Regatta in the S4, S3 and S2 4+ categories, in composite crews with Ustinov and Van Mildert Colleges. The club also won the Dyfrig Williams Trophy for the fastest men's 4+ overall in the University Pennant Series.

In 2008, the men's first 4+ qualified for the Prince Albert Challenge Cup at Henley Royal Regatta.

TCBC 1st 4+ at Durham Small Boats Head 2008.

In 2009, it was decided that the club had been too long without owning any 8+s, previously the club would train in 8+s owned by Josephine Butler College. The club now owns two 8+s. 2009 also saw TCBC win the 4+ category in the Butler College Novice Head of the River race, at the same time setting the fastest time record for any category.

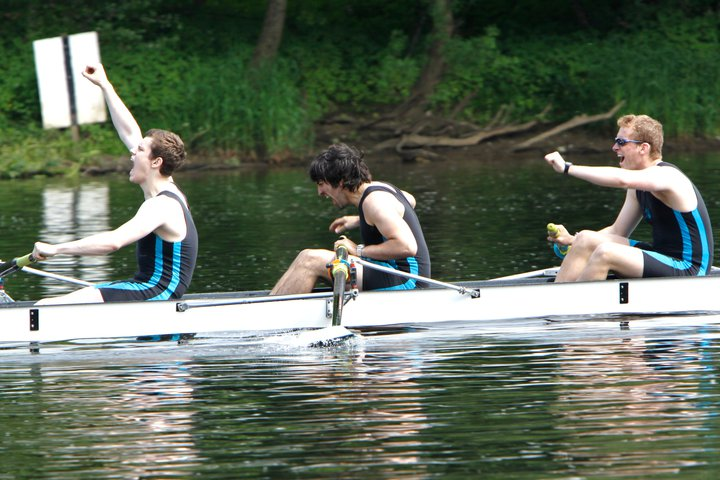
TCBC at Hexham Regatta 2010 – Novice IV+ Champions

In summer 2010, the clubs novice men's four won Hexham Regatta. In 2010–11 TCBC club entered many head races starting with The Fuller's Head of the River Fours. The Men's 4+ won the Senate Cup Intercollegiate Race regaining the trophy from when the college was last victorious in 2007. The regatta season saw a victory at Durham City Regatta in a Novice Double, a series of successful races saw the 1st four advance to the final of Durham Regatta, but a clash of blades in the opponent's lane in the first part of the race saw the four disqualified, even though they finished two lengths ahead of the opponent.

In 2022, the club saw a return from the COVID-19 pandemic. Highlights include TCBC women placing 128 at the Women's Eights Head of the River Race and the men placing 148 and claiming the Small Academic Club pennant at the Head of the River Race. The women also represented Durham University in BUCS Regatta held at Holme Pierrepoint and progressed through the time trial to place 2nd in the F final.

In 2024 the men's 8+ competed at the Head of the River Race and were the winner of the Small Academic Pennant, placing 157 overall and 52 among university crews.

== Notable members ==
- Diana Preston, GB Rower, 1971–72
- Sophie Hosking, GB Rower, 2006–12

== See also ==
- University rowing (UK)
- List of rowing clubs on the River Wear
