= St John's College Boat Club =

St John's College Boat Club may refer to:

- St John's College Boat Club (Durham)
- St John's College Boat Club (Oxford)
