= Hild Bede Boat Club =

British rowing club

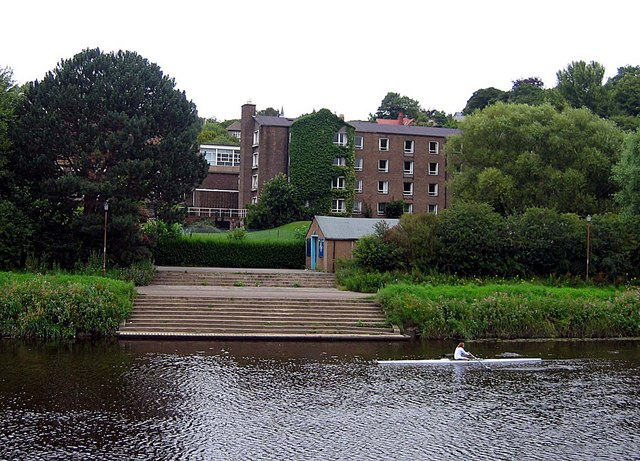

- Location: Durham, England
- Coordinates: 54.776383°N 1.565420°W
- Home water: River Wear
- Affiliations: British Rowing

Hild Bede Boat Club (HBBC) is the rowing club of the College of St Hild and St Bede at Durham University on the River Wear in England.

The club is based from its own boathouse, next to the college, on the north bank of the regatta stretch.

HBBC is a registered Boat Club through British Rowing, with Boat Code "SHB" and is a member organisation of Durham College Rowing.

The club has reached the highest level in the sport, qualifying for Henley Royal Regatta multiple times: for the second round in the Temple Challenge Cup in 2010, and the first round in 2011, and 2015; and also qualified for the first round of the Prince Albert Challenge Cup in 2012, and 2016. The club has competed overseas at the Head of the Charles, in Boston, USA in 1998, 1999, 2000, 2003 and 2006.

In Durham, the club is a regular participant at Durham Regatta, races across the north east such as Tyne Head and Hexham Regatta, and Durham College Rowing events.

In 2025 the club was the first in the modern era to complete the recently brought back Derwentwater Head in under ten minutes. They still hold the course record in the 4+.

== See also ==
- University rowing (UK)
- List of rowing clubs on the River Wear
