= Thomas Dyson =

The Ven. Thomas Dyson was Archdeacon of Bermuda from 1982 until 1994.

Dyson was educated at the University of Manchester and ordained in 1940. After a curacy at St Anselm's, Kennington he was a Chaplain in the RNVR from 1943 to 1947. He was Vicar of St Peter-in-the-East, Oxford from 1947 to 1955; and Rector of St Bartholemew, Colne, Lancashire from 1955 to 1957 when he became the incumbent in Warwick, Bermuda.

Church of England titles
Preceded by Jack Cattell	Archdeacon of Bermuda; 1982–94	Succeeded by Ewen Ratteray
