= Alice Freeman =

British rower

Personal information
- Born: 6 September 1978 (age 47) Oxford, England, UK
Medal record
Women's rowing
Representing Great Britain
World Championships
Bronze medal – third place	2007 Munich	Eight
European Championships
Bronze medal – third place	2007 Poznań	Eight

Alice Freeman (born 6 September 1978 in Oxford) is a British retired rower.

== Early life and education ==
Freeman studied at Durham University, where she learnt to row at the Hatfield College Boat Club, eventually progressing to the development squad of the university club.

After a period working in South Africa, she continued her education by studying for a PGCE at St Edmund Hall, Oxford, and was a member of the winning Oxford boat in the 2004 Women's Boat Race.

Freeman worked as a maths teacher following university.

== Rowing career ==
Freeman was part of the British crews that won bronze medals in the women's eight at both the World Rowing Championships and European Rowing Championships in 2007. She was originally selected for the 2008 Summer Olympics as a spare, but was promoted for the final when a teammate was unable to compete due to illness. She finished 5th in the women's eight.
