= List of rowing clubs on the River Wear =

The River Wear is home to a number of sports rowing clubs. These clubs are based in Durham, Chester-le-Street and Sunderland. All clubs are members of British Rowing and all the Durham College clubs are members of Durham College Rowing.

== Durham ==
In Durham, there are 23 clubs based on the river, with 18 from Durham University, three school clubs, one police force and one public club.

Club	Blade colours	Boat code
Butler College Boat Club		BTL
Collingwood College Boat Club		COC
Durham Amateur Rowing Club		DUR
Durham Constabulary Rowing Club		DMC
Durham High School for Girls	Blue blade with gold chevron	DUH
Durham School Boat Club		DUS
Durham University Boat Club		DUB
Grey College Boat Club		GRC
Hatfield College Boat Club		HAT
Hild Bede Boat Club		SHB
John Snow College Boat Club		JSC
South College Boat Club		SOU
St Aidan's College Boat Club		AID
St Chad's College Boat Club		SCH
St Cuthbert's Society Boat Club		SCB
St John's College Boat Club		SJC
St Leonard's School Boat Club		SLS
St Mary's College Boat Club		SMC
Stephenson College Boat Club		GSC
Trevelyan College Boat Club		TRV
University College Boat Club		UCD
Ustinov Boat Club		UST
Van Mildert Boat Club		VAN
Senate Boat Club		

== Chester-le-Street ==
In Chester-le-Street there is one club on the river:

Club	Blade colours	Boat code
Chester-le-Street Amateur Rowing Club		CLS

== Sunderland ==
In Sunderland there are two rowing clubs:

Club	Blade colours	Boat code
Sunderland City Rowing Club	Light blue blade with dark blue tip	CSN
Sunderland University Rowing Club	Blue blade with gold tip	USN

== See also ==
- Durham College Rowing
