= Lumley Lough =

The Ven. John Francis Burnaby Lumley Lough (14 April 1832 - 20 March 1896) was Archdeacon of Bermuda from 1876 until his death.

He was ordained in 1855 and was Rector of Paget and Warwick parishes until his appointment as Archdeacon.

Church of England titles
Preceded by Edward Feild	Archdeacon of Bermuda	Succeeded by George Tucker
