= John Stow (priest) =

Archdeacon of Bermuda

The Ven. John Waters Stow, MA (17 January 1912 – 3 July 1971) was Archdeacon of Bermuda from 1951 until 1961.

He was educated at Selwyn College, Cambridge, and Ripon College Cuddesdon; and ordained in 1938. After a curacy in East Wickham he was a Chaplain in the RNVR from 1939 to 1944 when he moved to Portsmouth to serve a second curacy at St Mary, Portsea. He was Rector of St. George, Bermuda from 1947 to 1961; and then of Hatfield until his death.

Church of England titles
Preceded by Henry Marriott	Archdeacon of Bermuda	Succeeded by Jack Cattell
