= John Snow College Boat Club =

British rowing club

John Snow Boat Club
- Motto: Latin: Per scientiam et prudentiam quaere summam
- Location: Durham, England
- Coordinates: 54.768648°N 1.558919°W
- Home water: River Wear
- Founded: 2001; 25 years ago
- Affiliations: British Rowing
- Website: www.instagram.com/john_snow_boat_club/

John Snow College Boat Club (JSCBC) is the rowing club of John Snow College, Durham at Durham University on the River Wear in England.

JSCBC is a registered Boat Club through British Rowing, with Boat Code "JSC" and is a member organisation of Durham College Rowing.

In Durham, the club is a regular participant at Durham Regatta, races across the north east, the Women's Eights Head of the River Race in London and Durham College Rowing events.

== History ==
Until 2017, the club was based on the River Tees at the River Tees Watersport Centre, in Stockton-on-Tees.

Since 2017, the club has been based on the River Wear in Durham City.

== See also ==
- University rowing (UK)
- List of rowing clubs on the River Wear
