= Wade Hall-Craggs =

British rower (born 1966)

Personal information
- Born: Oliver Wade Hall-Craggs; 9 January 1966 (age 60) Newbury, West Berkshire, England

Sport
- Country: United Kingdom
- Sport: Rowing

Oliver Wade Hall-Craggs (born 9 January 1966) is a British rower and Olympic sculler.

He represented Great Britain in the single scull event at the 1992 Summer Olympics. Between 2000 and 2021, he served as head coach at Durham University Boat Club, mainly coaching the heavyweight men. He is now coaching at St Peter's College, Adelaide, Australia's leading school rowing program and the winners of the 2021 Barrington Cup.

Hall-Craggs read archaeology at Grey College, Durham, from 1985 to 1988.
