= St Chad's College Boat Club =

British rowing club

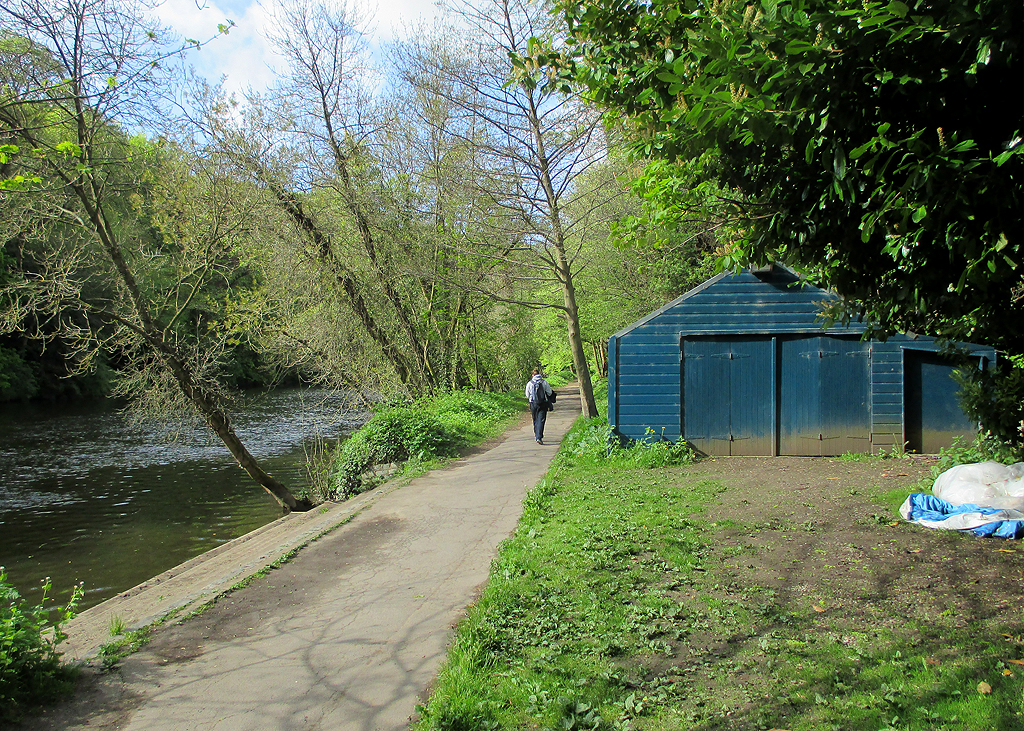

- Motto: Latin: Non vestra sed vos
- Location: Durham, England
- Coordinates: 54.771519°N 1.574545°W
- Home water: River Wear
- Founded: 1906; 120 years ago
- Affiliations: British Rowing
- Website: www.stchads.ac.uk/college/common-rooms/jcr/sport/boat-club/

St Chad's College Boat Club (SCCBC) is the rowing club of St Chad's College at Durham University on the River Wear in England.

SCCBC is a registered Boat Club through British Rowing with the boat code 'SCH' and is a member organisation of Durham College Rowing.

In Durham, the club is a regular participant at Durham Regatta, races across the north east, Durham College Rowing events, the Head of the River Race in London and occasional charity events.

The college's boat house is located on college-owned land on the banks of the River Wear, below the college's original home at 1 South Bailey, now part of St John's College. In 2016, the boat house and landing stage were completely replaced.

== 1911 Fatality ==
On Friday 24 February 1911, a crew from St Chad's Hall began to take on water during poor weather (not regarded by the club as a reason to panic in itself) but became increasingly submerged – and soon 'completely swamped' – after the nervous crew, while trying to 'get her out of it', swerved the boat with badly timed strokes. Two students, Lionel Michelsen and Jesse Parsons (neither of whom could properly swim), got into difficulties after trying to swim to the shore at Pelaw Wood. Michelsen was rescued by the coach of a nearby Hatfield crew, while Parsons died in the incident, with other students either swimming to shore or picked up in the water by a passing St John's boat.

== See also ==
- University rowing (UK)
- List of rowing clubs on the River Wear
