= George Tucker (priest) =

The Ven. George Tucker (1 November 1835 – 6 April 1908) was an archdeacon of Bermuda from 1896 until 1908.

He was educated at Yale College and ordained in 1861. After a curacy at gap Notre Dame Bay he was Rector of St Mark, Smith's Parish, Bermuda until his appointment as Archdeacon. A set of bells at St Mark commemorate his long service.

Church of England titles
Preceded by John Francis Burnaby Lumley Lough	Archdeacon of Bermuda	Succeeded by James Davidson
