= James Davidson (priest) =

The Ven. James Davidson was Archdeacon of Bermuda from 1909 until 1924.

He was educated at Durham University and ordained deacon in 1887 and priest in 1888. After a curacy in Bedlington he was Rector of Pembroke then Devonshire (both in Bermuda). During World War I he was a Chaplain to the Forces.

He died on 5 December 1933.

Church of England titles
Preceded by George Tucker	Archdeacon of Bermuda	Succeeded by Henry Marriott
