= Stephenson College Boat Club =

British rowing club

- Motto: Latin: Me quondam mirabitur orbis
- Location: Durham, England
- Coordinates: 54.768648°N 1.558919°W
- Home water: River Wear
- Founded: 2001; 25 years ago
- Affiliations: British Rowing
- Website: https://www.instagram.com/stephensoncollegebc/

Stephenson College Boat Club (SCBC) is the rowing club of Stephenson College, Durham at Durham University on the River Wear in England.

GSCBC is a registered Boat Club through British Rowing, with Boat Code "GSC" and is a member organisation of Durham College Rowing.

In Durham, the club is a regular participant at Durham Regatta, races across the north east, the Head of the River Race in London and Durham College Rowing events.

== History ==
Between 2001 and 2006, the club was known as George Stephenson College Boat Club, and that legacy name is still reflected in the British Rowing boat code "GSC". Until 2017, the club was based on the River Tees at the River Tees Watersport Centre, in Stockton-on-Tees.

Since 2017, the club has been based on the River Wear in Durham City.

== See also ==
- University rowing (UK)
- List of rowing clubs on the River Wear
