= Henry Marriott =

Archdeacon of Bermuda (1925–1951)

The Ven. Henry Marriott (17 July 1870 – 11 April 1952) was an Anglican priest who served as Archdeacon of Bermuda from 1925 to 1951.

Born in London, his father was originally from St John's, Newfoundland. He attended Bishop Feild College in St John's and continued his education at St Augustine's College, Canterbury and Hatfield College, Durham. He was ordained in 1895.

Following curacies in Topsail, Newfoundland and Labrador and Hamilton, Bermuda, he was commissioner of the Diocese of Newfoundland and Bermuda prior to his appointment as Archdeacon.

His son, Henry J. L. Marriott, became a cardiologist noted for his work on electrocardiography.

Church of England titles
Preceded by James Davidson	Archdeacon of Bermuda	Succeeded by John Waters Stow
