= Simon Barr =

German rower

Personal information
- Born: 12 September 1985 (age 40)

Sport
- Sport: Rowing
Medal record
Men's rowing
Representing Germany
World Rowing Championships
Gold medal – first place	2014 Amsterdam	Lwt eight
Gold medal – first place	2015 Aiguebelette	Lwt eight

Simon Barr (born 12 September 1985) is a German lightweight rower.

Barr was educated at Eastbourne College, where he was introduced to rowing. He studied Chemistry at Durham University and competed in lightweight rowing with the Durham University Boat Club. He represented Great Britain at the 2006 World University Rowing Championships.

Later switching nationality to Germany, he won the gold medal at the 2014 World Rowing Championships in Amsterdam with the lightweight men's eight.
