= St Mary's College Boat Club =

British rowing club

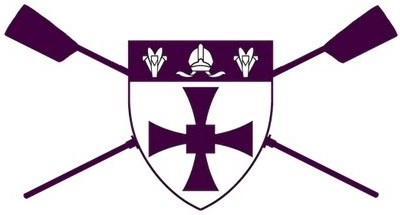

- Location: Clive's Boat House
- Coordinates: 54.772958°N 1.557939°W
- Home water: River Wear, Durham
- Founded: 1926
- Membership: 40
- Affiliations: British Rowing, St Mary's College

St Mary's College Boat Club (SMCBC) is the rowing club of St Mary's College at Durham University in the North East of England.

The club has over 40 members and uses Clive’s Boat House on the banks of the River Wear. The club is a participant at Durham Regatta, races across the north east, and Durham College Rowing events.

SMBC is a registered Boat Club through British Rowing, with Boat Code "SMC" and is a member organisation of Durham College Rowing.

== Membership and Structure ==
Members are taken from the students at St Mary's College and any member of the JCR or MCR are allowed to join. Any other members of Durham University are permitted to join with the permission of the current President.

A subscription fee is charged by the club, and this goes towards the upkeep of boats, payment for trailering and the purchase of spare parts.

The club is run by an executive committee, elected in the final few weeks of the Epiphany term. The committee runs the club for one year and is responsible for every aspect of the club. The club is currently sponsored by St Mary's College Society, North East Rowing and Linklaters.

== Competitions ==
The club competes in both head races in the winter season and regattas throughout the summer. The club has competed in the following events in the past few years.

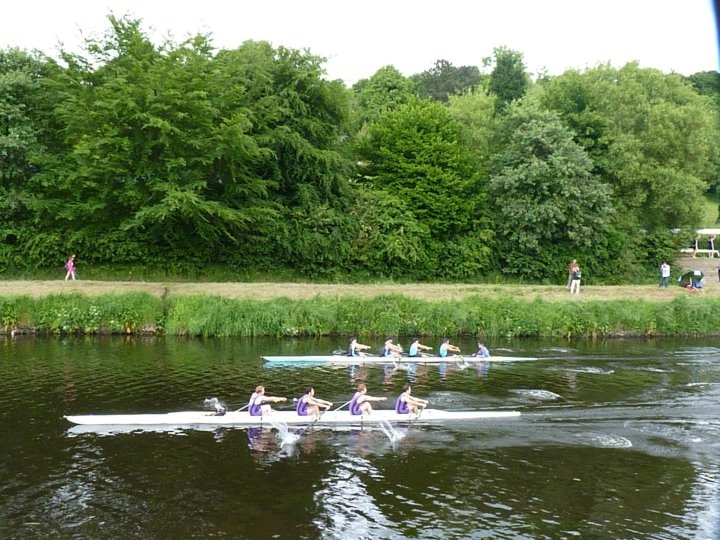
SMCBC Men's 1st IV against Hild Bede Boat Club at Durham Regatta 2011

National events

- The Head of the River Race
- Women's Head of the River Race

Regional events

- Durham Regatta
- Durham City Regatta
- Durham Small Boats Head
- Hexham Regatta
- Rutherford Head
- Tyne Head
- York Regatta
- York Small Boats Head

College events

- Novice Cup
- Senate Cup
- Admirals Regatta

== Fleet ==
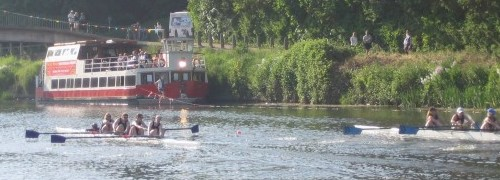
SMCBC Women's 1st IV (left) racing on the River Wear

The Club owns one eight (8+) (Philly G), five coxed fours (4+) (Graham Booth, Nicky, Purple Haze, Femme Fatale and Mary Rose) and one double scull (2x) (Tigger).

Both the Men's and Women's 1st VIIIs train and compete in Philly G, whilst the Men's and Women's 1st and 2nd IVs train and race mainly in Graham Booth and Nicky. The remaining 4+s are used by the rest of the Men's and Women's squads to train and race in. The club's double scull, Tigger, can be rented out by other clubs by agreement with SMCBC's President.

== See also ==
- University rowing (UK)
- List of rowing clubs on the River Wear
