= Durham University Boat Club =

British rowing club

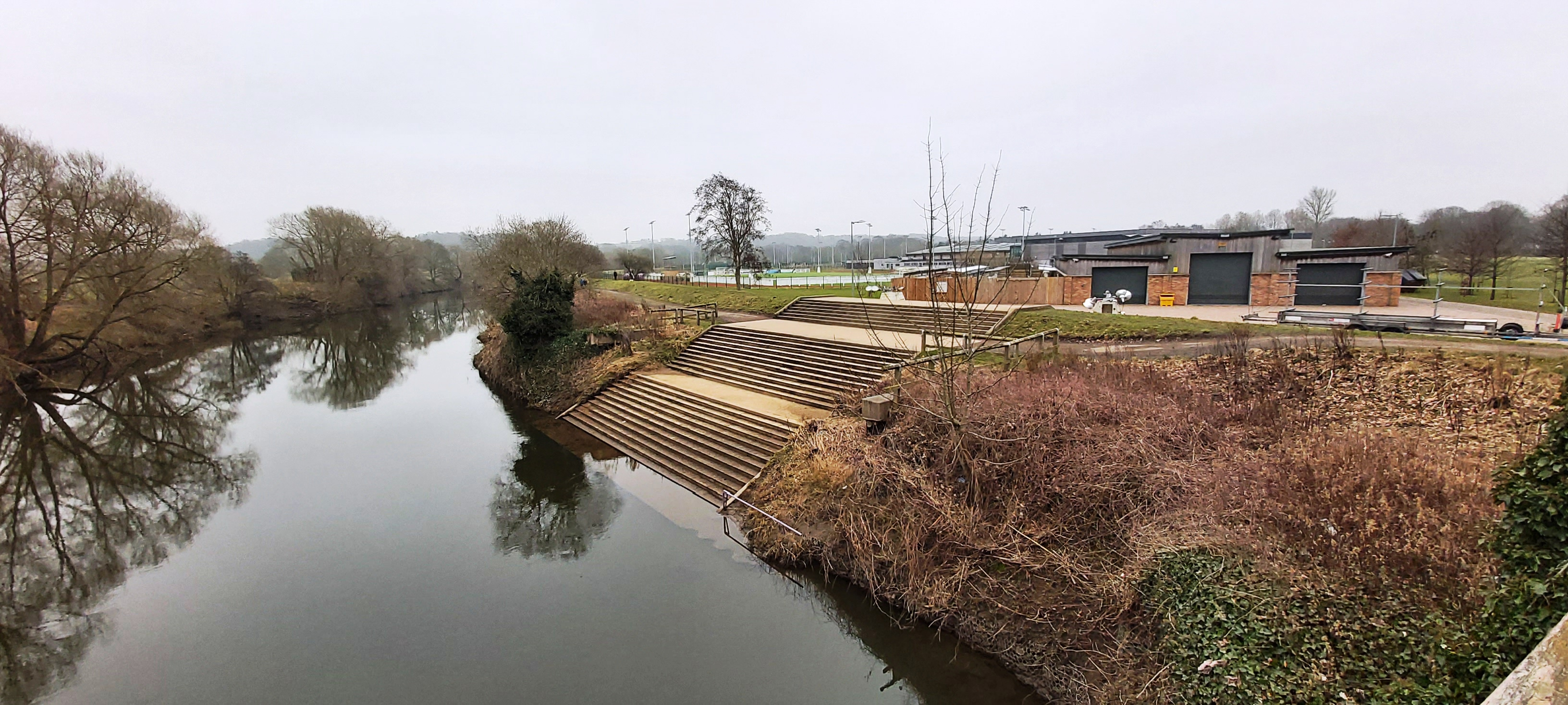

- Location: Robert Gillespie Boathouse, Maiden Castle, Durham & Tyne United RC, Gateshead
- Home water: River Wear, River Tyne
- Founded: 1877
- Affiliations: British Rowing boat code DUB; BUCS
- Website: dubc.co.uk

Events
- Boat Race of the North, Winter Challenge Cup, North East Indoor Rowing Championships

Notable members
- William Fletcher, Stephen Rowbotham, James Clarke, Dr Paul Hawkins, Jock Wishart, Louisa Reeve, Roger Brown, Sophie Hosking, Angus Groom. Chris Huey, Wade Hall-Craggs

Durham University Boat Club
Medal record

Rowing

Olympic Games

Representing Great Britain
Gold medal – first place	2012	LW2x Sophie Hosking
Bronze medal – third place	2008	M2x Stephen Rowbotham

Paralympic Games

Representing Great Britain
Gold medal – first place	2012	LTAMix4+ Lily van den Broecke

World Championships

Representing Great Britain
Bronze medal – third place	2019	M4- Matthew Rossiter
Bronze medal – third place	2017	M4- Matthew Rossiter
Gold medal – first place	2016	M2+ Callum McBrierty
Silver medal – second place	2015	LM2x Will Fletcher
Silver medal – second place	2015	W4- Lucinda Gooderham
Bronze medal – third place	2015	M4- Stewart Innes
Gold medal – first place	2011	LM2- Kieren Emery
Bronze medal – third place	2011	LW2x Sophie Hosking
Bronze medal – third place	2011	W8+ Lindsey Maguire
Bronze medal – third place	2011	W8+ Louisa Reeve
Silver medal – second place	2010	M8+ James Clarke
Bronze medal – third place	2009	LW2x Sophie Hosking
Gold medal – first place	2007	LM4- James Clarke
Silver medal – second place	2007	LW4x Sophie Hosking
Bronze medal – third place	2007	W8+ Alice Freeman
Bronze medal – third place	2007	W8+ Louisa Reeve
Silver medal – second place	2006	M2x Stephen Rowbotham
Bronze medal – third place	2006	LW4x Sophie Hosking
Bronze medal – third place	2005	LW4x Naomi Hoogesteger
Silver medal – second place	2003	M4+ Peter Rudge
Bronze medal – third place	2002	LW2x Tracy Langlands
Bronze medal – third place	2001	M4+ Peter Rudge
Gold medal – first place	2000	LW2- Malindi Myers
Silver medal – second place	1999	LW2- Malindi Myers
Bronze medal – third place	1997	W8+ Suzie Ellis
Bronze medal – third place	1997	LW2- Malindi Myers
Silver medal – second place	1996	LW4- Malindi Myers
Silver medal – second place	1995	LM8+ Andy Butt
Silver medal – second place	1992	LM8+ Andy Butt
Gold medal – first place	1980	LM8+ Colin Barratt
Gold medal – first place	1980	LM8+ David Hosking
Gold medal – first place	1979	LM4- Colin Barratt

Representing Germany
Gold medal – first place	2015	LM8+ Simon Barr
Gold medal – first place	2014	LM8+ Simon Barr

Durham University Boat Club (DUBC) is the rowing club of Durham University. In recent years, DUBC has cemented itself as one of the strongest university boat clubs in Great Britain. Under the leadership of former British Olympian Wade Hall-Craggs, DUBC notably won the BUCS Victor Ludorum for ten consecutive years (2004-2013), and has produced a number of athletes that have competed internationally at European and World Championship level.

Based at the Robert Gillespie Boat House on the River Wear, the club also operates facilities from the adjacent Graham Sports Centre at Maiden Castle, including a powered indoor rowing tank (one of only three in the country at the time it opened) and a gallery of 28 ergometers. It competes annually at all major British rowing events, including the Head of the River Race, Henley Royal Regatta and Henley Women's Regatta, and contests the Boat Race of the North with Newcastle University Boat Club.

Rowing at Durham University is divided into the college boat clubs and the more advanced university crews arranged by DUBC, with intercollegiate events overseen by Durham College Rowing. In common with other university sides, the team's colour is Palatinate, said to derive from that worn by the armies of the medieval Prince-Bishop of Durham. (Note: Alternatively, C.E. Whiting suggests in his centenary history of the University that it was likely based on a coat worn by Bishop Van Mildert, founder of the University.)

== History ==
=== 19th century ===
Rowing in Durham was said to be 'practically contemporaneous with the founding of the University', with boat crews competing in the Durham Regatta since its foundation in 1834. When the Grand Challenge Cup (for coxed Fours) was introduced in 1854 it was won seven times by crews from University College before 1862, with teams from rival Hatfield Hall typically coming up short. (Note: Hatfield's only 'star performer' during the 1850s was Charles Clinton Chevallier (1834-1884), nephew of Temple Chevallier (Director of Durham University Observatory). As a former pupil of Durham School he would have been highly familiar with the river.) However, the founding of Durham Amateur Rowing Club and increased entries from further afield would eventually bring an end to University College's dominance. Entries for competitive races around this time could be fairly casual, and often formed by scratch teams rowing under the name of the boat and not the collegiate body to which they belonged, making it somewhat difficult to successfully identify college crews in the early records.

Although the University College Boat Club (1834) and Hatfield College Boat Club (1846) had been established soon after the founding of their respective colleges, Durham University Boat Club (DUBC) was only formally founded in 1877 'to produce representative student crews and to act as the controlling body' for various clubs already active.

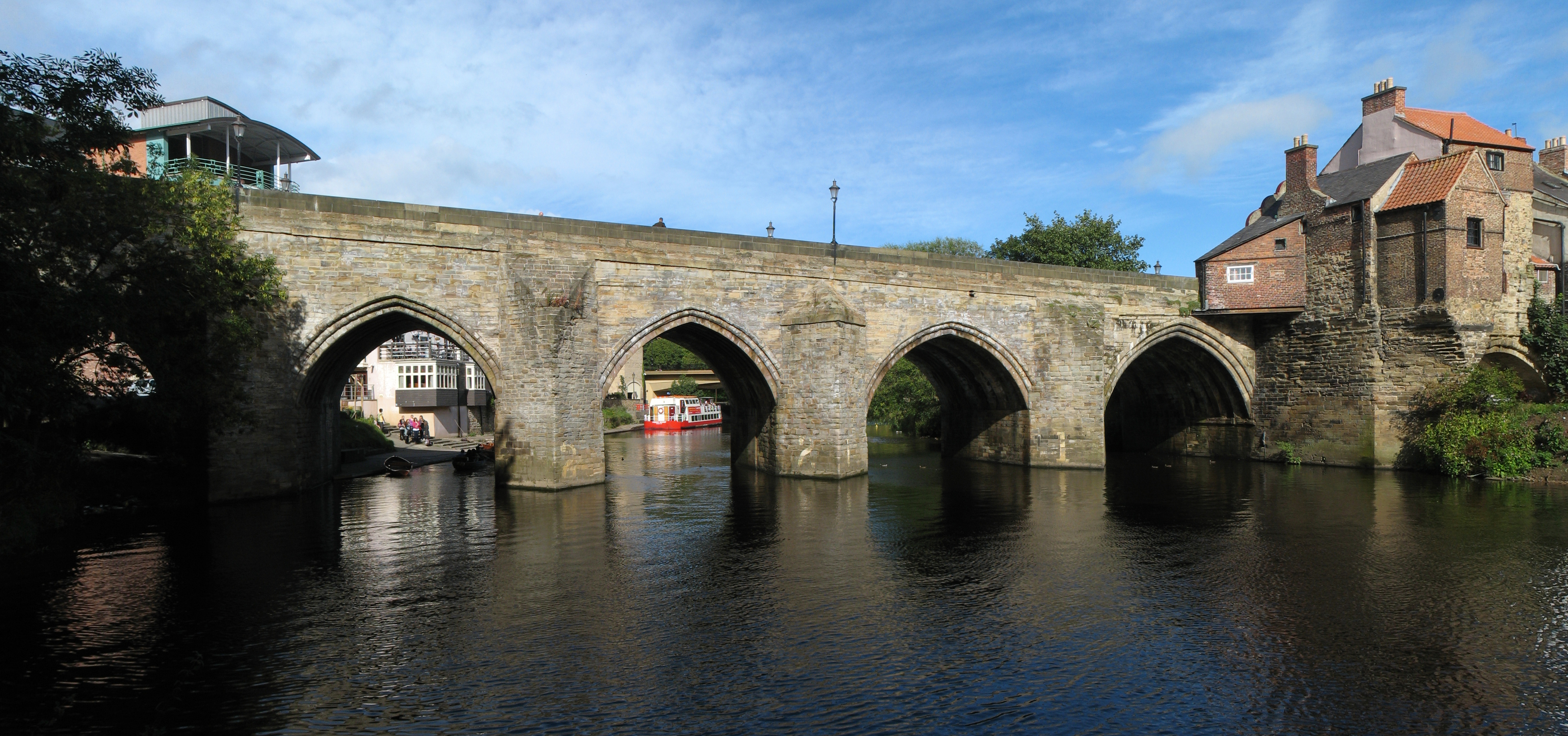
Elvet Bridge

The course that Durham has always used for competitive racing is unusual. The 15th century Elvet Bridge, which has rather narrow arches for rowing, is half way down the long course. The sharp bend of the river, in combination with the bridge, makes Durham one of the hardest courses in the country to steer.

From 1887–1893, the University held a Regatta separately from the Durham Regatta, which it declined to enter. At this time rowing, as the oldest sport in the university, was regarded as 'first in order of precedence' largely because of the weight of tradition behind it. In 1888, in the aftermath of the Senate Challenge Cup (essentially the University Regatta), which was won by Hatfield, rowers celebrated the finale of the event with a torchlight procession through Durham – headed by the Durham Town Band, 60 students marched through the streets, each man carrying a flaming torch as they made their way to Market Place, twice rounded the monument to the 3rd Marquess of Londonderry and then went up to Palace Green, where the torches were extinguished. The university soon returned to success at the Durham Regatta, again winning the Grand Challenge Cup in 1895 and 1898.

=== 1900 to 1963 ===
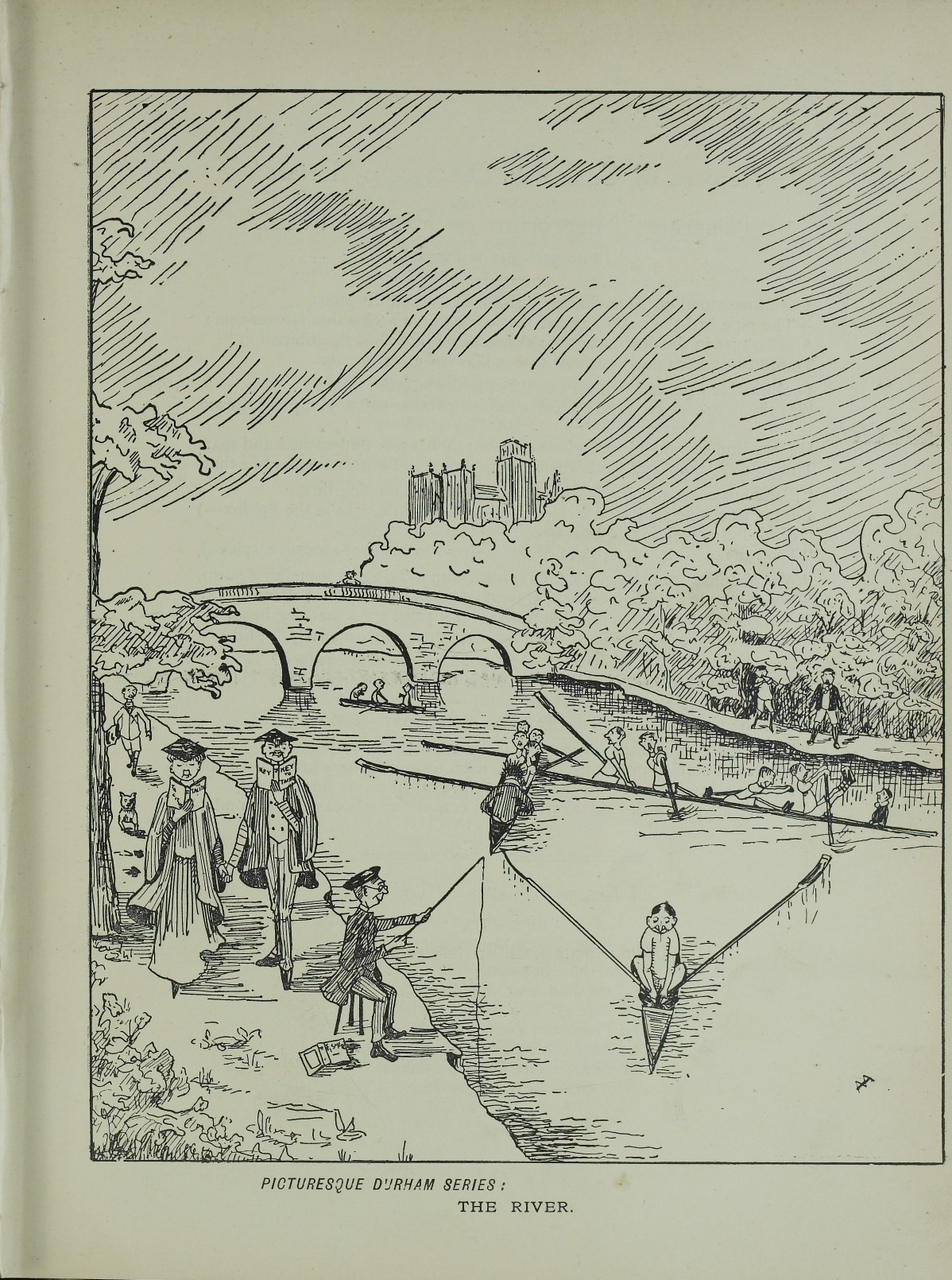
A 1906 cartoon from student magazine 'The Sphinx' shows college rowers by Prebends Bridge

In 1904, with attempts to stage an annual event with Trinity College Dublin unsuccessful, an inter-Varsity race for Fours against Edinburgh University, intended to be held every June, was instituted instead; by 1924 this had been competed for 14 times. Torpids were also held home and away against Edinburgh in December, and a race against Leeds University Boat Club is recorded in 1924. Rowing spread to the Newcastle division of the University in 1911 with the foundation of the Armstrong College Boat Club.

For many years after its foundation, being unable to swim was not considered a disqualifier for membership of the club, with the oars strung in the rowlocks thought to provide 'sufficient buoyancy to keep a boat afloat' even with a crew clinging on. This was only changed in the aftermath of a rowing accident on 24 February 1911 in which a crew from St Chad's Hall began to take on a bit of water during poor weather (not regarded by the club as a reason to panic in itself) but became increasingly submerged – and soon 'completely swamped' – after the nervous crew, while trying to 'get her out of it', swerved the boat with badly timed strokes. Two students, Lionel Michelsen and Jesse Parsons (neither of whom could properly swim), got into difficulties after trying to swim to the shore at Pelaw Wood. Michelsen was rescued by the coach of a nearby Hatfield crew, while Parsons died in the incident, with other students either swimming to shore or picked up in the water by a passing St John's boat.

In June 1914, not long before the outbreak of the First World War, a correspondent from The Times visited Durham for its annual June Week – essentially a week of activities, including a rowing regatta (capped off with fireworks and a torchlight procession) and the coxed fours race against Edinburgh, to mark the end of Summer term, and, for some participants, the end of their student days in Durham. Canon Greenwell, 95 years old at the time, recalled witnessing the first regatta held in Durham in 1834. The correspondent noted the growing ambitions of the boat club, with Durham University hoping to send a crew to Henley and win 'more than local laurels' in the near future.

After a period of fundraising it was confirmed in the Durham University Journal that same month that DUBC would be sending a single crew to Henley, which it was also hoped would help raise the profile of the university in the South of England.

Quite apart from the fact that they will do credit to their Varsity rowing, they will make people in the South realise there really is such a place as Durham University. Too often, when Durham is mentioned, there are murmers of "Theological College," etc., and it is surely the duty of every Durham man and woman to enlighten the ignorant on this matter

— Editorial, Durham University Journal, 1914

1924 saw the creation of the Armstrong College Women's Boat Club in Newcastle, followed in Durham in 1926 by the formation of a boat club by the Durham Women Students Association. In 1938 the Durham Colleges Women's Boat Club was established, and raced against teams from York and Newcastle.

DUBC competed in the Head of the River Race for the first time in 1949, finishing 41st in a time of 20 minutes 57 seconds with a crew drawn from the Durham Colleges and King's College in Newcastle.

1952 saw Sam Hobbs selected as spare man for the British Olympic team slated to compete in Helsinki. This made him the first DUBC athlete to become an Olympian.

=== 1963 to 1999 ===
1963 saw King's College in Newcastle separate from Durham to become Newcastle University. Earlier that year, 5 rowers from Newcastle (3 from King's College Boat Club and 2 from the Medics) were part of the crew of the VIII that won the Ortner Trophy for top University at the Head of the River Race for the first time, coming 17th overall. This was the last Durham crew to feature Rowers from Newcastle.

In 1964, Eric Halladay came to Durham as a lecturer in history and senior tutor of Grey College. This proved to be a key appointment that would lead to sustained success for DUBC in the years ahead. Halliday coached the Boat Club for over 30 years, winning the Ortner Shield 18 times in 1966–76 and 1978–84. After his death in 1997, DUBC launched a memorial trust fund with the aim of appointing a professional coach.

In November 1973, DUBC organised the first Northern Universities' Regatta, with sponsorship from Harp Lager. This ran annually until 1997. Also in 1973, DUBC bought the first Boat ever built with carbon-fibre ribs at a cost of £1,100. The Eight, "Prince Bishop" was 17 m (56 ft) in length and weighed 20 kg (45 lbs) less than any other Eight in Britain.

In 1977 the club celebrated its centenary in April and hosted races for eights on both the Tyne and Wear, with visiting crews from Newcastle, Cambridge University, Edinburgh, and the University of Groningen – the latter intending to celebrate its own centenary the following year. In 1978, they secured their first win at the Henley Royal Regatta, the first club from the northeast to win there for over a century.

In 1989 the DUBC Fresher's Squad was established. Alumni of this programme include Olympic bronze medallist Steve Rowbotham and Emily Taylor, a silver medallist at the 2008 European Championships. In 1990 DUBC alumni Roger Brown (who had graduated the previous year) and cox Russell Slatford took Gold in the Men's Eight at the Under-23 World Rowing Championships, then known as the Nations Cup.

In 1992 DUBC won the Visitors Challenge Cup at Henley Royal Regatta. 1992 also saw the first DUBC/DUWBC alumni selected as Olympic rowers since Newcastle's independence: Wade Hall-Craggs (men's single sculls, 14th), Roger Brown (men's quad sculls, 13th), Kim Thomas (women's coxless four, 8th) and Philippa Cross (women's eight, 7th).

=== 21st century ===
In 2000, Hall-Craggs was appointed head coach. For a while he was the only professional coach in the northeast, but by the 2004 Boat Race against Newcastle both teams had professional coaches, with Newcastle having recruited Callum MacDonald and Peter Lee now working under Hall-Craggs as coach of the Senior men's and women's teams.

In 2001, Durham University Women's Boat Club merged with Durham University Boat Club (previously exclusively male), with the combined club continuing as DUBC.

In 2007 the University awarded a grant of £127,000 to the newly refounded Tyne United Rowing Club to develop its facilities for use by DUBC and Durham College Rowing. These opened in 2009 on the south side of the Tyne, and include on-site cooking facilities, 18 Ergos and a rowing tank. The University has sole use of two boat sheds at Tyne United: one for DUBC and one for Durham College Rowing.

In 2008 Steve Rowbotham, who had come through the Freshers Program, won Bronze at the Beijing Olympics.

In 2008-9 an exhibition on "175 Years of Durham University Rowing" was held at the River and Rowing Museum in Henley on Thames, highlighting "the inspiring story behind one of the most successful university boat clubs in Britain".

At the 2012 Olympic Games in London, DUBC alumna Sophie Hosking won a Gold medal, followed by another Gold for current student Lily van den Broeck in the 2012 Paralympics.

In 2012 a powered indoor rowing tank was opened at the University's Maiden Castle sports facility, one of only three on the country. The facility also included a new boathouse (the Robert Gillespie Boathouse) for DUBC and a 28 station Ergo gallery. In November 2012 the rowing tank was named the Sophie Hosking Rowing Tank in honour of Olympic gold medallist and DUBC Alumna Sophie Hosking.

==== Head of the River Race ====
In 2005, DUBC won the Ortner Shield at the men's Head of the River Race for the first time in two decades, coming 10th overall. The return to form continued with the club winning both the Bernard Churcher Trophy (for the top university from anywhere in the world) and the Senior II pennant in 2008, coming 6th overall – Durham's best ever position. They retained the Senior II pennant in 2009 (10th overall). In 2012 the 1st VIII won the Bernard Churcher Trophy again (18th overall) and in 2015 (after the race was not run in 2013 and was abandoned in 2014), DUBC won the Halladay Trophy (for British universities with crews at Intermediate 1 status or below and no crews entered with Elite or Senior status), coming 32nd overall. DUBC won the Halladay Trophy again in 2016, coming 23rd overall.

At the Women's Eights Head of the River Race, Durham won the Senior II pennant in 2003, 2004 and 2005 and again in 2008, coming third overall. They won the University pennant in 2010, again coming third overall. In 2012 they won the Intermediate I pennant. They have finished in the top three universities a number of times in recent years, following victory in 2010 with third place in 2011, 2012 and 2015 and second in 2013 and 2014.

==== BUCS Regatta ====
The club won the Victor Ludorum at the British Universities and Colleges Sport (BUCS) Championships every year from 2004 to 2013. 2014 broke the 10 year hold on the top position, with Durham coming second to ULBC. That year also saw the addition of separate Women's and Men's trophies, with Durham taking the Women's VL and coming 5th in the Men's. 2015 saw DUBC regain top spot, taking both the overall and Women's Victor Ludorum and ranking 5th in the Men's.

==== European Universities Rowing Championships ====
The European Universities Rowing Championships is organised by EUSA, with boats qualifying to be part of their national team by performances in national university competitions (i.e. BUCS for British universities). Durham's first recorded success (only winners names are available for the 2005 and 2006 championships) came in the third championship in 2007, with gold in the women's pair, the lightweight women's quad scull, and the lightweight men's coxless four, and bronze in the lightweight men's double scull and the lightweight men's quad scull. Durham won gold again in the women's cockles four at the 8th games in 2013, as part of a UK team that came second in the medal take and third in the points table. In the 9th regatta in 2015, DUBC won gold in the lightweight women's scull, silver in the lightweight women's coxed four, bronze in the lightweight men's coxless four.

== Boat Race of the North ==
The Boat Race of the North is an annual challenge race between the Universities of Durham and Newcastle, in a similar vein to the Oxbridge Boat Race. It was held 1997-2010 under the name of the Northumbrian Water Boat Race (sponsored by Northumbrian Water) and was revived in 2015. The event is held annually on the River Tyne over an approximately 1500m course between Redheugh Bridge and Millennium Bridge in central Newcastle-upon-Tyne in May.

Races are held in four categories: Novice Women (Taylor Trophy); Novice Men (Renforth Trophy); Senior Women (Chambers Trophy); Senior Men (Clasper Trophy). The university that wins the most races takes the overall prize, with it being retained by the current holder in the case of a draw. Durham held the overall trophy until 2009, since when it has been held by Newcastle. The 2015 race ended with two wins each, Durham winning the men's and women's novice races and Newcastle winning both senior races, meaning Newcastle retained the title.

== International achievements ==
Current and former athletes from the club have competed at the U23 World Rowing Championships, Senior World Rowing Championships and other International Competitions. Athletes from the club have achieved medals at both Senior and U23 World Championships and the Youth Olympics.

=== Olympic representation ===
The first Durham rower to make the GB Olympic squad was Sam Hobbs who was spare man in 1952. In recent years, Durham representation had included Wade Hall-Craggs, Roger Brown, Kim Thomas and Philippa Cross (1992); Roger Brown (M8+), Philippa Cross (W2-) and Suzie Ellis (W8+) (1996); Ian Lawson (M1x) and Tracy Langlands (LW2x) (2004); Steve Rowbotham (bronze; M2x), James Clarke (LM4- ) Alice Freeman (W8+) and Louisa Reeve (W8+ and W2-) (2008); and Sophie Hosking (gold; LW2x) and Louisa Reeve (W8+) (2012). Lily van den Broecke coxed the mixed 4+ to gold in the 2012 Paralympics.

== Henley successes ==
The Club has had a number of notable Henley successes, with their first win coming in the Visitors Challenge Cup (M4-) in the Henley Royal Regatta (HRR) in 1978, which Durham won again in 1982, 1988, and 1992. This was followed up with successive wins at Henley Women's Regatta (HWR) in 1990 (Senior II 4+) and 1991 (Club VIIIs) and a further win in LW2 in 2001. In 2002 the men won the College VIIIs at HRR and in 2004 the women won the senior quads at HWR. In 2005 Durham won The Prince Albert Challenge Cup (formerly Men's Student Coxed Fours) at HRR and both the Remenham Challenge Cup (Women's Senior Coxless Fours), in a composite with Nottingham University BC, and the Senior Single Scull at HWR. Since then wins at HRR have come through composites with Oxford Brookes in 2009 in the Prince of Wales Challenge Cup, and with the Leander Club in 2010 in the Visitors' Challenge Cup. Durham's success has continued at the HWR, with 10 wins (including 2 in composites) over 2006–2015.

=== Henley Royal Regatta wins ===
Event	Year	Crew
The Prince of Wales Challenge Cup	2019	Nottingham R.C. and Edinburgh Univ. Composite (G. Bourne)
Visitors Challenge Cup	2010	Leander and Durham University Composite
The Prince of Wales Challenge Cup	2009	Durham University & Oxford Brookes University Composite
The Prince Albert Challenge Cup	2005	P.Evans, P.Thomas, J.Foster, N.Jones, T.Hill
Visitors Challenge Cup	1992	C.Harris, H.Mills, E.Bellamy, S.Pattinson
Visitors Challenge Cup	1988	S.Taylor, M.Towers, J.Chaytor, O.Hall-Craggs
Visitors Challenge Cup	1982	S.Pelly, A.Purvis, D.Rendle, D.Hessian
Visitors Challenge Cup	1978	P.McManners, T.Durie, P.Scott, C.Shawcross

=== Henley Women's Regatta wins ===
Event	Year	Crew
Elite Coxless Pair	2015	Hanna Gailis Inntjore (DUBC), Anna Een Sture (Norske Studenters)
Intermediate Academic VIII	2015	DUBC
Elite Lightweight Coxless Pair	2013	M.Wilson, A.Carlton
Intermediate Academic Coxed Four	2011	F.Cox, R.Martin, J.Stephenson, R.Minikin, A.Beake
Elite 4- The Avril Vellacott Cup	2010	DUBC, Glasgow RC, Nottingham RC
Intermediate Coxed Four The Cathy Cruickshank Trophy	2009	
Elite 2- The Redgrave Trophy	2008	
Senior 2x	2008	
Elite Lightweight Quad Sculls Rankine Trophy	2007	S.Bradshaw, A.Wolstencroft, F.Fletcher, E.Steel
Senior Quad Sculls The Chairman's Trophy	2006	M.Paxton, A.Hoskins, F.Fletcher, E.Steel
Senior Single Scull	2005	L.Gater
Remenham Challenge Cup	2005	L.Reeve, A.Allin, L.Gooderham (Composite with Nottingham University Boat Club)
Senior Quad Sculls	2004	C.Leake, R.Harris, A.Allin, L.Reeve
College Eights	2002	N.Hoogesteger, L.Buxton, B.Oldale, C.Kingston, L.Gater, H.Loughran, M.Scott, C.Leake, E.Crozier
Lwt Pair	2001	Tideway Scullers School /Durham University
Club Eights	1991	F. Cunningham, M. Cooke, S. Van Newkirk, A. Holland, K. Thomas, P. Graham, A. Lancaster, C. Phillips, E. Dutton
Senior 2 Coxed Fours 'C'	1990	S. Van Newkirk, L. Morgan, L. Lugg, C. Philipps, R. Slatford

=== National champions ===
Year	Winning crew/s
1978	Men Ltw 1x
2007	Women 2-, Open L1x
2010	Open 2-, Women 1x
2016	Women J18 1x

== See also ==
- Durham College Rowing
- List of Durham University Boat Club rowers with articles on Wikipedia
- List of rowing clubs on the River Wear
- University rowing in the United Kingdom
