= Hatfield College Boat Club =

British rowing club

- Motto: Latin: Vel Primus Vel Cum Primis
- Location: Durham, England
- Coordinates: 54.7739°N 1.5731°W
- Home water: River Wear
- Founded: 1846; 180 years ago
- Affiliations: British Rowing
- Website: www.hatfieldjcr.co.uk/sports-and-socs-subs/p/hcbc

Hatfield College Boat Club (HCBC) is the rowing club of Hatfield College at Durham University on the River Wear in England.

HCBC is a registered Boat Club through British Rowing, with Boat Code "HAT" and is a member organisation of Durham College Rowing.

The club is open to members of the Hatfield College JCR, MCR and SCR of all abilities. There is a Novice Development programme for absolute beginners. HCBC also trains coxes and has a dedicated Coxes Captain.

The club competes in head races and regattas across the country, including the Head of the River Race, Henley Royal Regatta, Henley Women's Regatta, Durham Regatta, as well as inter-collegiate competitions run by Durham College Rowing.

== History ==
The club was started in 1846, shortly after the founding of the college, making it one of the oldest student clubs in Durham. HCBC was part of the first intercollegiate race, against University College Boat Club in 1850.

The current college boathouse was completed in Epiphany term of 1881, with the previous structure having to be rebuilt and re-sited at the cost of £250 – club members believing it to be 'inconveniently small' and very exposed to flood damage. Up until 2001 Hatfield shared its boat club with rowers from Trevelyan College. Tension over space, resulting from Hatfield's desire to purchase additional boats, saw the termination of this arrangement, with Trevelyan later electing to store its boats with the local owner of a private boathouse.

Until 2003, HCBC organised an annual regatta for Novice rowers in Michaelmas term; known as the Hatfield Cup until 2003, when Durham College Rowing took over the organising of the event.

In 2016, the boathouse was one of several to fall victim to racist graffiti and had a swastika and SS symbol splashed on the doors. Major maintenance was carried out in 2019: the roof was reinforced and the doors sanded and repainted.

== Alumni ==
Notable former members of the club include Alice Freeman, Louisa Reeve, Angus Groom, and Simon Barr.

The boat club's alumni society, The White Lion Club, connects current students with alumni at key events throughout the year such as the Head of the River Race, Durham Regatta and the annual Christmas dinner. The club has also benefited from generous donations from alumni to fund new equipment.

== See also ==
- University rowing (UK)
- List of rowing clubs on the River Wear
