= St John's College Boat Club (Durham) =

British rowing club

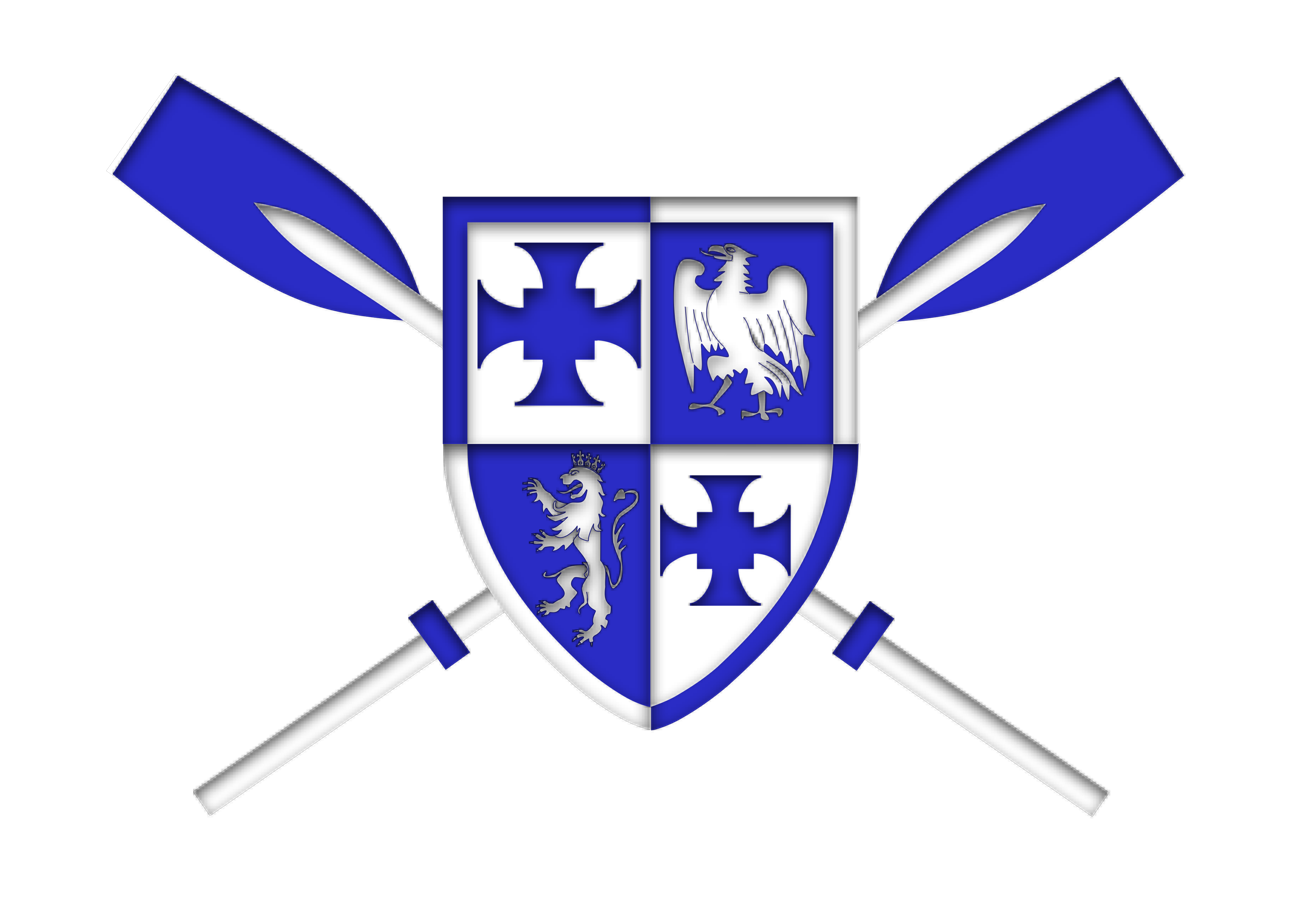

- Motto: "Est dolor nostra victoria"
- Location: Clive's Boathouse, St John's College boathouse, Durham
- Coordinates: 54.771244°N 1.574940°W
- Home water: River Wear
- Founded: 1910
- Key people: Olivia Effingham (Captain of Boats)
- Affiliations: British Rowing; Durham College Rowing; St John's College; Durham University
- Website: sjcbcdurham.wordpress.com

St John's College Boat Club (SJCBC) is the rowing club of St John's College, Durham University, England. It was founded in 1910 and is one of the oldest boat clubs in Durham.

SJCBC is a registered Boat Club through British Rowing, with Boat Code "SJC" and is a member organisation of Durham College Rowing.

== History ==
Rowing began at St John's College in October 1910 when trials were held to select a crew for a IV. In 1911, however, the boat house was built thanks to the help of Revd Watts-Ditchfield who telling commented, "we have not won anything yet but can see improvements." Henry Ganderton played a leading role in developing the Club in the 1910s and 1920s.

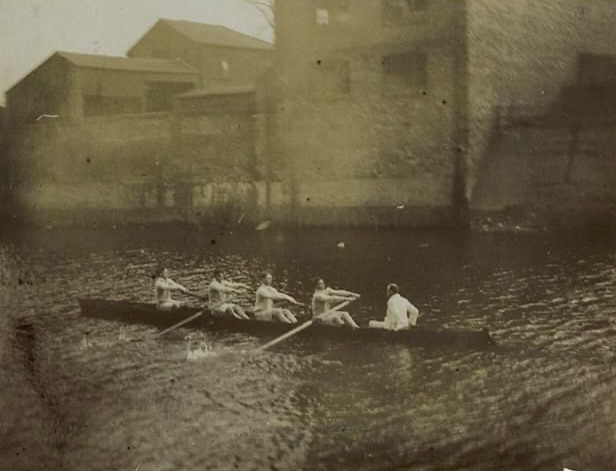
Trial Fours Crew 1913 (C. F. Harman, F. R. Cooksley, E. T. Pakenham, J. E. Eastwood, B. M. Banks).

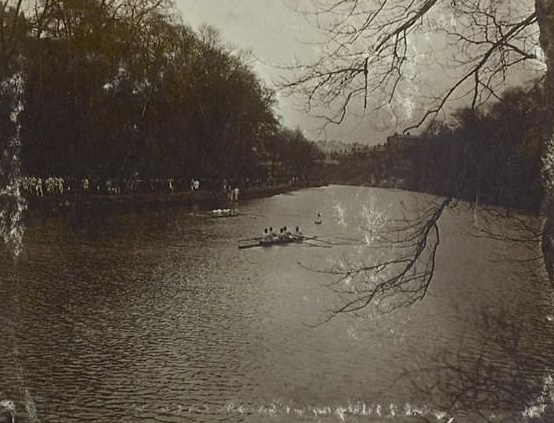
Senate Cup 1913

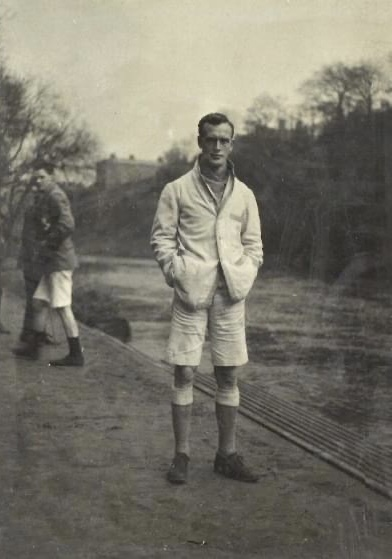
A. J. Kelland 1920

In the 1930s James Atkinson likewise made a great impression on rowing at St John's, captaining for both SJCBC and the University.

== Structure ==
The club is entirely run by students and attracts most of its members from St John's College – though anyone can join with the permission of the Captain of Boats.

The club has around 80 active members. It is run by an executive committee, elected at the club's annual general meeting in June. These are Captain of Boats, Men's Squad Captain, Women's Squad Captain, Head Coxswain, Secretary, Treasurer, Head Boatman, Water Safety and Welfare Officer, Novice Development Officer, Social Secretary, Secretary to the Regatta Blue Club, and Publicity Officer. The club's alumni association, the Regatta Blue Club, maintains a strong link between past and present students who meet together for major events.

== Competition ==
The Club competes at a national, regional and college level, and has entered boats into BUCS, Head of the River Race (HoRR), Women's Head of the River Race (WeHorr), and the Boston Rowing Marathon.

=== Head of The River Race ===
St. John’s College Boat Club have raced Head of the River Race fifteen times since 2001. The M1 crew won the Small Academic Pennant in 2023. The Clubs highest finish position is also recorded below.

Awards
Year	Award	Position	Time	Crew
2023	Small Academic Pennant	201	19:56.6	Coxswain: R. Allen , Stroke: J. Richards, L. Fleming, S. King, B. Sporton, C. Lester, M. Bamforth, T. Holmes, Bow: G. Weston

Highest Finish Position
Year	Position	Time
2009	195	19:40.45

=== Women’s Head of the River Race ===
St. John's College Boat Club have raced Women's Head of the River Race seven times since 2003. The Clubs highest finish position is recorded below.

Highest Finish Position
Year	Position	Time
2012	188	23:47.14

=== Durham Regatta ===
Durham Regatta wins since 2009 are listed below.

Year	Event	Award	Notes
2026	W NCA 4+	The TSB Challenge Cup	S: E Perkins, 3: Z. Wilkinson, 2: M. Harrison, B: C. Langrish, C: F. Barnett
2026	W Eli B 4+	-	S: O. Effingham, 3: E. Perkins, 2: M. Harrison, B: K. Forde, C: F. Barnett
2026	Op Eli B 8+	-	S: S. Read Moreira Lima, 7: A. Hambling, 6: A. Kellagher, 5: H. Allen, 4: R. Merchant, 3: E. Gray, 2: D. Luff, B: G. Morrow, C: A. Garcia-Rodriguez
2025	Op NCA 8+	Joseph Brown Memorial Cup	S: A. Kellagher, 7: G. Weston, 6: J. Savine, 5: O. Smith, 4: J. Roberts, 3: E. Gray, 2: R. Merchant, B: A. Hambling, C: A. Garcia-Rodriguez
2024	Op NCA 4+	Durham University Challenge Trophy	Composite crew with Grey College Boat Club S: L. Fleming, 3: G. Drake (Grey), 2: H. Bamforth, B. F. Fleming (Grey), C: R. Allen
2022	W Mdn 4+	-	-
2015	IM2.8+(b)	-	-
2013	Nov.8+	Lowe Challenge Bowl	Composite with St Chad's College Boat Club
2010	IM2.4+	Rushworth and Storey Challenge Cup	-
2010	NOV.4+	Lady Herschell Plate	-
2010	IM3.4+	Durham City Plate	-
2009	IM3.8+	Arthur C. Clark Challenge Cup	-

=== Other Events ===
St. John’s College Boat Club regularly competes successfully in races in the Northern Rowing region, with wins in the 2024-25 season at Durham Autumn Small Boats Head, Tyne New Years Head, Durham City Regatta, Tees Regatta, Wansbeck Regatta, and Durham Regatta. They also compete in DCR-organised events such as Senate Cup and Novice Cup.

== People ==
=== Captain of Boats ===
The Captain of Boats is the President of St John's College Boat Club, elected at the AGM in June. Listed below are previous Captains since 2017.

Year	Name
Current	Olivia Effingham
2025-26	Alex Kellagher
2024-25	Jonathan Savine
2023-24	Ahaura Keighley
2022-23	John Richards
2021-22	Caiden Whittaker
2020-21	Edward Barbera
2019-20	Holly Jackson
2018-19	Fergus Walsh
2017-18	Toby Lehain

== Club colours ==
The blades are a dark Regatta blue and boats have Regatta blue and crimson chevrons on their bow-canvasses.

The racing Lycra all-in-one is Navy blue with red and white stripes.

The club blazer is white with Regatta Blue trim. Blazers are awarded to members as a sign of long-term commitment and athletic achievement, and is worn by members at formal and informal social events.

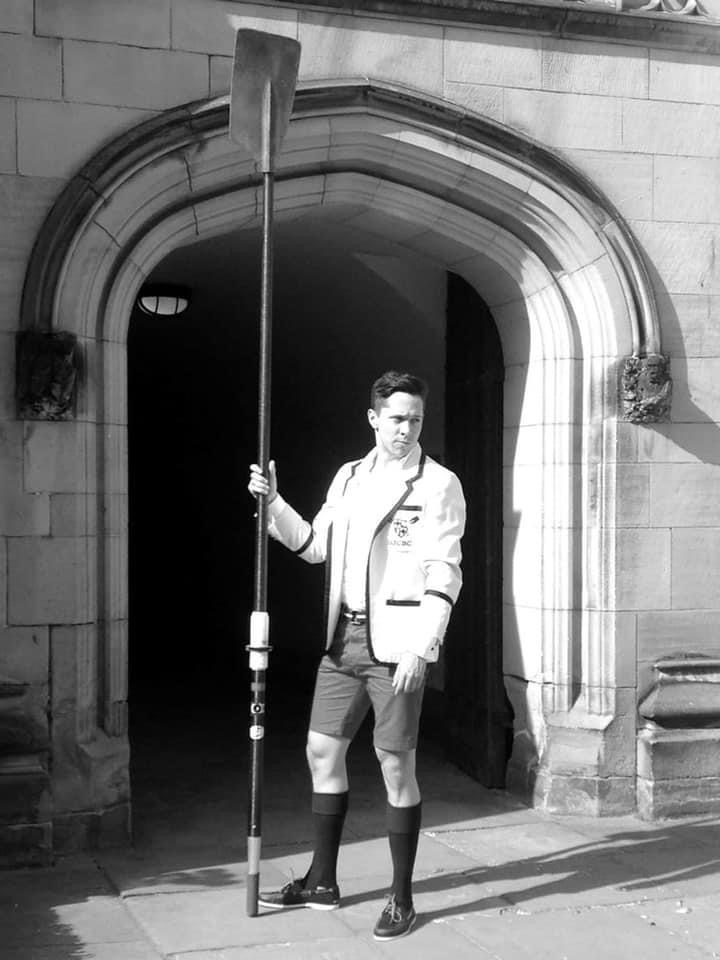
St. John's College Boat Club, Durham - Colours.

== See also ==
- University rowing in the United Kingdom
- List of rowing clubs on the River Wear
