= University College Boat Club (Durham) =

British rowing club

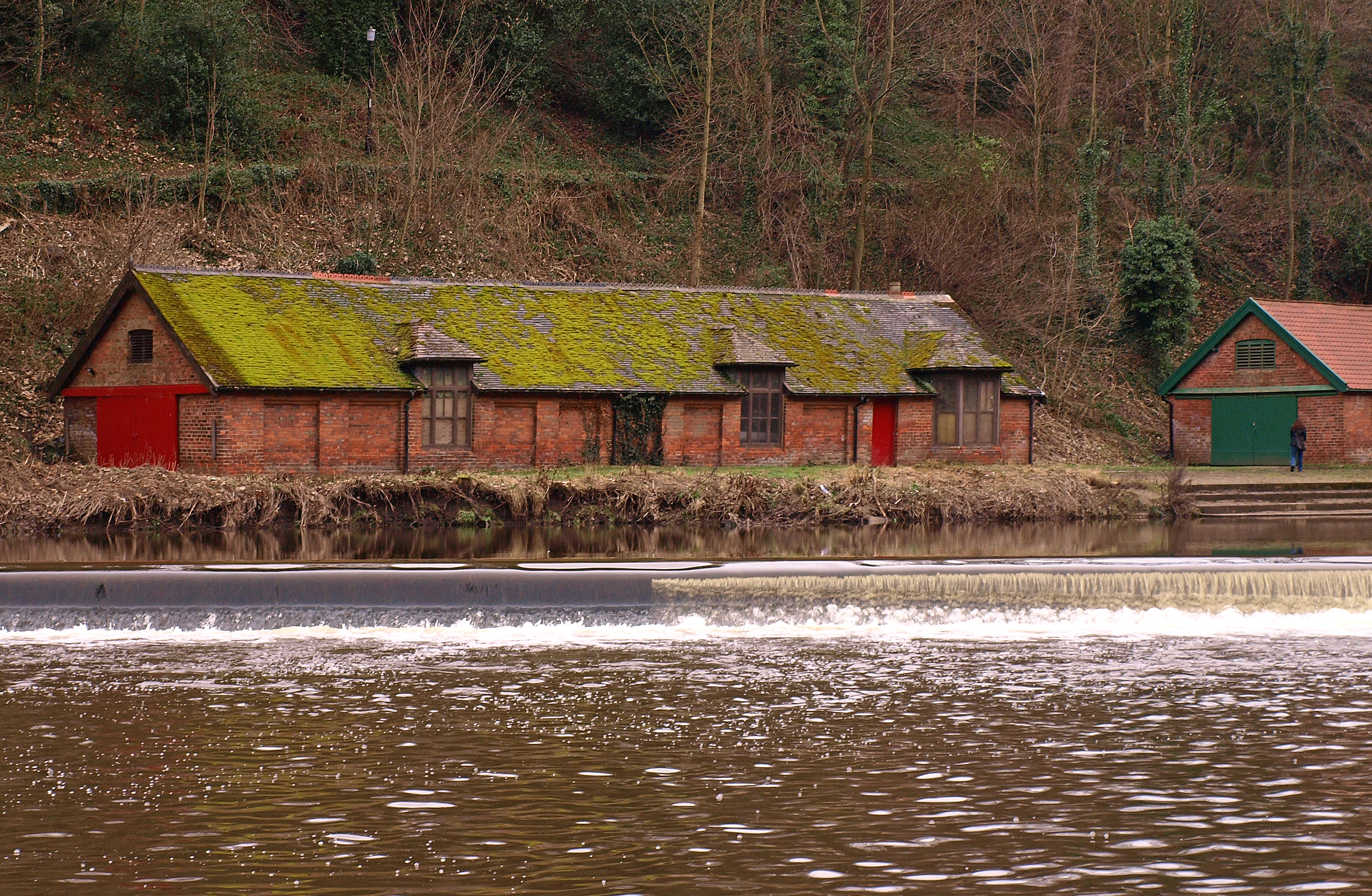

- Motto: Non Nobis Solum (Not for ourselves alone)
- Location: Durham, England
- Coordinates: 54°46′20.5″N 1°34′43.26″W
- Home water: River Wear
- Founded: 1834; 192 years ago
- Affiliations: British Rowing
- Website: www.ucbc.co.uk

University College Boat Club (UCBC) is the rowing club of University College at Durham University on the River Wear in England.

UCBC has won the Grand Challenge Cup at Durham Regatta more than any other College (the majority of these wins in the 19th Century) and has qualified for Henley Royal Regatta, most recently in 2001.

Founded in 1834, UCBC is the oldest society in Durham University and is the oldest Boat Club in the North of England. The club celebrated its 175th anniversary at Durham Regatta in 2009. The Alumni organisation is Floreat Castellum Boat Club (FCBC).

UCBC is a registered Boat Club through British Rowing, with Boat Code "UCD" and is a member organisation of Durham College Rowing.

== History ==
UCBC was founded in 1834, soon after University College and the University were established. The first Durham Regatta was held over 17–19 June 1834, opening with a six-oared race in 1834 won by Velocity, owned by W. L. Wharton, High Sheriff of Durham, against University College in Sylph. Following the establishment of Hatfield Hall, UCBC was part of the first intercollegiate race, against Hatfield College Boat Club in 1850.

When the Grand Challenge Cup (for coxed Fours) was introduced at Durham Regatta in 1854 it was won seven times by crews from UCBC before 1862, with teams from rival Hatfield typically coming second. However, the founding of Durham Amateur Rowing Club and increased entries from further afield would eventually bring an end to University College's dominance. Entries for competitive races around this time could be informal, and often formed by scratch teams rowing under the name of the boat and not the collegiate body to which they belonged, making it difficult to successfully identify college crews in the early records.

Although University College Boat Club and Hatfield College Boat Club (1846) had been established soon after the founding of their respective colleges, Durham University Boat Club (DUBC) was only formally founded in 1877 'to produce representative student crews and to act as the controlling body' for various clubs already active. UCBC focussed on local races within Durham, including Durham Regatta and intercollegiate events such as Senate Cup.

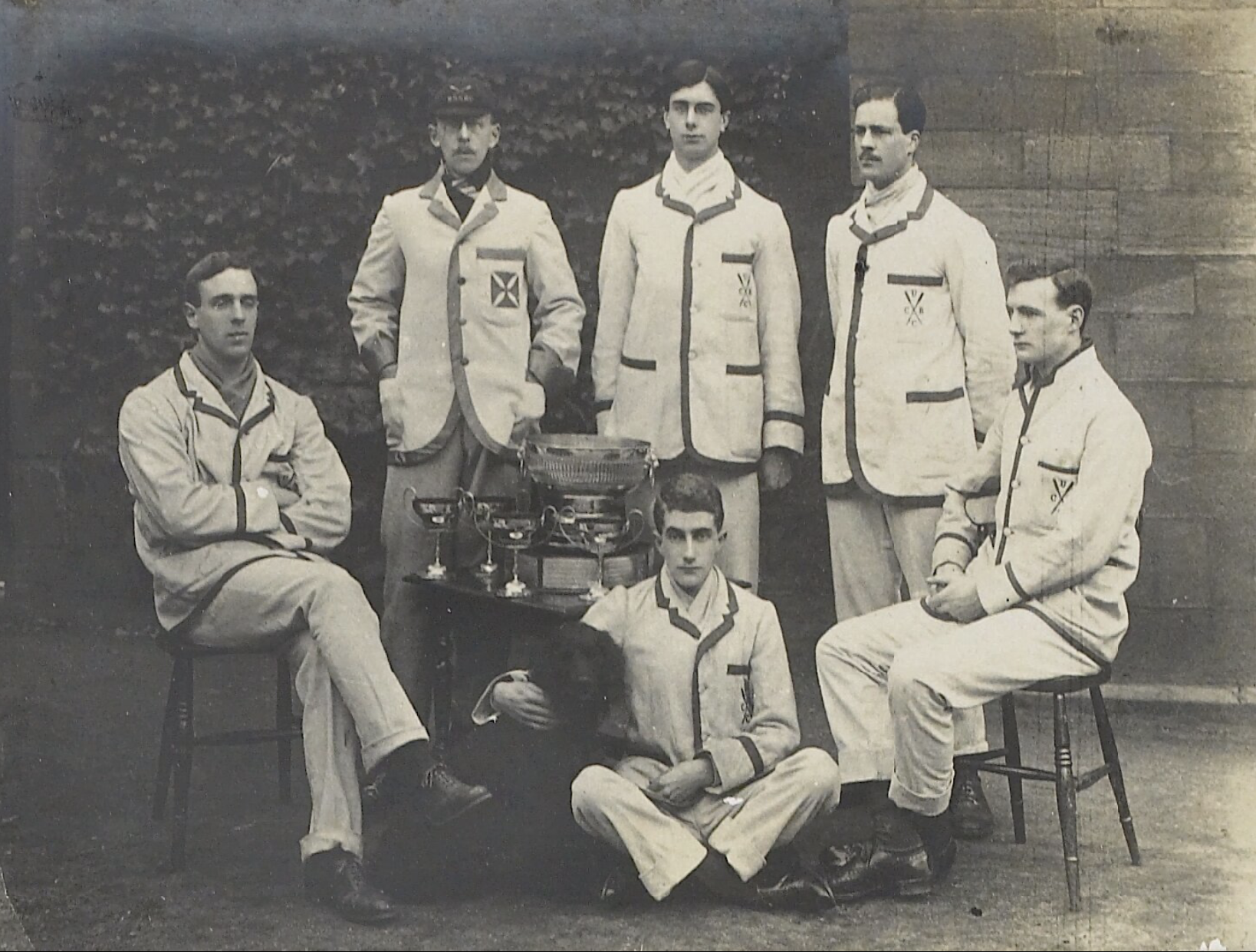
1912 University College Senate Cup winning crew, in UCBC blazers, with trophies and a dog (sitting front left)

In the 1880s the current college boathouse was built, and was constructed with a bar and baths. These have since been removed to allow additional racking space. The original club landing stage was closer to the weir, but was later rebuilt at the present location upstream in 1959 to allow more space to maneuver between the stage and the weir. In 1897, Durham Amateur Rowing Club (DARC) built their boathouse next door, until moving to their new boathouse in 1969. Now St Leonard's School Boat Club occupy the adjacent boathouse.

Both world wars and the Great Depression caused reductions in the number of students at the college, and in the club. The club entered the Second World War with an elderly fleet in need of replacement. The war and post war austerity limited further boat building so the club spent the post war years with an outdated fleet, limiting club successes.

In the following decades, college membership increased, with similar increases in club size. In 1987, the college admitted women, and the first women's captain was appointed in 1988. As the membership rose, the club began to enter races across the country, including the Britannia Challenge Club at Henley Royal Regatta in 2001.

== Boathouse and fleet ==
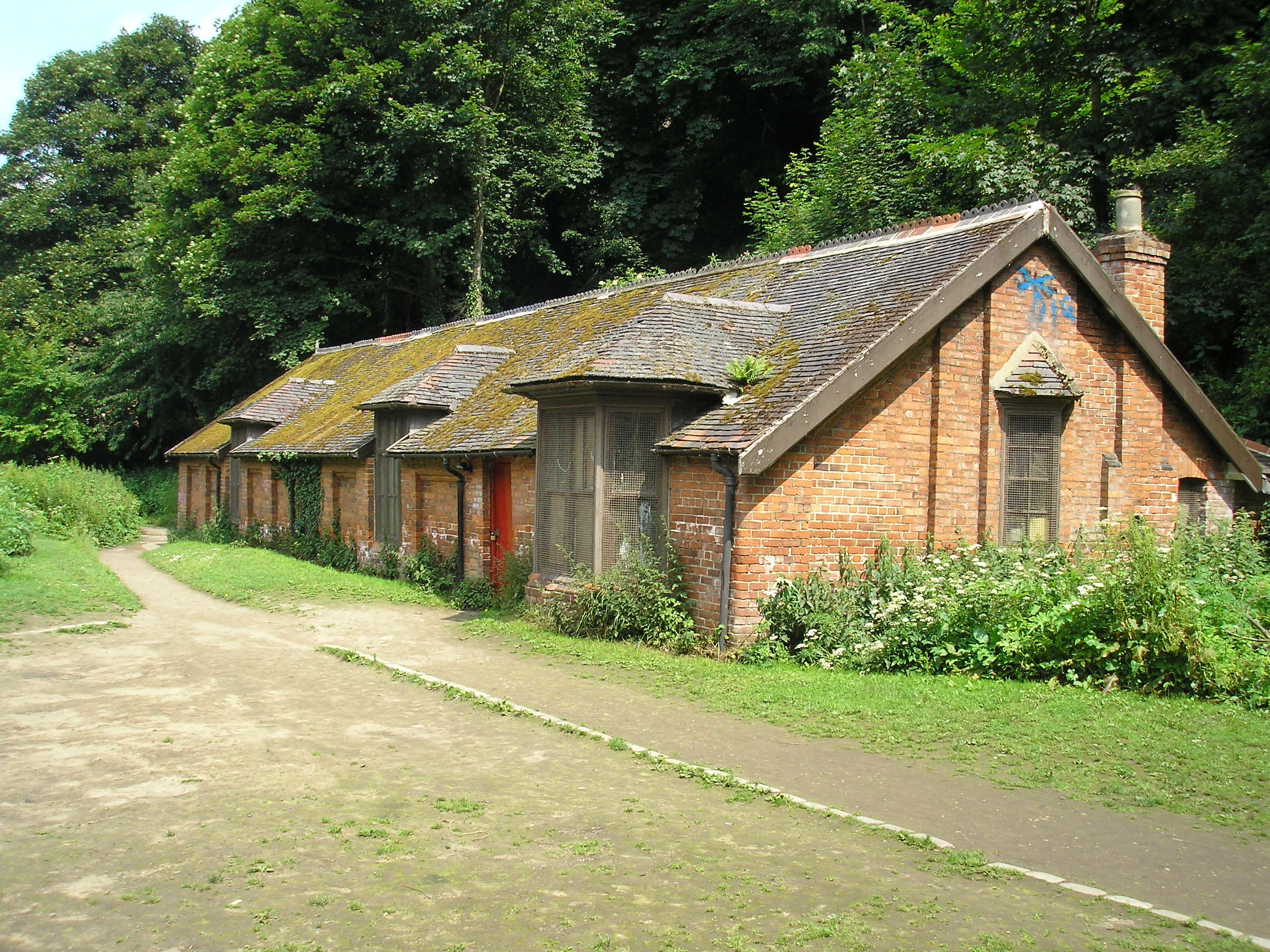
University College Boathouse has been the home of UCBC since the 1880s.

UCBC uses University College boathouse on the River Wear just below Durham Cathedral and a short walk from the Castle. It is at one end of the rowable stretch of river in Durham, on the Bailey, downstream of Prebends Bridge but upstream of the weir. St Aidan's College Boat Club (SACBC) also racks boats in this boathouse.

UCBC owns 2 VIIIs, 6 IVs, and smaller boats. These were manufactured by Vespoli, Stampfli, Janousek, WinTech, Sims and Browns Boathouse and the oars were produced by Concept2.

For races outside Durham the club either rents local boats or rents trailer space e.g. from Durham Amateur Rowing Club or Durham University Boat Club.

== Races ==
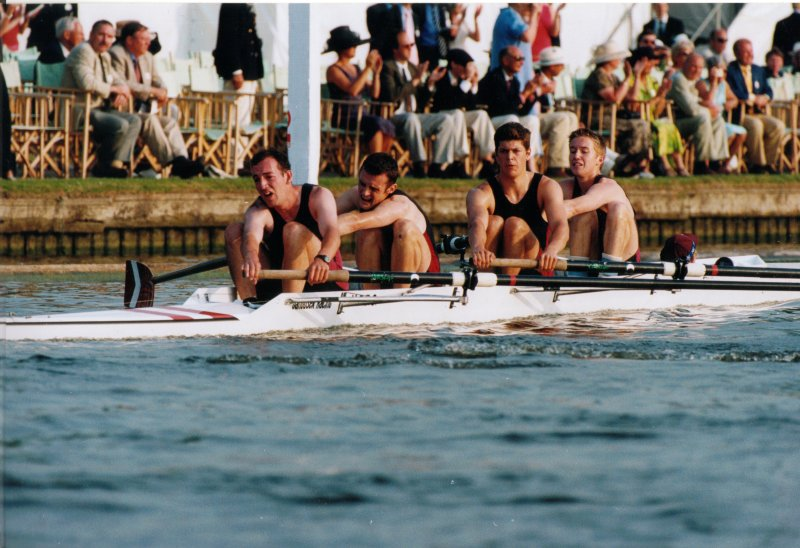
UCBC 1st IV at Henley Royal Regatta.

UCBC competes in many races and regattas both in the North East and the rest of the United Kingdom. Below are some of the events UCBC has competed in the past:

National events

- Henley Royal Regatta
- The Head of the River Race
- Women's Head of the River Race
- Heineken Roeivierkamp (Amsterdam)
- Head of the River Fours
- BUCS Regatta (Nottingham or Glasgow)
- Head of the Trent (Nottingham)

Regional events

- Durham Regatta
- Durham City Regatta
- Durham SBH
- Hexham Regatta
- Rutherford Head
- Tees SBH
- Tyne Regatta
- Tyne Head
- York Summer Regatta
- York SBH

College events

- Novice Cup
- Senate Cup
- Hayward Cup
- Pennant Short Course
- Admirals Regatta

A 24-hour indoor rowing marathon used to be held annually against rival Hatfield College Boat Club. The charity event was jointly run by both clubs in Epiphany term.

== Club structure ==
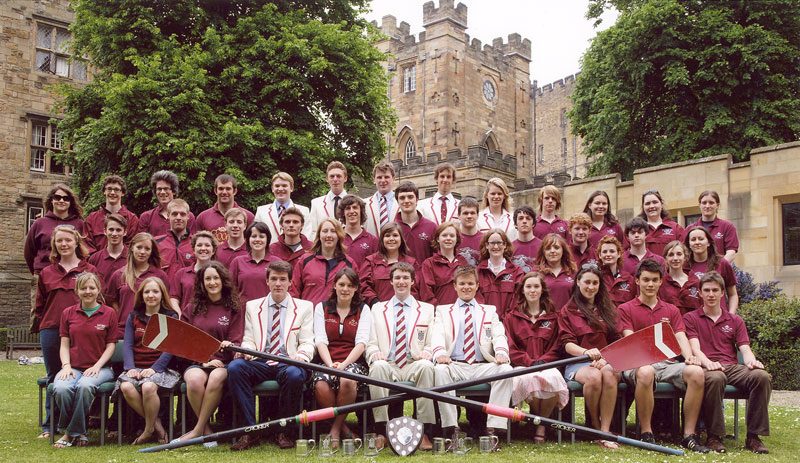
University College Boat Club in 2008

Any member of University College JCR, MCR or SCR can join UCBC as an ordinary member and any other student of Durham University may join with the President's permission. The club is run by an executive committee selected annually. These are the President, Men's Captain, Women's Captain, Secretary, Treasurer, Novice Captains, Social Secretary, Safety & Welfare Officer, Communications Officer and Boatman. As a tradition, the handover occurs when the 1st VIII crosses the finish line in the (unofficial) race against FCBC at Durham Regatta.

All club members are able to join the club's alumni organisation Floreat Castellum Boat Club (FCBC). This organises an annual dinner and drinks at Henley Royal Regatta as well as an invitational race at Durham Regatta against the current UCBC 1st VIII. All members of FCBC are treated as life members of UCBC. Since 2011, FCBC has donated two 8+'s and three 4+'s to UCBC.

UCBC holds an annual Ball each year in Epiphany term. Previous locations include Durham Town Hall, The Royal County Hotel in Durham, The Three Tuns Hotel in Durham and the Assembly Rooms Newcastle.

== Club colours ==
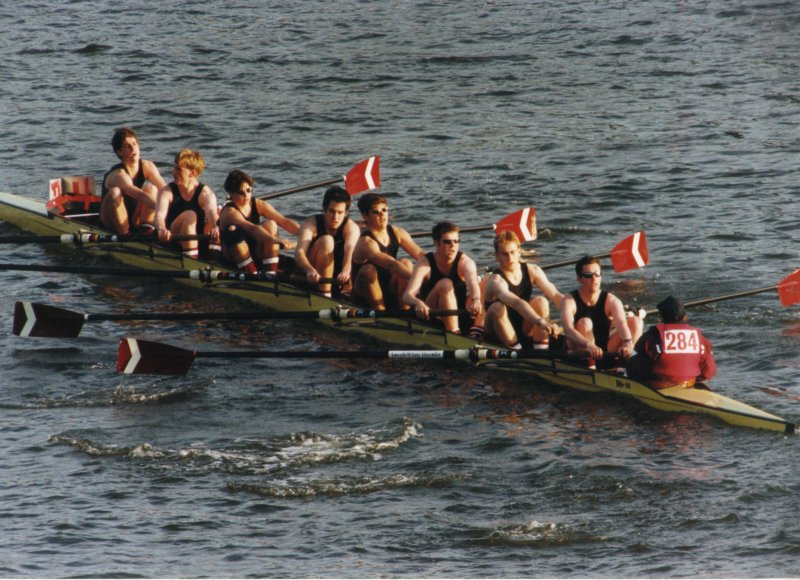
UCBC 2nd VIII at The Head of the River Race 18 March, 2000

The club blades are cardinal with a white chevron, cardinal being the colour of University College.

The club racing kit is defined for all-in-ones as "black with cardinal side strip" or the club Zephyrs as "White with Cardinal Trim". For winter racing, the club tech tops are "black with cardinal trim". Members of the 1st VIII are eligible to wear different tech tops: "white with cardinal trim and 1st VIII on the collar".

The club blazer is "white with cardinal trim". 1 or 2 stripes on the sleeves indicate current or past membership of the second or first VIII respectively. This can be worn at all club socials and some college events.

== See also ==
- University rowing (UK)
- List of rowing clubs on the River Wear
