= Ustinov College, Durham =

Constituent college of Durham University

Ustinov College
- Durham University
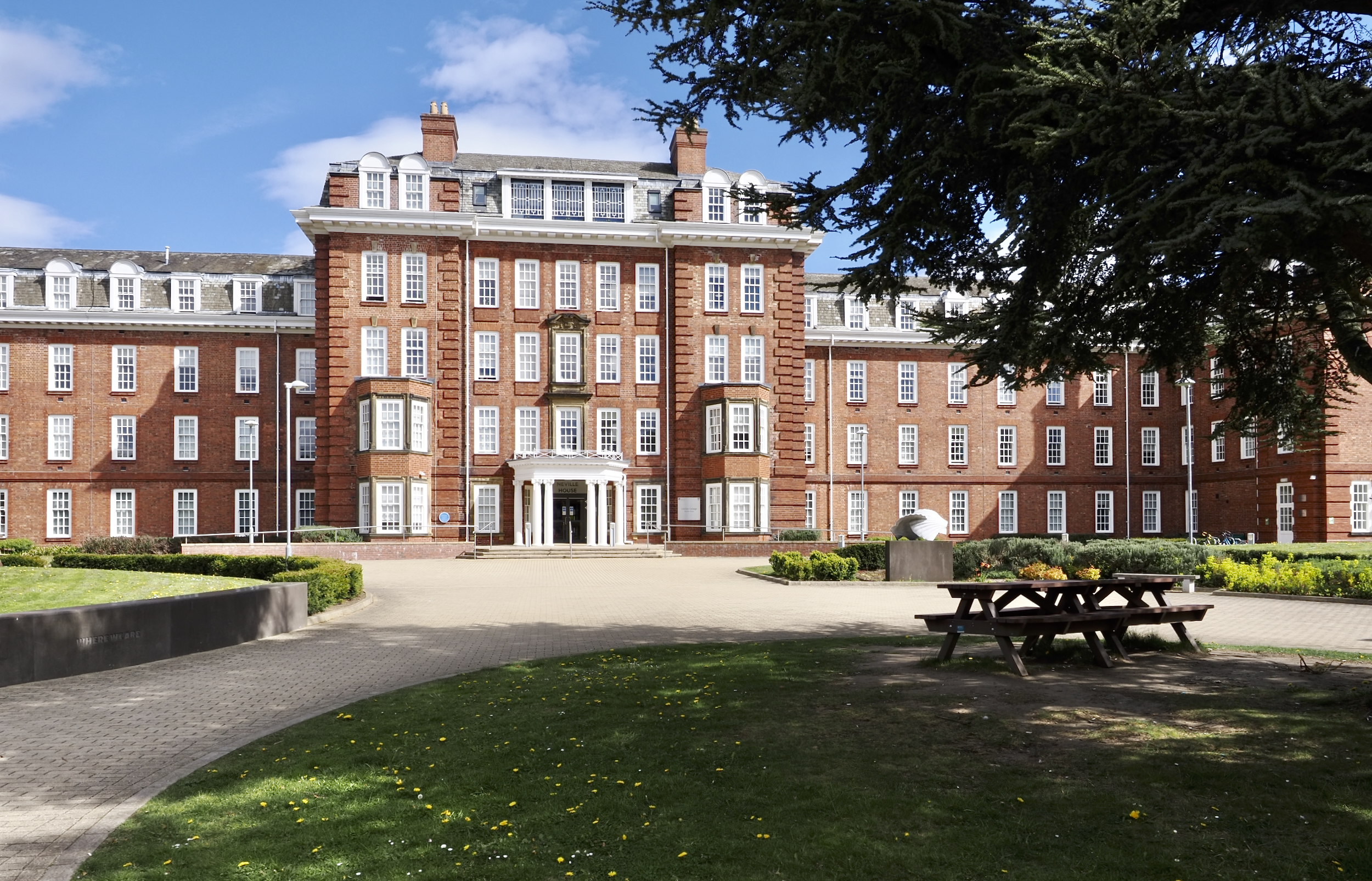
- Neville's House, Ustinov College

- Arms of Ustinov College; Arms: Ermine, a cross formy quadrate gules; on a chief indented sable between three lions rampant argent two lozenges
- Coordinates: 54.769288°N 1.591382°W
- Motto: Latin: Diversitate Valemus
- Motto in English: Diversity is our Strength
- Established: 1965 as a Society; 2003 as a College
- Named for: Sir Peter Ustinov
- Former names: Graduate Society (1965–2003)
- Colours
- Principal: Glenn McGregor
- Vice principal: Sarah Prescott
- Undergraduates: N/A
- Postgraduates: 1143 (2023/24)
- Website: Ustinov College
- GCR: Ustinov GCR
- Boat club: Ustinov College Boat Club

Map
- Location within Durham, England

Ustinov College is a constituent college of Durham University. Founded in 1965 as the Graduate Society, it achieved full college status in 2003 and adopted its current name in honour of the then-chancellor of the university, Sir Peter Ustinov.

Ustinov is Durham’s first graduate-only college, and is the largest college by number of students both full and part-time. The college moved to Sheraton Park in Neville's Cross in 2017, having previously based in Howlands Farm at the top of Elvet Hill.

Members of Ustinov College are termed Ustinovian and instead of a formal tutorial supervision, the college runs its own mentorship programme. Ustinov is the only college in Durham to offer boarding to families and partners of its students. The college has no regular formal halls nor does it require its members to don their gowns. It is also unique, by virtue of having a graduate-only community, in having a Graduate Common Room.

== History ==
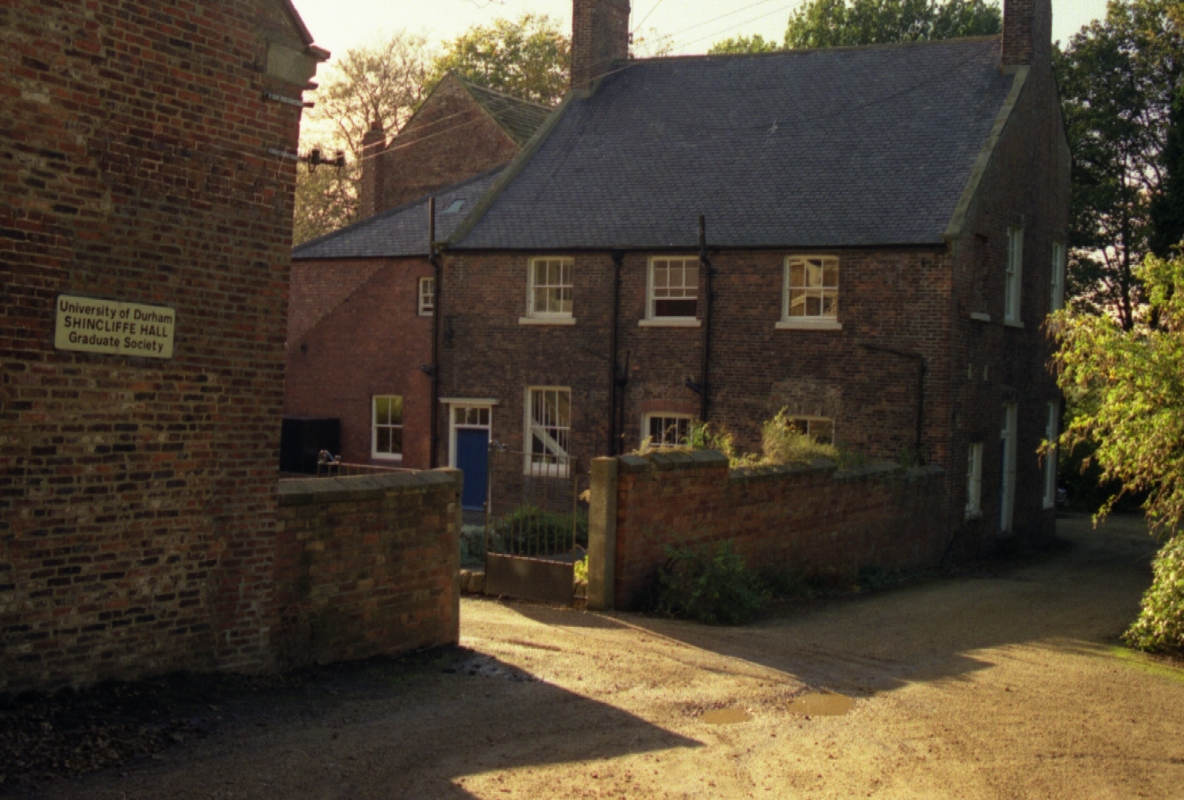
Shincliffe Hall, former college accommodation

In 1965, William Bayne Fisher, a professor in Durham University's geography department, founded the Graduate Society and in its inaugural year, the total membership was 94 students: 86 men and 8 women. As more than 50% of its members lived in private accommodation, it retained its status as a society for over 35 years. In this time, the society acquired more accommodation: the Parsons field site off Old Elvet consisted of Fisher House, the Parsons Field House, Fonteyn Court and the Parsons Field Court; Palatine House; Kepier House and Kepier Court, both at the top of Claypath; 29, 34 and 38 on Old Elvet and Shincliffe Hall in Shincliffe Village.

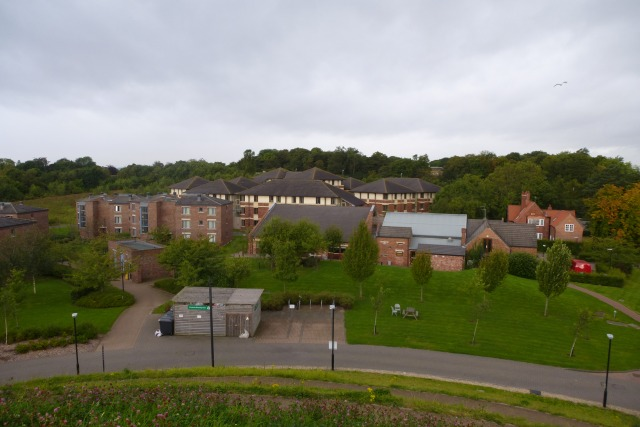
Howland's Farm, home of Ustinov College 2005-2017

The society's accommodation has since then been gradually consolidated with the building of new accommodation at Howlands Farm in 1998, and on Dryburn Road in 2005. Since 1965, membership has increased to more than 1500 and in 2003, the society was turned into a college and named in honour of the Chancellor of the University (1992–2004), Sir Peter Ustinov. The college's offices were moved from Old Elvet to the Howlands Farm site in September 2005. The college motto (Diversitate Valemus) was coined later that year by Zu'bi Al-Zu'bi, President of the GCR.

The Parson's Field site at the end of Old Elvet, which had been the heart of the community during its years as the Graduate Society, was handed over to St Cuthbert's Society in 2005 and Palatine house was transferred to Hatfield College in 2006.

In 2017, Ustinov College moved from Howlands Farm to Sheraton Park, originally built for Neville's Cross College in 1921 and vacated in 2004.

== Membership ==
While Durham's other colleges accept postgraduates, Ustinov College admits them exclusively, and is less formal in its structure than the other colleges. There are reported to be more than 100 nationalities represented in Ustinov College, including members from Thailand, Greece, the United States, Jordan, Nigeria, and Taiwan.

== Graduate Common Room ==
The Graduate Common Room (GCR) is the student community of Ustinov College and all student members of the college, whether living in or out, are eligible for membership. Historically, the postgraduate community (through its elected representatives, the House Committee) had a high degree of autonomy from college officers and was self-governing in many matters. Today, the GCR committee, made up of elected house representatives officers, represent students' views in meetings with the college officers. The GCR committee also organises many student social events such as regular formal dinners, parties, the annual Summer Ball and Ustinov Summer Barbecue. As well as this, the GCR oversees many clubs and societies within the college. The first college formal was held in late 2006.

== Ustinov Boat Club ==
Ustinov Boat Club Blade Colours

Ustinov Boat Club (UBC) is the rowing club for Ustinov College.

The club was formed in 1974 as the "Graduate Society Boat Club" (GSBC) but in 2004, the boat club applied to British Rowing (then the Amateur Rowing Association) to officially change its name to Ustinov Boat Club (UBC). The name change was considered necessary in order to reflect the college name change from the Graduate Society to Ustinov College. GSBC officially became UBC on Tuesday the 9th of November 2004.

UBC is located at Dunelm House, alongside Grey College Boat Club and Butler College Boat Club, on the River Wear between Kingsgate Bridge and Elvet Bridge. UBC colours are white with black edges.

The club has had periods of low membership, and British Rowing membership has lapsed, and then the club has reformed.

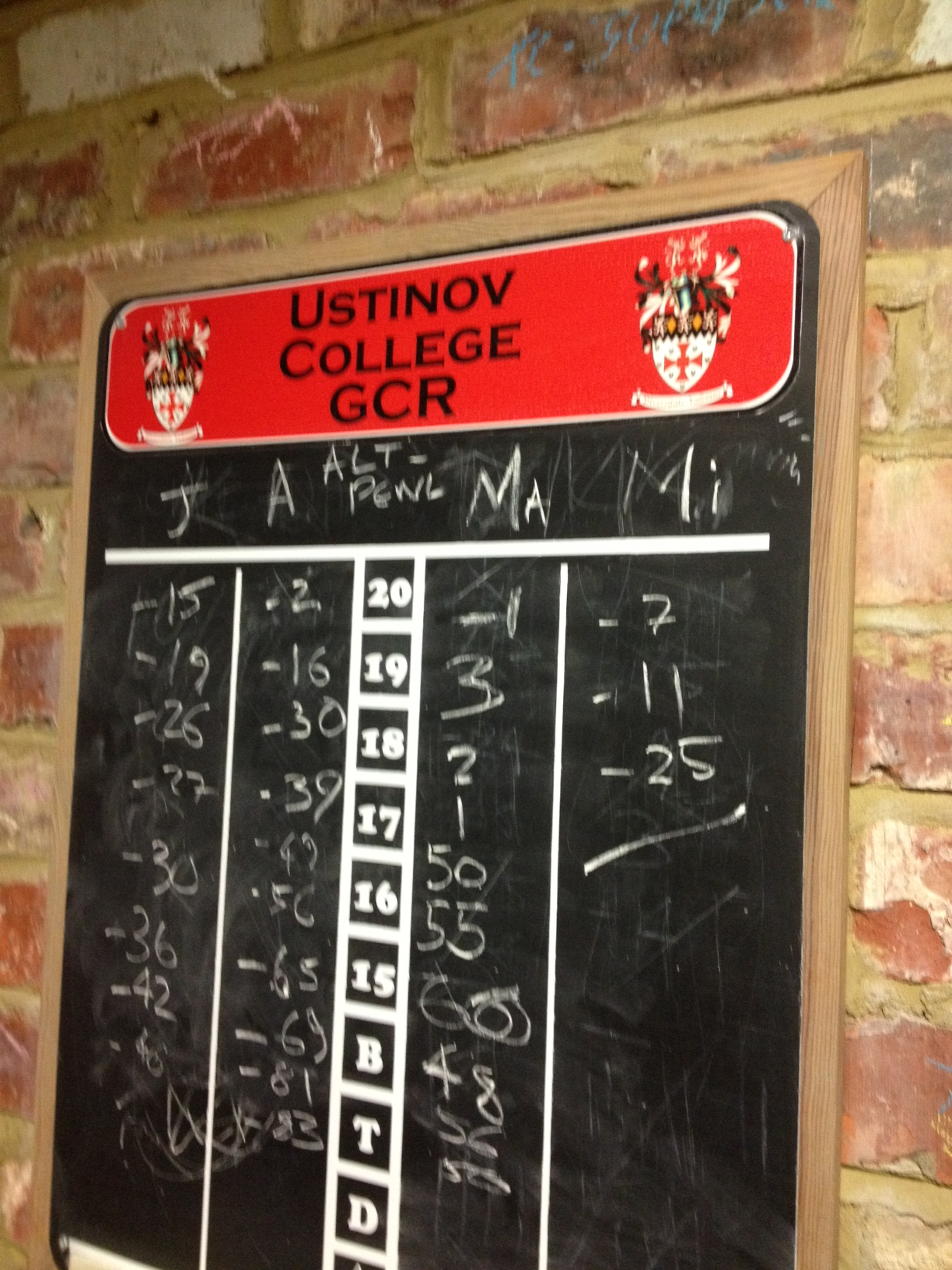
Graduate Common Room pool game

== Academic community ==
Ustinov College is home to an academic community that enables students from departments across the university to engage each other in interdisciplinary dialogue. Current projects in Ustinov's academic community are the Cafe des Arts, Cafe Politique, Cafe Scientifique, Ustinov Seminar, and the Ustinov Intercultural Forum (UIF). In addition to this, a college scholarship is awarded in support of the Race, Crime and Justice Research Group, which connects academics from across the north east of England.

== Other sources ==
- BBC News: College Honour for Ustinov BBC News Article on renaming of the Graduate Society.
- "Sir Peter Ustinov in his own College", University of Durham. Some history in the footnotes
