= Durham Regatta =

Rowing event

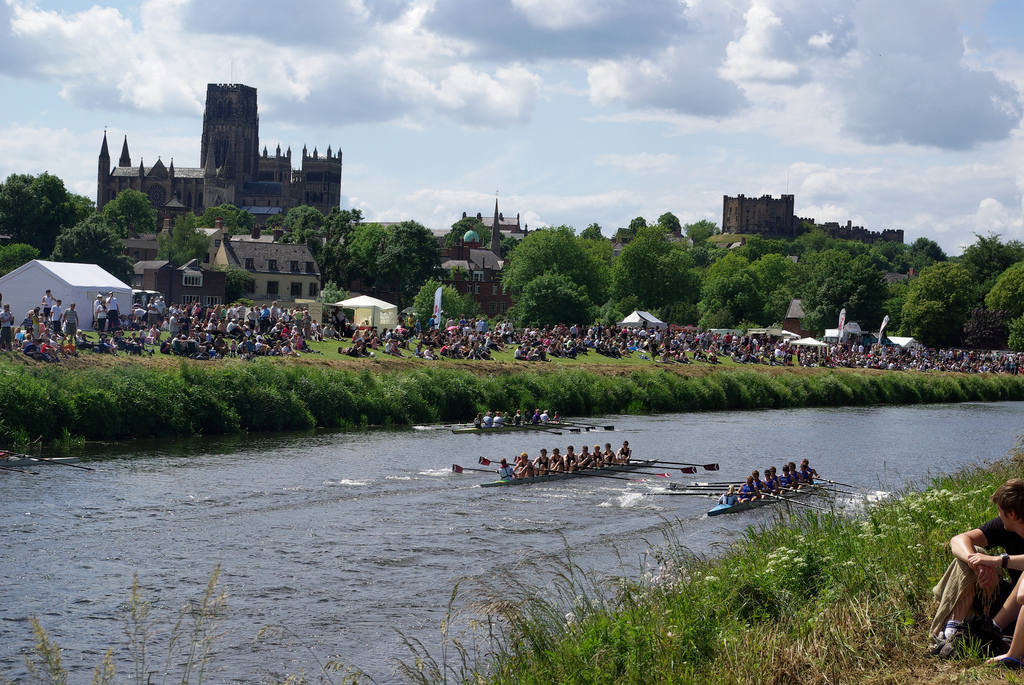
- Durham Regatta 2009 - University College Durham vs Newcastle University
- Genre: Rowing regatta
- Date: Second weekend in June
- Frequency: Annually
- Locations: River Wear, Durham (United Kingdom)
- Inaugurated: 1834; 192 years ago
- Next event: 13 and 14 June, 2026
- Website: www.durham-regatta.org.uk

Durham Regatta is a rowing regatta held annually on the second weekend in June on the River Wear in Durham, North East of England; It is known as the Henley of the North, but began several years before the more prestigious Henley Royal Regatta. Durham Regatta is the second-oldest rowing regatta in England, preceded only by Chester Regatta. The first regatta was held over 17–19 June 1834, opening with a six-oared race in 1834 won by Velocity, owned by W. L. Wharton, High Sheriff of Durham, against the Durham University Original Club in Sylph.

The race has been held 192 times and, in recent years, the regatta has had competitors from all corners of the UK, as well as crews from as far afield as Amsterdam. Almost all colleges of Durham University will compete across a variety of boat types and standards, and it is usually the chance to determine which college has the strongest crews of the year.

== Events ==
Events are competed over either the short (regatta) course, a 700-metre (2,300 ft) stretch of river which provides an excellent view of racing from start to finish, or the long (championship) course. The long course of 1,800 metres (5,900 ft) takes in a number of sweeping bends and Elvet Bridge and ends near Prebends Bridge.

=== Grand Challenge Cup ===
The blue riband event is the Grand Challenge Cup, which has been run since 1854. It has recently been dominated by Durham University Boat Club and Newcastle University Boat Club. This event is for Elite Men's Coxed Fours, and due to the introduction of the Prince Albert Challenge Cup for Men's Student Coxed Fours at Henley Royal Regatta, this event has proved to be useful practice for student crews from the University Boat Club and College Boat Clubs in the run up to the Royal Regatta.

Year	Winner	Beat	Verdict
2002	Durham University Boat Club	Newcastle University Boat Club	5 lengths
2003	Durham University Boat Club	Newcastle University Boat Club	easily
2004	Durham University Boat Club	St Leonard's Boat Club	3 lengths
2005	Durham University Boat Club	ARSR Skadi	2 lengths
2006	Durham University Boat Club	Collingwood College Boat Club	
2007	Durham University Boat Club	ARSR Skadi	
2008	St Aidan's College/Durham University Boat Club composite	Northumbria University Boat Club	easily
2009	Newcastle University Boat Club	Durham University Boat Club	
2010	Durham University Boat Club (Ford)	Durham University Boat Club (Dawes)	3 lengths
2011	Newcastle University Boat Club	John Snow College/Tyne Rowing Club composite	3 lengths
2012	Regatta cancelled		
2013	Durham University Boat Club	Durham Amateur Rowing Club	
2014	Newcastle University Boat Club	Durham University Boat Club	6 lengths
2015	Durham University Boat Club	Newcastle University Boat Club	
2016	Newcastle University Boat Club	Durham University Boat Club	2 lengths
2017	Newcastle University Boat Club	Durham University Boat Club	1/2 canvas
2018	Durham University Boat Club (Gorenkin)	Durham University Boat Club (McGowan)	easily
2019	Regatta cancelled		
2020	Regatta cancelled		
2021	Newcastle University Boat Club	Tyne Amateur Rowing Club	1 length
2022	Lancaster University Boat Club	Tyne Amateur Rowing Club	1 length
2023	Durham University Boat Club (Reed)	Durham University Boat Club (Graf)	missed buoy
2024	Durham University Boat Club	Tyne Amateur Rowing Club	1/2 length
2024	Newcastle University Boat Club	Durham University Boat Club	easily

== Gallery ==
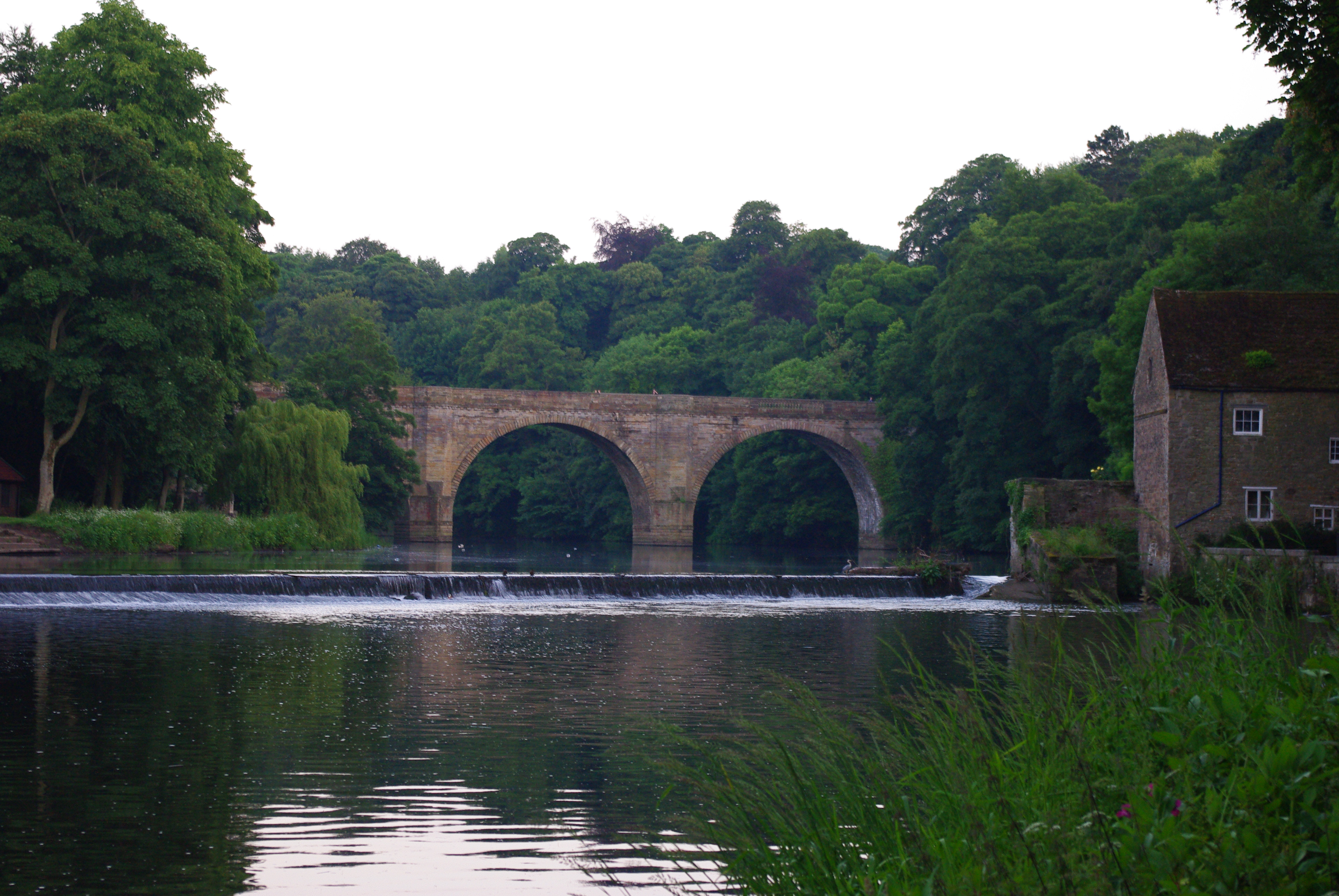
Prebends Bridge from downstream, the finish of the Long Course

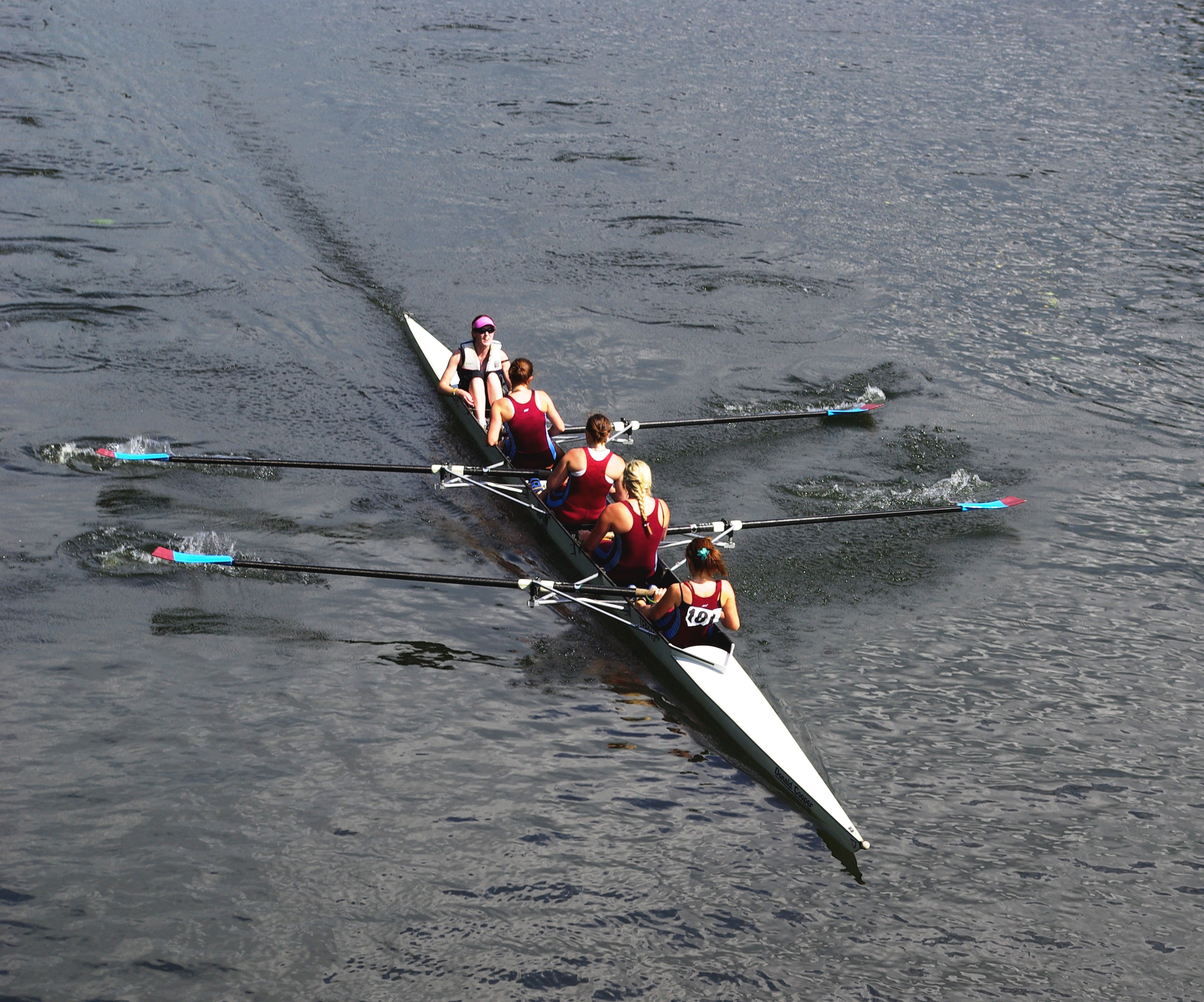
A Women's Coxed Four from Tees rowing club racing

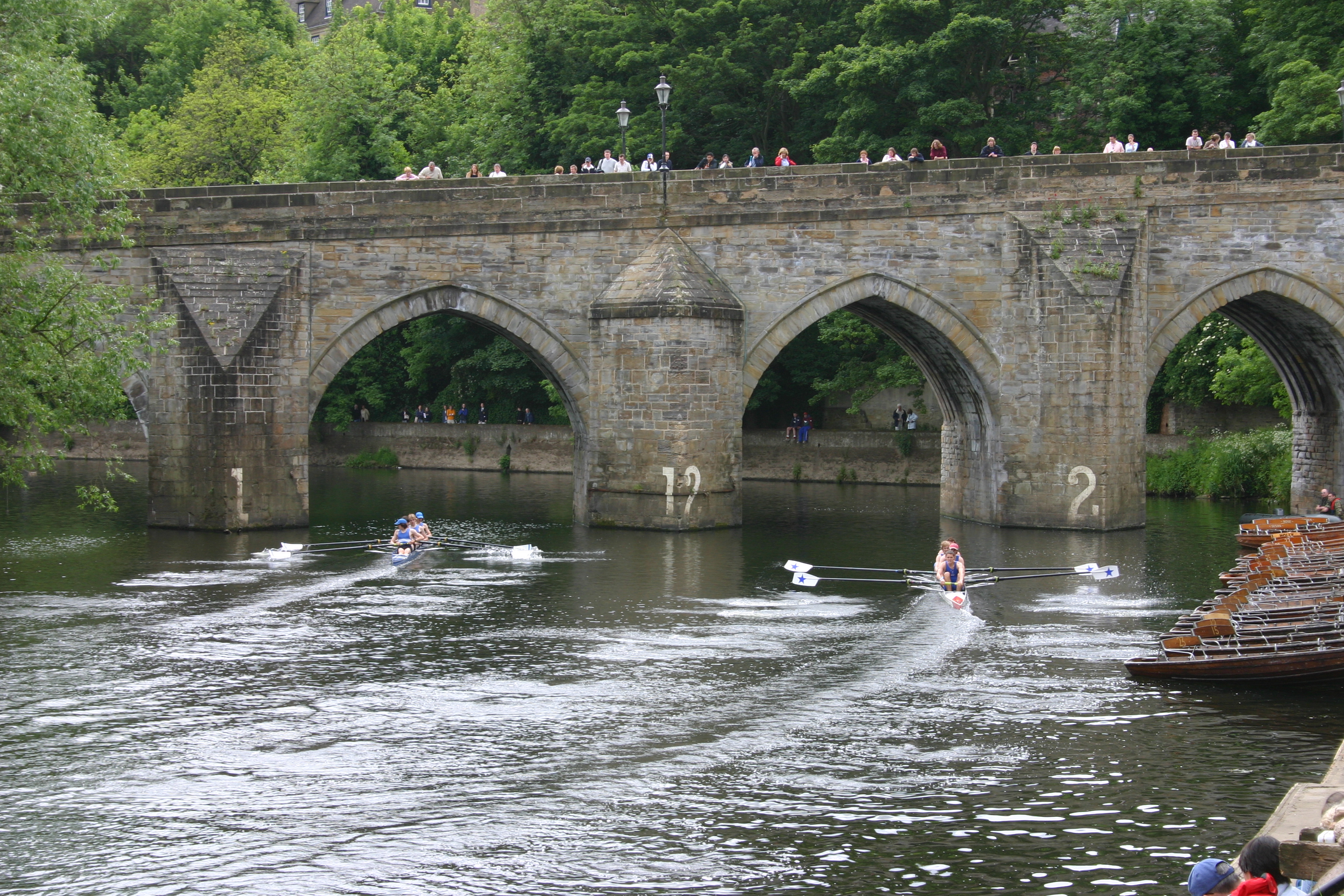
Competitors about to race through Elvet Bridge at the regatta as part of the Long Course (Newcastle University on the right)

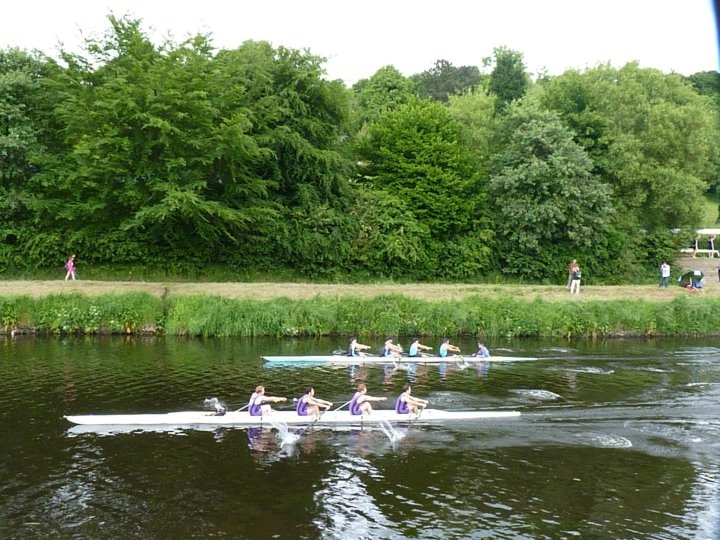
A Durham college Men's Coxed Four race (St. Mary's closest)

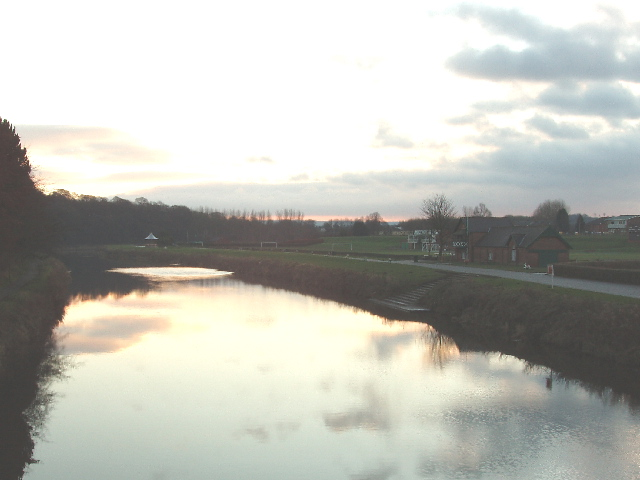
Looking upstream, The Racecourse on the River Wear where the Short Course takes place

== See also ==
- Rowing clubs on the River Wear.
