= Colleges of Durham University =

Seal of the Colleges of University of Durham

The Colleges of Durham University are residential colleges that are the primary source of accommodation and support services for undergraduates and postgraduates at Durham University, as well as providing a focus for social, cultural and sporting life for their members, and offering bursaries and scholarships to students. They also provide funding and/or accommodation for some of the research posts in the University. All students at the University are required to be members of one of the colleges.

Durham University has 17 colleges, of which University College is the oldest, founded in 1832. The newest college is South, founded in 2020. The last single-sex college, St Mary's, became mixed in 2005 with the admittance of male undergraduates. One college, Ustinov, admits only postgraduates. St Chad's and St John's colleges are independent institutions recognised by the university, while the other colleges are directly owned and maintained by the university.

== Colleges ==
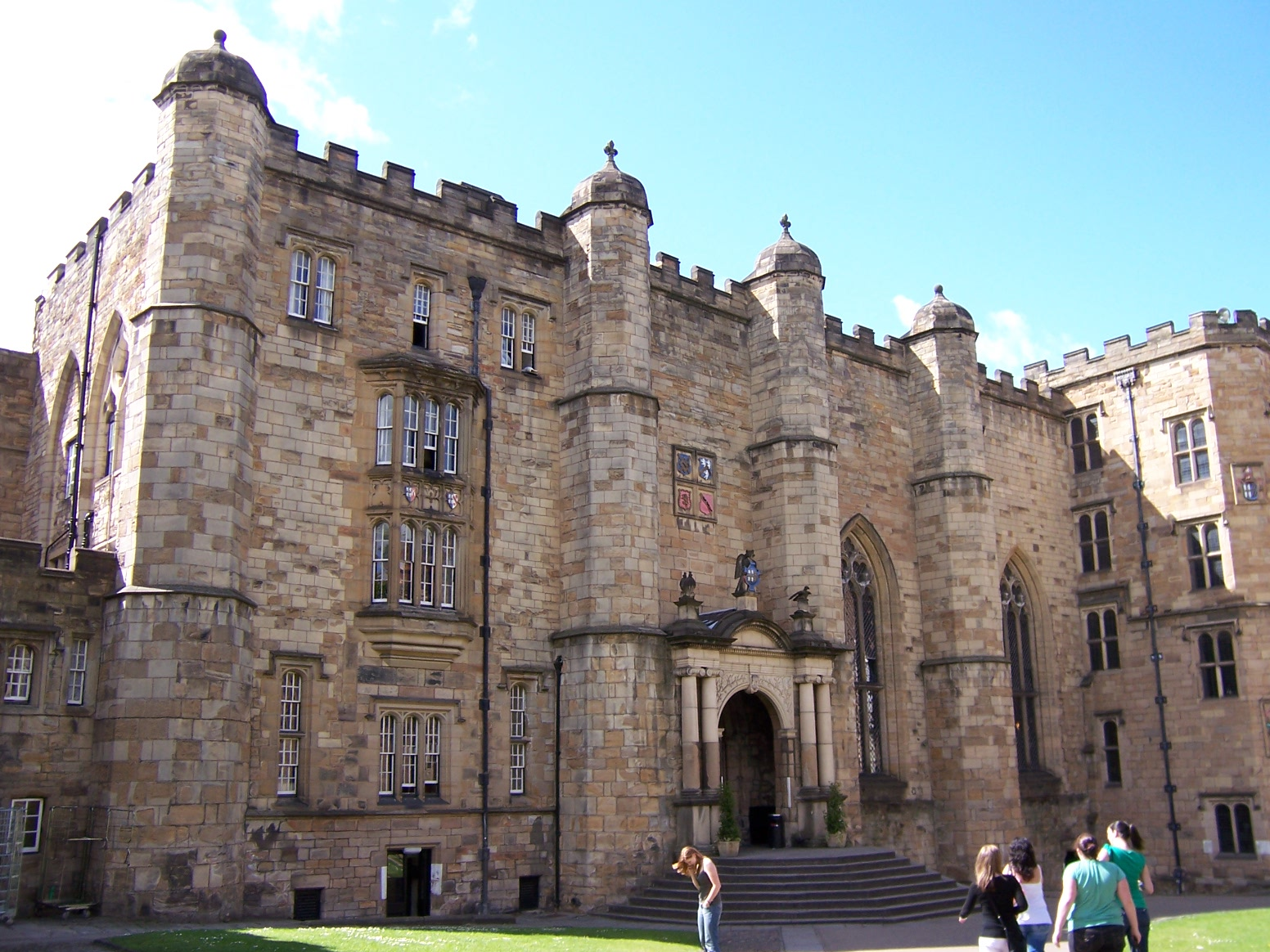
University College, the oldest of the 17 Durham Colleges

Durham operates a collegiate structure similar to that of the University of Oxford and the University of Cambridge, in that all colleges at Durham, being constituent colleges of a "recognised body", are "listed bodies" in the Education (Listed Bodies) (England) Order 2013 made under the Education Reform Act 1988. The "recognised body" in this case is Durham University.

Though most of the Durham colleges are governed and owned directly by the University itself, and so do not enjoy the independence of colleges at Oxford and Cambridge, the status of the Durham colleges is similar to those in Oxford and Cambridge, setting Durham colleges apart from those at the universities of Kent, Lancaster, and York. However, unlike at Oxford and Cambridge (and federal universities such as London and the University of the Highlands and Islands), there is no formal teaching at most Durham colleges (although St John's and St Chad's have their own academic and research staff and offer college-based programmes in conjunction with the University). The colleges dominate the residential, social, sporting, and pastoral functions within the university, and there is heavy student involvement in their operation.

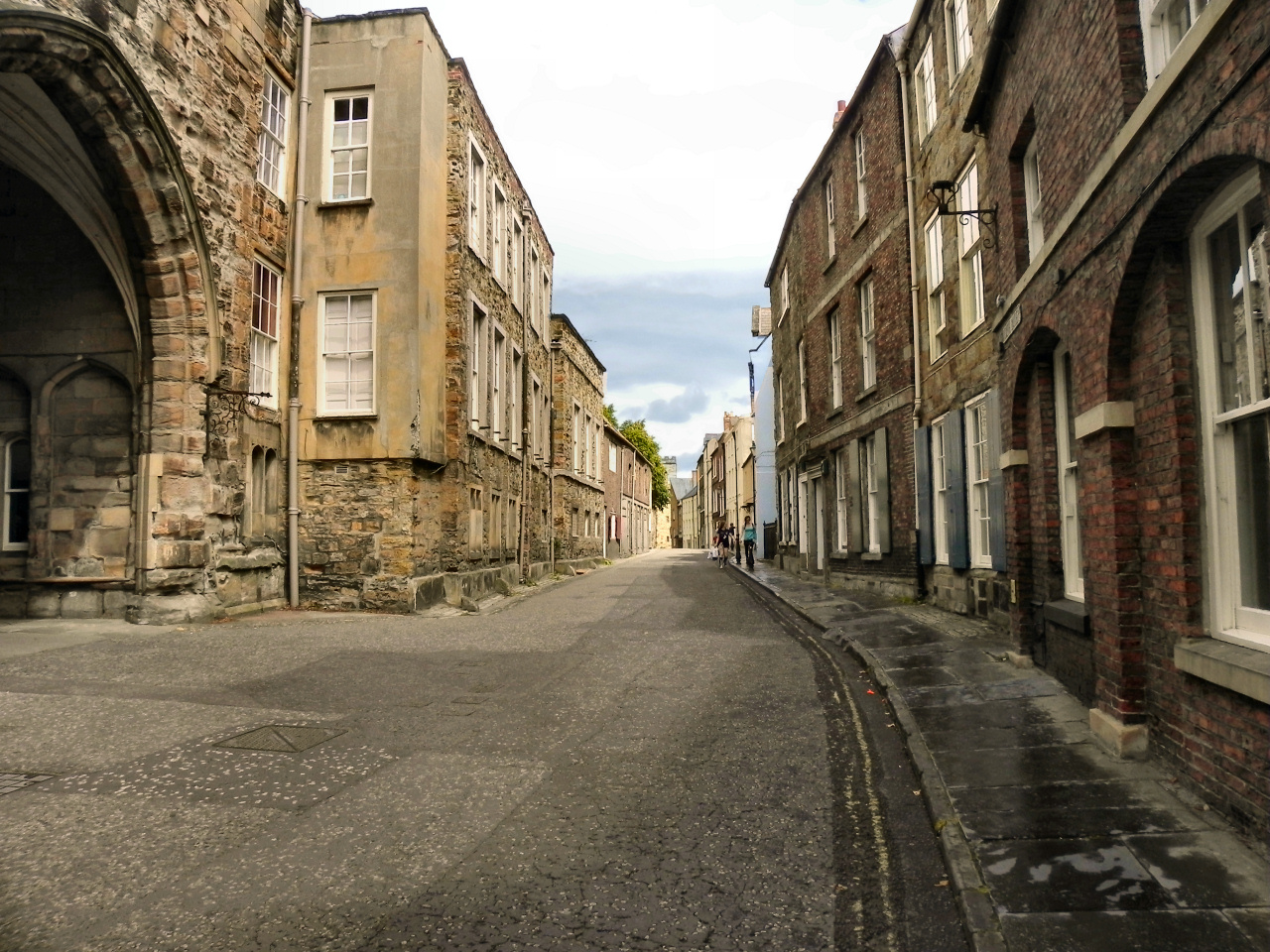
The North Bailey - where some colleges are situated

Formal dinners (known as "formals") are held at many colleges; gowns are often worn to these events. There is a great deal of intercollegiate rivalry, particularly in rowing and other sporting activities. There is also rivalry between the older colleges of the Bailey and the newer colleges of the Hill.

=== Types of college ===
The university is collegiate in structure. There are two different sorts of college: maintained colleges and societies, and recognised colleges. There were previously also licensed halls of residence, and affiliated colleges.

- Maintained colleges are governed directly by, and are financially dependent on, the university. Their principals are appointed by the university council and their staff are employed by the university.
- Recognised colleges (St John's and St Chad's) are 'recognised' as colleges of the University but are incorporated as separate institutions. They are governed, financed and managed independently of the university and are educational charities in their own right. However, as a condition of their ongoing recognition by the university, the university council must approve the appointment of their principals and be notified of changes to their constitutions.
- Licensed halls of residence were, unlike recognised colleges, not recognised as colleges of the university, and their principals were only ex officio members of senate if the hall had 25 or more matriculated students in residence. Under the former statute 14, council might recognise any college within County Durham as a licensed hall of residence; Ushaw College (closed in 2011) and Neville's Cross College (merged into New College Durham in 1977) were both licensed halls of residence of the university. The regulations as to the approval of principals and changes to their constitutions applied to licensed halls in the same way as to recognised colleges.

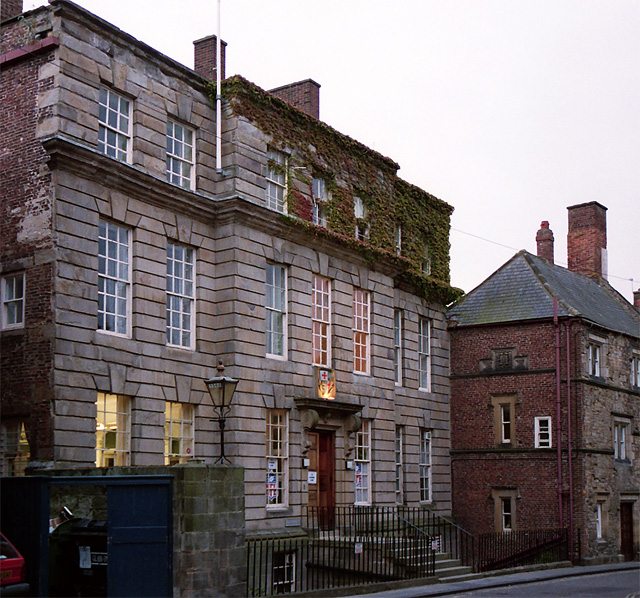
St John's College, one of the two Recognised Colleges

- Affiliated colleges were treated under the former statute 39, rather than under the former statutes 14 & 15 like the other colleges. This stated that council might, on the recommendation of Senate, recognise any college as an affiliated college. Previous affiliated colleges included Codrington College in Barbados, Fourah Bay College in Sierra Leone (now part of the University of Sierra Leone), and Sunderland Technical College (now the University of Sunderland). Affiliated colleges were not generally considered part of the collegiate structure of the university.

The university validates degrees at other colleges not recognised under any of the above categories. Current arrangements include the validation of the Church of England's Common Award at a number of theological colleges. The Royal Academy of Dance also used to teach courses leading to degrees validated by Durham.

=== Hill and Bailey ===
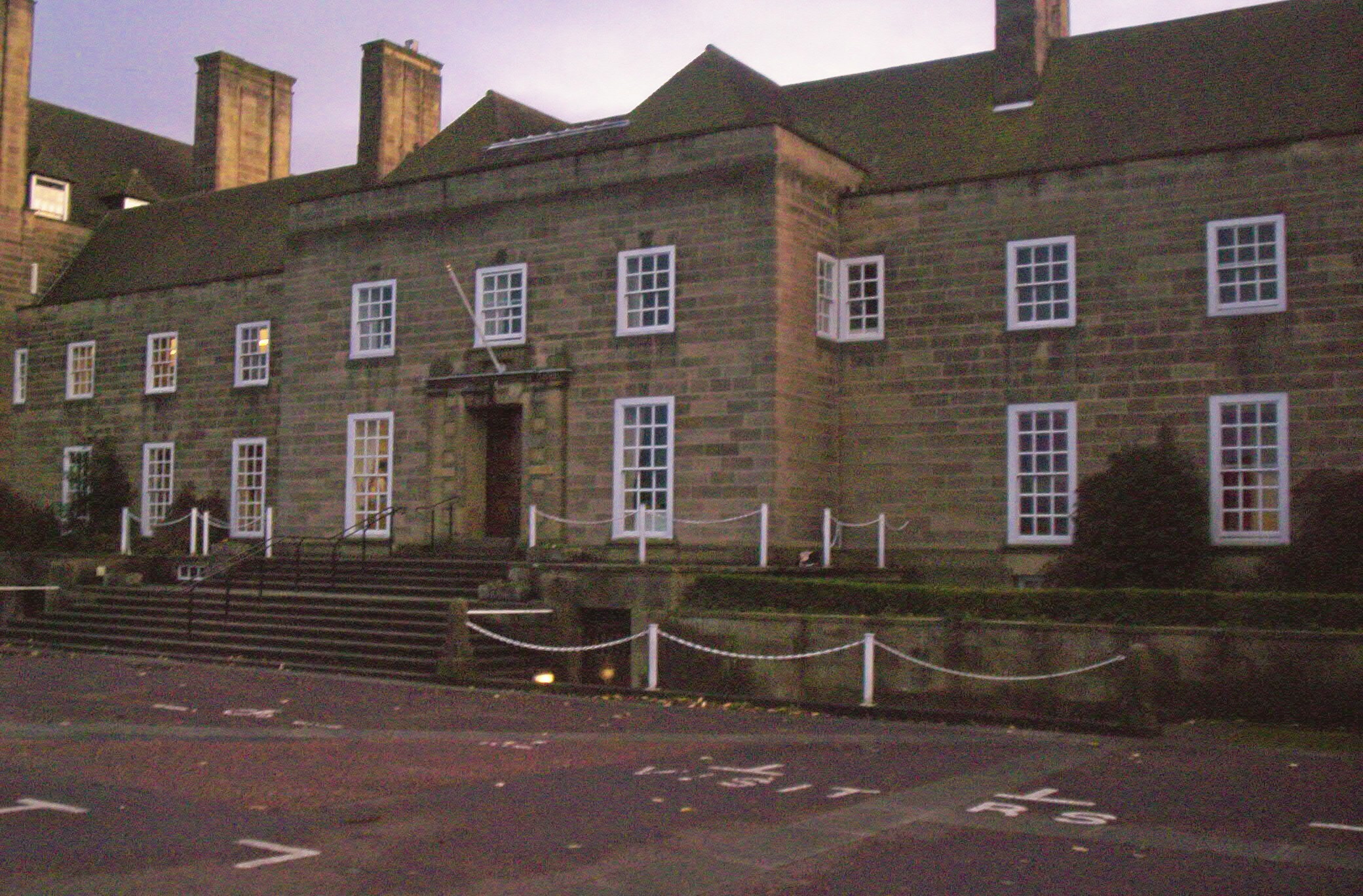
St Mary's College, the oldest of the hill colleges

Most colleges can be classified into two groups: Bailey colleges, located on Durham's peninsula around Durham Cathedral, and Hill colleges on Elvet Hill on the other side of the river.

The five Bailey colleges are located in historic buildings on The Bailey, the peninsula around the castle and cathedral that forms the historic centre of Durham. They include most of the older colleges of the university.

The Hill colleges are located in purpose-built buildings on Elvet Hill to the south of the city, close to the Mountjoy site which houses most of the university's departments and central facilities. The first hill college was St Mary's, which moved in 1952 from the Bailey. All new colleges founded in Durham since then have been on Elvet Hill, and as of 2020 it houses eight colleges, with two more under construction.

Two colleges do not fit into this grouping: the College of St Hild and St Bede, formed in 1975 as a merger of two Victorian teacher training colleges, is located along with the Education Department on Gilesgate, on the opposite side of Durham from Elvet Hill. Ustinov College, the university's sole postgraduate-only college, is based at Sheraton Park on the same side of the city as Elvet Hill but further from the city centre, which was formerly the home of Neville's Cross College.

Some colleges also have accommodation in other parts of the city, most notably St Cuthbert's Society, which has its headquarters on the Bailey but its largest accommodation blocks at the end of Old Elvet, across the river from St Hild and St Bede.

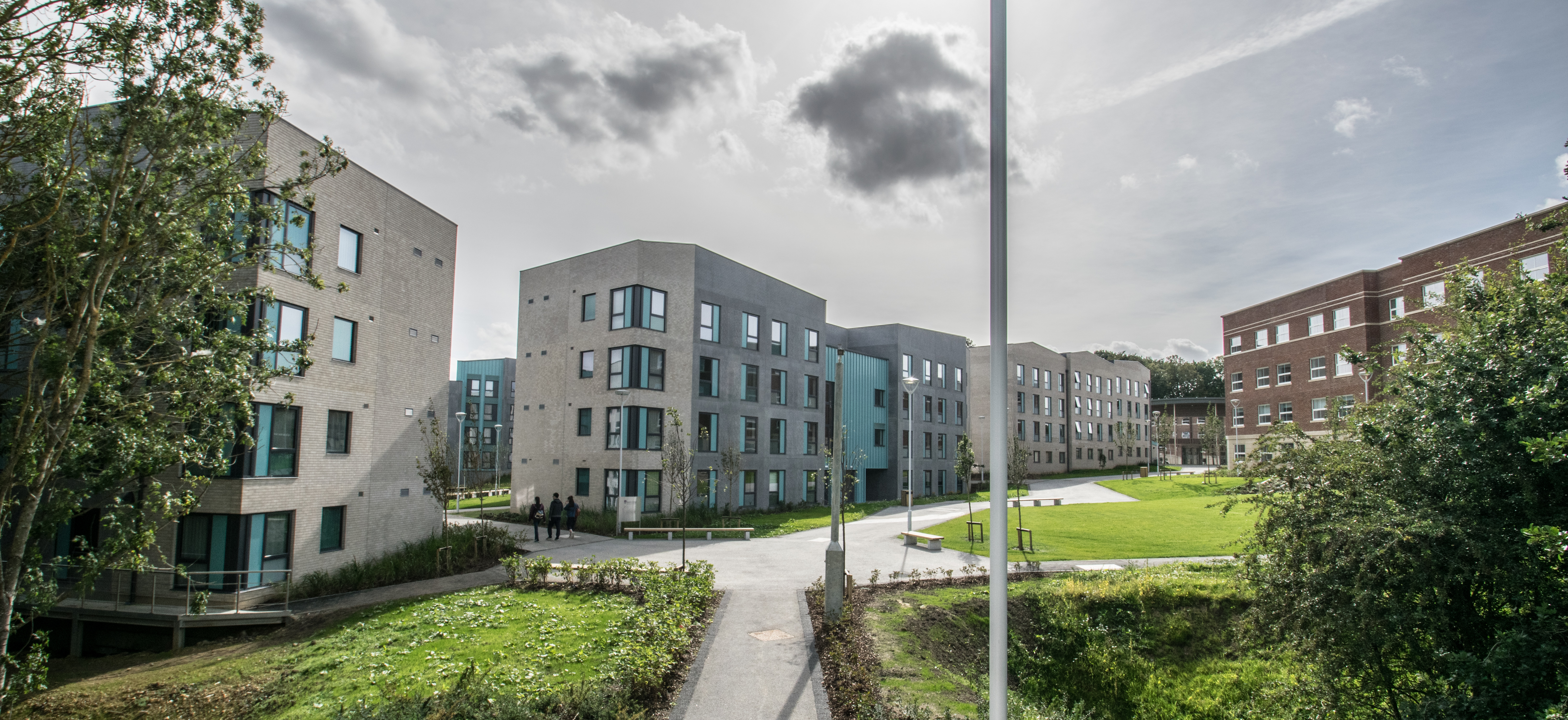
South (left) and John Snow (right) colleges on Mount Oswald

=== Planned colleges ===
The university announced in 2017 its intention to build four to six new colleges by 2027.

The first of these, South College, opened in 2020 on the Mount Oswald site, alongside a new home for John Snow College which relocated from Queen's Campus in 2018.

In 2023, the university announced that it planned to work with the owners of Rushford Court, a private hall of residence, to equip the site with college facilities, to serve as a temporary home for the College of St Hild and St Bede during renovation of its own site, then to become the university's eighteenth college once Hild Bede returned to its own buildings. In May 2024, the university also announced the building of Durham's 19th college, scheduled to start in 2025 neighbouring Hild Bede.

=== College architecture ===
The colleges built on Elvet Hill each have their own distinctive architecture. The first college built in the area, St Mary's in 1952, was designed by Vincent Harris and has been described as both neo-Georgian and domestic-classical. It set a "colleges-in-a-green-landscape" tone that was followed by the other hill colleges, even while their architectural styles varied widely. The next, Grey College (1959) was designed by T. Worthington of Thomas Worthington and Sons. It was built of brick in a domestic Georgian style, and has been called the most architecturally disappointing of the post-war colleges, looking like "a mature suburban housing estate". After this, the remainder of the postwar colleges were built in a variety of modernist styles.

The architect for the concrete St Aidan's College was Sir Basil Spence; the original design called for the brutalist dining hall to be balanced by a chapel, but this was never built. Van Mildert College by Middleton, Fletcher and Partners follows a "conventional modern idiom" with a formal layout around the lake, serrated blocks and cloistered walks. Collingwood College was designed in a functionalist style in brown brick by Sir Richard Sheppard, and shows similarities to his more famous work at Churchill College, Cambridge, but with less ambition and expense. Another, very different, example of functionalist architecture is found at Trevelyan College, where its hexagonal forms, designed by Stillman and Eastwick-Field, won a Civic Trust Award in 1968.

Away from the hill, Hild Bede has a variety of different architectural styles on the Leazes Road site. These include the neo Tudor buildings of Bede College, originally built in 1838, and the former model school, the gothic revival St Hild building from 1858, and the grade II listed art deco Chapel of the Venerable Bede from 1939 by Seely & Paget. Rushford Court, the former County Hospital, is also neo Tudor, built in 1850 to resemble an Elizabethan house.

== List of colleges ==
Since 2018, when university teaching at the university's campus in Stockton-on-Tees finished, all colleges have been located in Durham city.

The student numbers in the table below are up to date for the 2010/11 year.

U = Undergraduates, P = Postgraduates, F = Female, M = Male

Shield	College	Location	Founded	U	P	P/U Ratio	% F	% M	Total	Website	Notes
	Collingwood	Hill	1972	1408	153	0.11	47%	53%	1561		
	Grey	Hill	1959	1129	147	0.13	50%	50%	1276		
	Hatfield	Bailey	1846	1069	260	0.24	50%	50%	1329		Hatfield Hall until 1919.
	John Snow	Hill	2001	705	3	0	60%	40%	708		Founded at Queen's Campus. Moved to Durham in 2017, and to current site in 2020.
	Josephine Butler	Hill	2006	1170	145	0.12	55%	45%	1315		
	South	Hill	2020						492		Expected to grow to 1200 students by 2024.
	St Aidan's	Hill	1947	874	316	0.36	43%	57%	1190		Women home students from 1895; St Aidan's Society 1947-1961.
	St Chad's	Bailey	1904	409	150	0.37	55%	45%	559		Recognised College. St Chad's Hall until 1918.
	St Cuthbert's Society	Bailey	1888	1234	174	0.14	51%	49%	1408		
	St Hild & St Bede	Gilesgate	1975	1123	213	0.19	52%	48%	1336		Merger of the College of the Venerable Bede (1838) and St Hild's College (1858). Recognised College until 1979.
	St John's	Bailey	1909	508	211	0.42	53%	47%	719		Recognised College. St John's Hall until 1919.
	St Mary's	Hill	1899	761	210	0.28	55%	45%	971		Women's Hostel until 1920.
	Stephenson	Hill	2001	830	68	0.08	54%	46%	898		Founded at Queen's Campus. Moved to Durham City in 2017.
	Trevelyan	Hill	1966	784	114	0.15	53%	47%	898		
	University	Bailey	1832	890	442	0.5	52%	48%	1332		Commonly known as Castle.
	Ustinov	Sheraton Park	1965	0	1221	–	51%	49%	1221		Postgraduate-only. Graduate Society until 2003. Moved to current site in 2017.
	Van Mildert	Hill	1965	1266	316	0.25	50%	50%	1582		
Durham University				14160	4143	0.29	52%	48%	18303		

== College arms and colours ==
Each college and societies of the university has its own arms, although in some cases, these were assumed, and later confirmed by the College of Arms. From its foundation until 1954, Hatfield College have its arms assumed from that of Thomas Hatfield, and its display, including the use of Bishop Hatfield's shield, was both inappropriate and illegal. Consequently, it sought a grant of its own from the College of Arms, which was approved. The blazons below are taken from Durham University Statutes and Regulations.

Each college also has its own colours used on items such as scarves and rowing blades.

College	Arms	Blazon	Scarf	Blades
Collingwood College		Argent a Chevron between three Stags' Heads erased Sable a Bordure Gules charged with eight Crosses of St Cuthbert of the field.		
Grey College		Gules a Scaling Ladder in bend Argent between two St Cuthbert's Crosses proper.		
Hatfield College		Azure a Chevron Or between three Lions rampant Argent a Bordure Ermine.		
John Snow College		Argent a Cross formy quadrate azure, a chief azure thereon a Yorkshire rose argent between two lions rampant Or.		
Josephine Butler College		Gules on a chevron Or charged with a Cross formy, with cotises invected, between in chief two lions Argent and in base an open book charged with two covered cups.		
South College		Purpure between an Owl Close Guardant and a Cross Formy Quadrate both Argent a pile inverted conjoined with an orle of the second charged with a Torch enflamed of the first.		White with a violet, grey and teal stripe
St Aidan's College		Per chevron Argent and Sable in chief two ancient Northumbrian Crosses Gules in base two Keys in saltire wards upwards of the first.		
St Chad's College		Vert a Cross potent quadrate Or in chief a Durham Mitre of the last between two Lions rampant Argent.		
St Cuthbert's Society		Vert a representation of St Cuthbert's Cross proper a Bordure Argent.		
College of St Hild and St Bede		Argent on a Chevron Purpure three Ammonites of the first in base a Cross paty quadrate Gules a Chief Azure thereon between two Lions rampant Or a pale of the last charged with a Cross patonce also Azure.		
St John's College		Quarterly Argent and Azure in the first and fourth a Cross Formy Quadrate Gules in the second an Eagle wings elevated and inverted Or in the third a Lion rampant Crowned with an Ancient Crown of the last all within a Bordure quarterly of the second and Gold.		
St Mary's College		Argent a Cross Formy Quadrate Gules a Chief Azure thereon a Durham Mitre Or between two Lilies proper.		
Stephenson College		Argent a chevron between two fleurs-de-lis in chief and a cross fleurettée in gules a chief gules theoreon three lions rampant argent.		
Trevelyan College		Gules issuant from Water in base barry wavy of four Argent and Azure a Demi-Horse forcene Or in chief three Saint Cuthbert's crosses Argent.		
University College		Azure a Cross patonce Or between four Lions rampant Argent on a Chief of the last a Cross of St Cuthbert Sable between two Durham Mitres Gules.		
Ustinov College		Ermine a Cross formy quadrate Gules on a Chief indented Sable between three Lions rampant Argent two Lozenges Or.		
Van Mildert College		Gules two Scythe blades in saltire in chief the Cross of St Cuthbert Argent.		

== Heads of colleges ==
The senior member of each college is an officer known generically as the head of college or head of house. The specific title varies from college to college, as indicated in the list below, but there is no particular significance to the variation. The heads of the maintained colleges are also part-time members of an academic department.

- Principal: Collingwood College, Grey College (formerly master), John Snow College, Josephine Butler College, South College, St Aidan's College (formerly censor and rector), St Chad's College^{†}, St Cuthbert's Society (formerly censor), College of St Hild and St Bede, St John's College, St Mary's College (formerly mistress), Stephenson College, Trevelyan College, Ustinov College, University College (formerly master), Van Mildert College (formerly master)
- Master: Hatfield College

^{†}The principal of St Chad's is also officially known as 'president' (as was the head of Ushaw College). The titular head of that college is known as the 'rector'. Similarly, the chair of the St John's College council is the 'president' of that college.

Heads of colleges
College	Head	Term start
College of St Hild and St Bede	Simon Forrest	2020
Collingwood College	Thom Brooks	2025
Grey College	Sonia Virdee	2023
Hatfield College	Ann MacLarnon	2017
John Snow College	Nathan Sempala-Ntege	2023
Josephine Butler College	Gillian Hampden-Thompson	2023
South College	Tim Luckhurst	2019
St Aidan's College	Susan Frenk	2007
St Chad's College	Margaret Masson	2016
St Cuthbert's Society	Tammi Walker	2021
St John's College	Jolyon Mitchell	2023
St Mary's College	Adrian Simpson	2022
Stephenson College	Katie Stobbs	2025
Trevelyan College	Adekunle Adeyeye	2020
University College	Wendy Powers	2020
Ustinov College	Glenn McGregor	
Van Mildert College	Tom Mole	2021

== Former colleges ==
A number of colleges have been part of Durham University but have since folded or cancelled their association with the university.

Durham University currently recognises seventeen colleges. However, since its foundation in 1832, a number of other colleges have been part of the university. Two of these have become completely defunct; others have ended their association with the university, or left to become independent institutions of their own.

=== Bishop Cosin's Hall ===
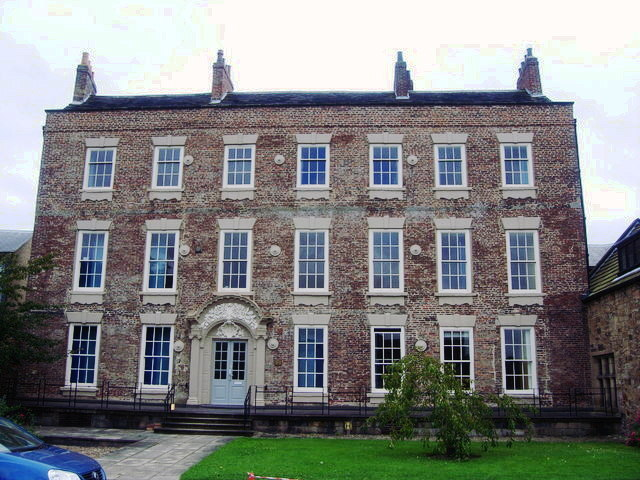
The former home of Bishop's Cosin's Hall, which continues to be known by that name

Bishop Cosin's Hall on Palace Green was opened as the university's third college in 1851. However, a collapse in student numbers in the late 1850s and 1860s meant the university was unable to sustain three colleges at the time, and it was merged into University College in 1864. At the close of the 19th century it became a common room for St. Cuthbert's Society. The building (which had also been the original home of University College before it moved into the castle) is still owned by the university, and was used by University College until 2006, after which it became the home of the Institute of Advanced Study in January 2007.

=== Neville's Cross College ===
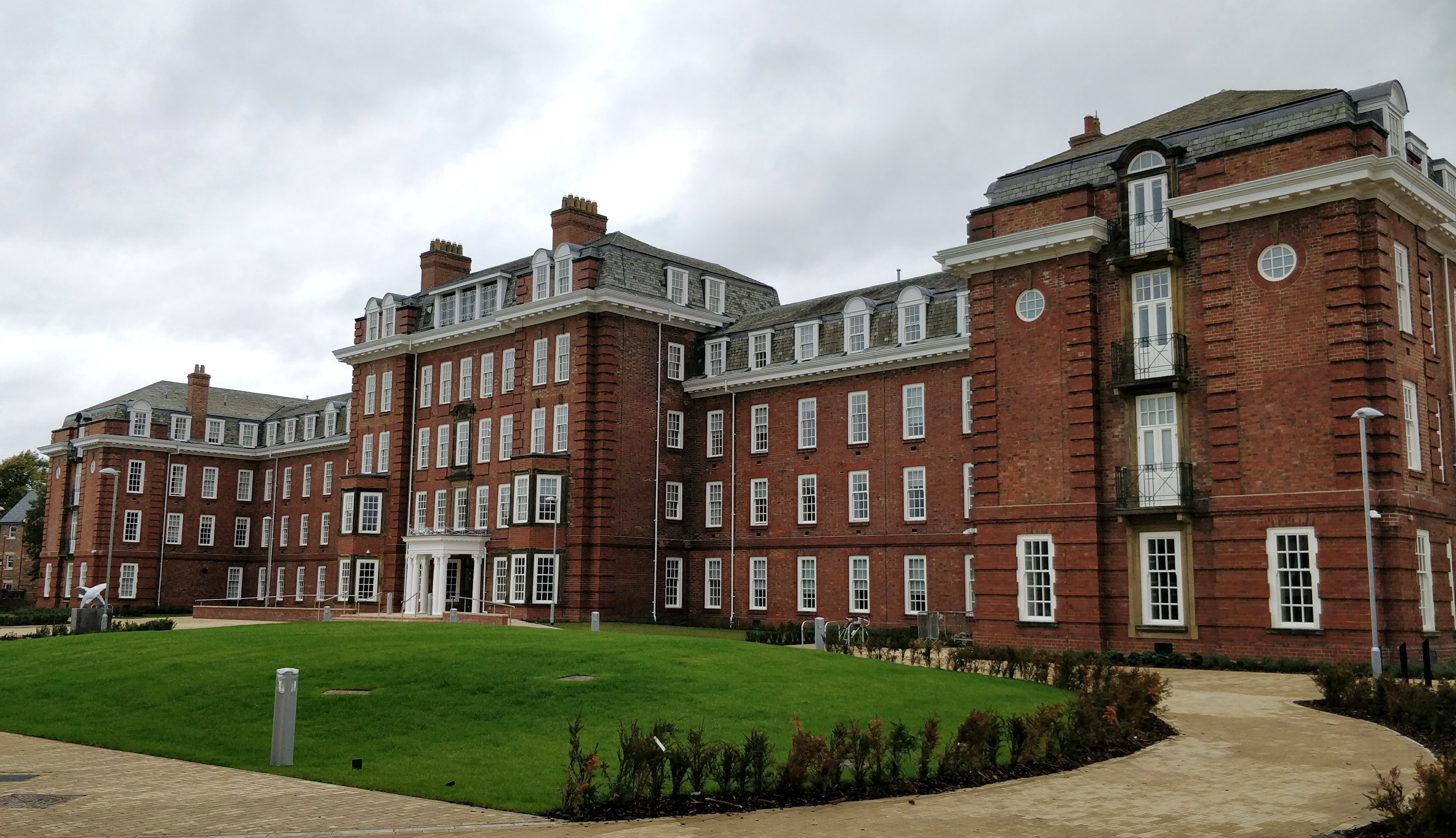
Former buildings of Neville's Cross College, now part of Ustinov College

Neville's Cross College was opened in 1921. It was primarily a teacher-training college, but from 1924 it was also a licensed hall of the University and admitted students to read for both undergraduate courses and postgraduate degrees.

The college merged with Durham Technical College in 1977 to form New College Durham, whereupon it ceased to be associated with the University. The former site of the college in Sheraton Park became home to the University's Ustinov College in 2017.

=== Ushaw College ===
Arms of Ushaw College

Ushaw College was a Catholic seminary located in Ushaw Moor, a village to the west of Durham. It was opened in 1808 by scholars who had fled from Douai, France, when English College was forced to close during the French Revolution. It affiliated with Durham as 'Licensed Hall' in 1968, though it retained its role primarily as a seminary. It shut as a seminary in 2011 due to a declining number of vocations in the Catholic Church. Part of the college is now used by Durham Business School, and it is also used for conferences and lectures by the Department of Theology and Religion.

=== Colleges in Newcastle ===
Armstrong College Shield

In 1852, the School of Medicine and Surgery (founded in 1834) in Newcastle upon Tyne was absorbed into the University of Durham as the College of Medicine, allowing students to study for the Licence in Medicine in Durham, after which students could practise Medicine and take the degrees of Bachelor and Doctor in Medicine. At the same time, Neville Hall was opened in Newcastle 'for the reception of Students in Medicine'. The Hall closed at the end of the academic year in 1855/56. In 1871, the College of Medicine was joined by the College of Physical Science, later renamed Armstrong College.

College of Medicine Shield

Relations between the two campuses were often strained. They became two autonomous parts of the same university, with the Newcastle colleges merging to become King's College in 1937. In 1947 a proposal to rename the university as the "University of Durham and Newcastle" was approved by all the governing bodies, but was defeated at convocation by 135 votes to 129 in the spring of 1952. This defeat led to King's College eventually leaving the university, to create the new University of Newcastle upon Tyne in 1963.

Development of the Newcastle Colleges of Durham University
School of Medicine and Surgery; 1834	Newcastle upon Tyne College of Medicine, in connection with the University of Durham; 1852	Durham University College of Medicine; 1870	King's College; 1937 - 1963
College of Physical Science; 1871	Durham College of Science; 1883	Armstrong College; 1904	King's College; 1937 - 1963

==== Presidents of the College of Medicine ====
- 1851-1864 Thomas Emerson Headlam
- 1864-1872 Charles Thomas Whitley
- 1872-1874 Edward Charlton
- 1874-1892 George Yeoman Heath
- 1892-1918 George Hare Philipson
- 1918-1926 David Drummond
- 1926-1934 Thomas Oliver
- 1935-1937 Robert Bolam

==== Principals of the College of Science ====
- 1871-1879 William Steadman Aldis (acting)
- 1879-1884 William Steadman Aldis (actual)
- 1884-1893 William Garnett
- 1893-1894 Vacancy
- 1894-1904 Henry Palin Gurney
- 1904-1909 Isambard Owen
- 1909-1919 William Henry Hadow
- 1919-1929 Theodore Morison
- 1929-1937 William Sinclair Marris

==== Rectors of King's College ====
- 1937-1951 Lord Eustace Percy
- 1951-1963 Charles Bosanquet (first vice-chancellor of Newcastle University)

=== Sunderland Technical College ===
Sunderland Technical College was affiliated to Durham from 1930 to 1963 in the Faculty of Applied Science, and was thus associated with the Newcastle division of the University. When the Newcastle division became Newcastle University in 1963, Sunderland's affiliation with Durham ended. In 1969 the Technical College merged with Sunderland Teacher Training College and the Sunderland School of Art to form Sunderland Polytechnic (now the University of Sunderland).

=== University College Stockton ===
Originally established in 1992 as the Joint University College On Teesside (JUCOT), a limited company established as a joint venture between Durham and the University of Teesside operating under the name of University College Stockton, this became a teaching and residential college of Durham in 1994 as University College Stockton (UCS), the JUCOT company being wound up. In 1998 the teaching and residential aspects were separated, with teaching becoming the responsibility of the University of Durham, Stockton Campus. In 2001 UCS was replaced by two new colleges, Stephenson and John Snow.

==== Principals of University College Stockton ====
- 1992 – 1994 Robert Parfitt
- 1994 – 2001 John Hayward

== Colleges abroad ==
Arms of Fourah Bay College

Durham University has had two affiliated colleges outside England. Of these, Fourah Bay College is a former part of the university, having ended its affiliation in 1967. It became a constituent college of the University of Sierra Leone on that date. The other affiliate, Codrington College, remained listed as an affiliated college until removed in the revision of the university's statutes approved by the Queen in Council on 13 July 2011.

== Renamed and merged Colleges ==
The College of St Hild and St Bede was formed from the merger of two separate colleges in 1975. The College of the Venerable Bede (usually known as Bede College) had been an all-male college formed in 1838, with St Hild's College formed as an all-female college in 1858. The merged college continued as a recognised college until 1979, when it was taken over by the university and became a maintained college. Prior to this, the two colleges had specialised in the teaching of education; on becoming a maintained college the teaching part of Hild Bede was separated from the college to become the university's School of Education.

The Graduate Society became a full college in 2003 and was subsequently renamed Ustinov College. The Home Students Association (for non-collegiate women) became St Aidan's Society in 1947 and subsequently St Aidan's College in 1961. Hatfield College was originally established as Bishop Hatfield's Hall, taking on its current name in 1919. St Mary's College was founded as the Women's Hostel, becoming a college and taking its current name in 1920.

Stephenson College (originally George Stephenson College) and John Snow College were created in 2001. They replaced the original University College Stockton and were located on the Queen's Campus at Stockton-on-Tees.

== Fictitious colleges ==
Jesus College and Coverdale Hall are the settings for the events in Angels and Men, Durham alumna Catherine Fox's first novel (published by Hamish Hamilton in 1996). The location is nowhere stated explicitly, but it is obvious to anyone familiar with the city and the university that it takes place in Durham; Jesus and Coverdale are modelled (very closely) on St John's College and Cranmer Hall.

That Hideous Strength (1943) by C. S. Lewis is set in a fictional university town, whose resemblance to Durham is close enough to require Lewis to insist in the book's preface that it is not so.

== See also ==
- Armorial of British universities § Durham colleges
- Colleges of the University of Cambridge
- Colleges of the University of Oxford
- Colleges of the University of York
