= Durham University School of Medicine, Pharmacy and Health =

Former academic department of Durham University

- Active: 2001–2017
- Parent institution: University of Durham
- Dean: APS Hungin OBE
- Location: Thornaby, Stockton-on-Tees, England
- Campus: Queen's Campus, University of Durham
- Website: www.dur.ac.uk/school.health/

Durham University School of Medicine, Pharmacy and Health was founded on Teesside in 2001 as a partner with the Newcastle University Medical School to educate medical students in the first phase of their medical education (Years 1 and 2). On 1 August 2017 it was transferred to Newcastle University, becoming part of Newcastle's Faculty of Medical Sciences and relocating to Newcastle.

The School of Medicine, Pharmacy and Health was located on the Queen's Campus of the University of Durham, with students being members of one of the two colleges on this campus - John Snow and George Stephenson College.

In July 2016 it was announced that the school would be fully transferred to Newcastle University to "ensure a coherent and sustainable regional medical education provision for the future". The Queen's Campus will remain in the ownership of Durham University. Pharmacy students were transferred to Newcastle for the 2017/18 academic year while the 2016/17 MBBS intake was taught out in Stockton in 2017/18.

== Admissions ==
The yearly intake quota for medical students at Durham was 102, 95 home student places and 7 Overseas places.

The conditional offer given to a student taking A-Level examinations was AAA, to include Biology and/or Chemistry at A-Level, and whichever may be missing at AS-Level. Since October 2007 entrants must take the UKCAT prior to applying, an exam aimed at facilitating choosing between similarly high-achieving applicants, akin to the BMAT.

As with all UK medical students, successful applicants must have proof of immunity or non-infectivity against Hepatitis B, Diphtheria, Polio, Rubella, Tetanus, Varicella and Tuberculosis. Without complete immunisation, offers may be withdrawn.

== Case-led curriculum ==
At Durham, students had the traditional medical sciences taught alongside their clinical relevance. For example, just before learning the physiology of the lungs, a case was presented about a girl admitted to an Accident and Emergency department with shortness of breath and other symptoms of asthma. Once the topic had been taught, a "case round-up session" was held, where formative questions were asked, some with more clinical relevance.

The curriculum also meant that while, for example, learning the physiology of the lungs, their anatomy and embryological development were also taught by other departments (anatomy and embryology respectively).

The curriculum was broadly taught in the following strands, with some departments spanning many, for example, anatomy and embryology:

- Cardiovascular, Respiratory and Renal Medicine (CVRR)
- Medicine in the Community (MiC)
- Personal and Professional Development (PPD)
- Life Cycle (LC)
- Foundation Case (CF)
- Clinical Sciences and Investigative Medicine (CSIM)
- Thoughts, Senses and Movements (TSM) (Formerly known as Neurological and Skeletomotor Systems)
- Nutrition, Metabolism and Endocrinology (NME)
- Student Selected Component (SSC)

The Foundation Case was only taught in the first three weeks of the course in the first year, and its aim was to integrate the fundamental parts of preclinical medicine. During this time, a sufferer of the disease studied, cystic fibrosis (hence the abbreviation CF), paid a visit to the medical school and students posed questions of the disease's impact on the individual and their family.

This integrated curriculum also had implications for the students, in that they had very early patient contact, some within weeks, in the form of the Family Project, where students followed a pregnant woman through her pregnancy and into the first few months of life of the newborn in groups of two or three, and also in the form of hospital visits.

== Staff ==
APS Hungin OBE was the Dean of Medicine & Head of the School of Medicine, Pharmacy and Health, and JC McLachlan was the Academic Director.

Each strand of the course had a strand leader, and many of those that lecture to the undergraduates were either not from the School for Health (generally Biological and Biomedical Sciences or Anthropology, both of whose courses span both campuses) or were from outside the University (e.g. clinical lecturers were practising clinicians in NHS hospitals).

== Progression from Durham ==
After completing the two-year preclinical course at Queen's Campus, the vast majority of students joined their University of Newcastle contemporaries in one of four base units in the North East of England for their clinical teaching:

- Teesside
- Wearside
- Tyneside
- Northumbria

Students had the chance to assign preferences for stage 3 (phase 2) base units, with Newcastle University providing randomization and assignment based on student preference, and their place in the generated list. Options were provided to swap assigned base units with another student of the same stage if both parties were willing. It was not possible to go to the same base unit for stage 3 and stage 5 unless a case was presented to Newcastle medical school for this requirement.

There was the opportunity to intercalate a BSc after the second year, either at the University of Durham or the University of Newcastle. The possibility also existed after the 4th year to complete a master's degree at Newcastle University, or, if permission was given by Newcastle University, at an external institution.

After successful completion of Phase 2 (Years 3-5), the University of Newcastle conferred the degrees MB BS (Medicinæ Baccalaureus and Bachelor of Surgery) upon students

== UDQC MedSoc ==
UDQC (University of Durham Queen's Campus) Medsoc (Medical Society) played an integral role in the lives of students on Queen's Campus, organising nights out to Durham and Newcastle, but also raising money for charities like Marrow UK. It also had many sports teams, which, despite the small size of the medical school (both in terms of numbers of years and yearly intake) were on par with many, much larger, medical schools.

MedSoc also produced an alternative welcome pack for 1st years before they arrived in October, which also gave a student's perspective of the recommended texts.
