= Head of college =

Head or senior member of a college within a collegiate university

A head of college or head of house is the head or senior member of a college within a collegiate university. The title used varies between colleges, including dean, master, president, principal, provost, rector and warden.

The role of the head of college varies significantly between colleges of the same university, and even more so between different universities. However, the head of college will often have responsibility for leading the governing body of the college, often acting as a chair of various college committees; for executing the decisions of the governing body through the college's organisational structure, acting as a chief executive; and for representing the college externally, both within the government of the university and further afield often in aid of fund-raising for the college. The nature of the role varies in importance depending on the nature of the central university. At a loosely federated university such as the University of London or the National University of Ireland, where each member institution is self-governing and some hold university status in their own right, the head of each institution has the same level of responsibility as the vice-chancellor of a university. At more centralised universities, the heads of colleges have less power and responsibility.

== University governance ==
Heads of colleges will often participate in the governance of the central university. Mechanisms for this vary between university and include:

- The Collegiate Council at the University of London, which advises the Board of Trustees and is responsible for academic affairs.
- The Conference of Colleges at the University of Oxford, the chair of which and one other member sit on the university council.
- Four places on the university council at the University of Cambridge reserved for heads of colleges.
- Ex officio membership of the senate for all heads of colleges at Durham University, Lancaster University and the University of Roehampton.
- The Partnership Council at the University of the Highlands and Islands.
- Joint appointments of heads of colleges as pro vice-chancellors and members of the university executive board at University of the Arts London.

== Terminology ==
Many different titles are used for heads of colleges. These have also changed with time, in particularly the recent move away from using master by colleges at Durham, Kent (where the position of head of college was abolished), Rice, Yale and Harvard universities. At the University of York, the post of principal (head of college) was abolished in 2023, with the senior college fellow becoming the chair of the college council and operational powers delegated to the college manager.

Title	Parent institution	College, member institution, etc.
Chief Executive	University of the Highlands and Islands	UHI Argyll, UHI Inverness (held jointly with the title of principal in both cases)
Chief Executive	University of London	Institute of Cancer Research (held jointly with the title of president)
College Magister	Rice University	All colleges (changed from master in 2017)
Dean	University of London	London Business School
Dean	University of Oxford	Christ Church – the Dean of Christ Church, Oxford is dean of both the college and Christ Church Cathedral.
Director	University of the Highlands and Islands	Scottish Association for Marine Science
Director	University of London	Courtauld Institute of Art and London School of Hygiene & Tropical Medicine
Faculty Dean	Harvard College	All houses (changed from master in 2016)
Head	University of the Arts London	Camberwell, Chelsea and Wimbledon colleges (joint head of all three institutions), the London College of Fashion and the London College of Communication
Head	University of Roehampton	Froebel College
Head of College	University of the Arts London	Central St Martins
Head of College	Princeton University	All colleges
Head of College	University of Roehampton	Digby Stuart College, Whitelands College and Southlands College
Head of College	Yale University	All colleges (changed from master in 2016)
House Professor	Dartmouth College	All houses
Master	University of Cambridge	Christ's College, Churchill College, Clare College, Corpus Christi College, Darwin College, Downing College, Emmanuel College, Fitzwilliam College, Gonville and Caius College, Jesus College, Magdalene College, Pembroke College, Peterhouse, St Catharine's College, St Edmund's College, St John's College, Selwyn College, Sidney Sussex College, Trinity College and Trinity Hall
Master	Durham University	Hatfield College (Principal until 1919)
Master	University of Oxford	Balliol College, Campion Hall, Pembroke College, St Catherine's College, St Cross College, St Peter's College, University College
Mistress	University of Cambridge	Girton College
President	University of Cambridge	Clare Hall, Hughes Hall, Lucy Cavendish College, Murray Edwards College, Queens' College and Wolfson College
President	University of Dublin	Trinity College (held jointly with the title of provost)
President	University of London	City, Institute of Cancer Research (held jointly with the title of chief executive), King's College London (held jointly with the title of principal), London School of Economics (held jointly with the title of vice-chancellor), Queen Mary (held jointly with the title of principal), SOAS and University College London (held jointly with the title of provost)
President	National University of Ireland	All constituent universities and recognised colleges
President	University of Oxford	Corpus Christi College, Kellogg College, Magdalen College, Reuben College, St John's College, Trinity College and Wolfson College
Principal	University of Cambridge	Homerton College and Newnham College
Principal	Durham University	Collingwood College (changed from master between 1985 and 1989), Grey College (changed from master in April 2023), John Snow College, Josephine Butler College, South College, St Aidan's College, St Chad's College, (also has a rector as "titular and religious head of the college") St Cuthbert's Society, the College of St Hild and St Bede, St John's College, St Mary's College, Stephenson College, Trevelyan College, University College (changed from master in 2020), Ustinov College and Van Mildert College (changed from master between 1985 and 1989)
Principal	University of the Highlands and Islands	UHI Argyll, UHI Inverness (held jointly with the title of chief executive in both cases), Highland Theological College, UHI Outer Hebrides, UHI Moray, UHI Shetland, UHI North Highland, Orkney College UHI, UHI Perth, Sabhal Mòr Ostaig, UHI West Highland
Principal	Lancaster University	All colleges
Principal	University of London	King's College London (held jointly with the title of president), Queen Mary (held jointly with the title of president), the Royal Academy of Music, the Royal Central School of Speech and Drama, Royal Holloway, the Royal Veterinary College and St George's (held jointly with the title of vice-chancellor)
Principal	University of Oxford	Brasenose College, Green Templeton College, Harris Manchester College, Hertford College, Jesus College, Lady Margaret Hall, Linacre College, Mansfield College, Regent's Park College, St Anne's College, St Edmund Hall, St Hilda's College, St Hugh's College, St Stephen's House, Somerville College and Wycliffe Hall
Principal	University of South Wales	Royal Welsh College of Music and Drama
Principal	University of Toronto	Massey College (changed from master in 2018)
Provost	University of California, San Diego	All colleges
Provost	University of California, Santa Cruz	All colleges
Provost	University of Cambridge	King's College
Provost	University of Dublin	Trinity College (held jointly with the title of president)
Provost	University of London	University College London (held jointly with the title of president)
Provost	University of Oxford	Oriel College, Queen's College and Worcester College
Rector	University of Notre Dame	All halls
Rector	University of Oxford	Exeter College and Lincoln College
Regent	University of Oxford	Blackfriars
Vice-chancellor	University of London	Birkbeck, London School of Economics (held jointly with the title of president) and St George's (held jointly with the title of principal)
Warden	University of Cambridge	Robinson College
Warden	University of London	Goldsmiths
Warden	University of Oxford	All Souls College, Keble College, Merton College, New College, Nuffield College, St Antony's College and Wadham College

In the case of some older colleges whose statutes are in Latin, the titles used in the modern era are English translations of those found in the statutes, e.g. "provost" for praepositus, "president" for praeses, and "warden" for custos.
