= Martyn Evans (philosopher) =

Welsh academic and philosopher

H. Martyn Evans is a Welsh academic and Professor of Philosophy of Music and Member of the School of Medicine and Health at the University of Durham. From 2002 to 2008, he was Principal of John Snow College, Durham. From 2008 to 2019, he was Principal of Trevelyan College, Durham.

== Career ==
Professor Evans started his career at the University of Wales, Swansea, where he became Senior Lecturer in the Centre for Philosophy and Healthcare. He has a doctorate in the Philosophy of Music.

He joined Durham in 2002 where he became the first Principal of John Snow College, in 2008 he became Principal of Trevelyan College. His current academic positions include being the Co-Director Centre for Medical Humanities at the School of Medicine and Health as well as the Centre for the Medical Humanities and a Fellow of the Wolfson Research Institute.

He had been a visiting fellow at the University of Sydney. He is currently a visiting professor at the University of Otago and joint editor of the Medical Humanities journal. He is an Honorary Fellow of Royal College of General Practitioners (RCGP) and the Royal College of Physicians. He sits on the Wellcome Trust Medical Humanities Strategy Committee and RCGP Ethics Committee.

He has authored or co-authored 30 scientific/philosophical papers.

He has a wife and two sons.

== Bibliography ==
- Symptom: Medical Humanities Companion Volume One, Oxford: Radcliffe Publishing, 2008 (co-editor/co-author)
- Diagnosis: Medical Humanities Companion Volume Two, Oxford: Radcliffe Publishing, 2010 (co-editor/co-author)
- A Decent Proposal: Ethical Review of Clinical Research, Chicester: John Wiley & Sons, 1996 (co-author)
- Listening to Music, London: Macmillan, 1990 (sole author)
- Philosophy for Medicine: applications in a clinical context, Oxford: Radcliffe Medical Press, 2004(co-editor)
- Medical Humanities. “Philosophy and the medical humanities”, London: BMJ Books, 2001 (co-editor)
- Critical Reflections on Medical Ethics, Connecticut USA: JAI Publishers, 1998 (editor)

Academic offices
New title	Principal of John Snow College, Durham; 2002 to 2008	Succeeded by Carolyn Summerbell
Preceded by Nigel Martin	Principal of Trevelyan College, Durham; 2008 to present	Incumbent
