= Rushford Court =

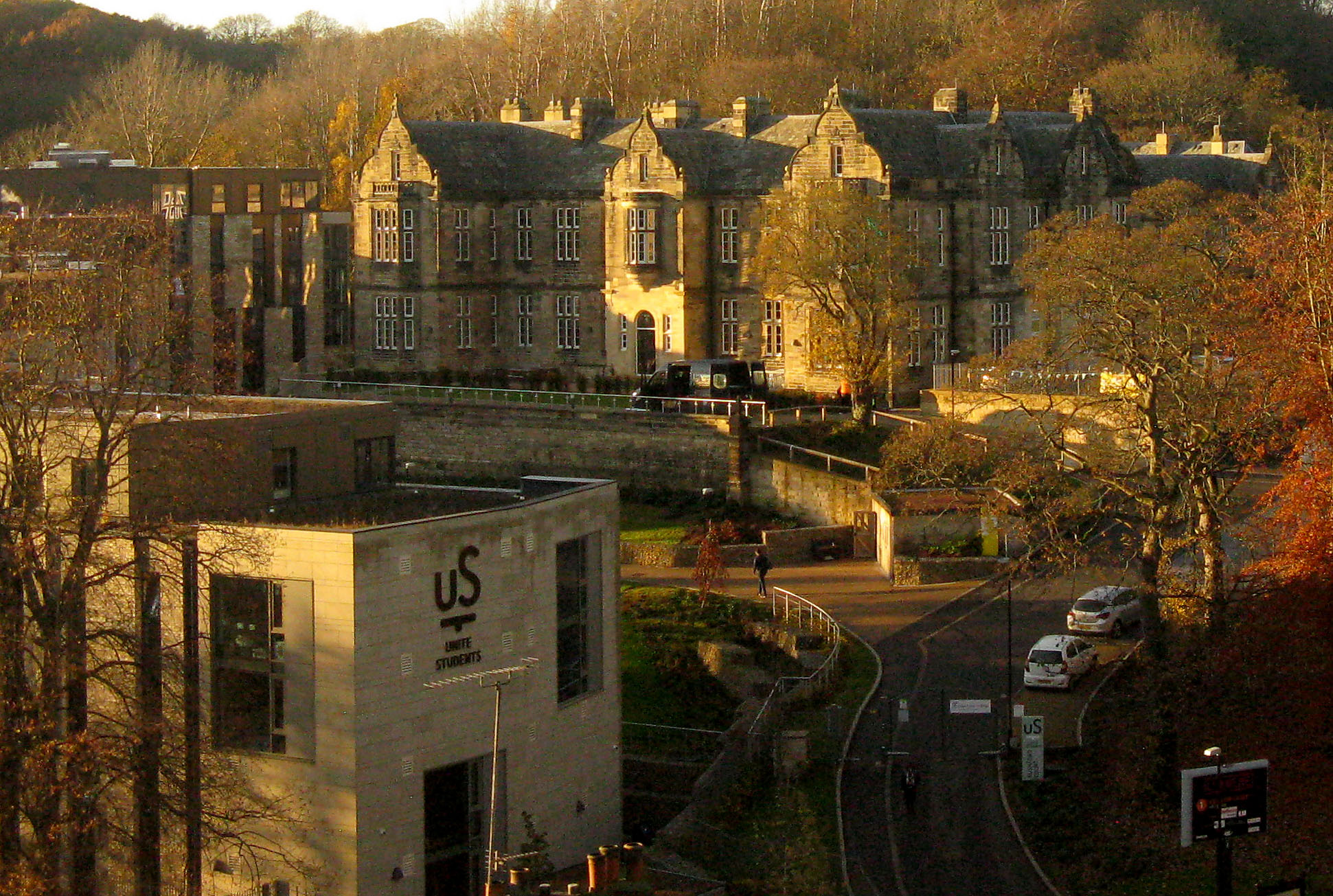
- Rushford Court in 2019

- Location within County Durham
- Former names: County Hospital, Durham

General information
- Type: Student residence; formerly hospital (closed 2010)
- Location: Durham, UK
- Coordinates: 54.77859°N 1.58472°W
- Named for: Hannah Rushford, Mayor of Durham
- Completed: 1853
- Renovated: 2018
- Owner: Unite Students

Other information
- Number of rooms: 363

Website
- https://www.unitestudents.com/durham/rushford-court

Rushford Court is a student residence and former hospital in Durham, England. It opened in 1853 as County Hospital, and closed as a hospital in 2010 after services were moved to Lanchester Road Hospital on the outskirts of the city.

In 2018, after extensive work to demolish later additions to the hospital building and construct new accommodation blocks, Unite Students reopened the site as a privately operated hall for Durham University students under the name Rushford Court.

In 2019–20, Durham University used the site as a temporary home for its John Snow College, between the college's move from Queen's Campus in Thornaby-on-Tees and the completion of its new buildings at Mount Oswald. In the 2024–25 academic year, the site is housing the College of St Hild and St Bede while the college's historic site on Leazes Road, Gilesgate is redeveloped, with work taking place to provide a new college hub building at Rushford Court. After the College of St Hild and St Bede returns to its permanent site, the university plans to found a new college on the Rushford Court site.

== History ==
=== As a hospital ===
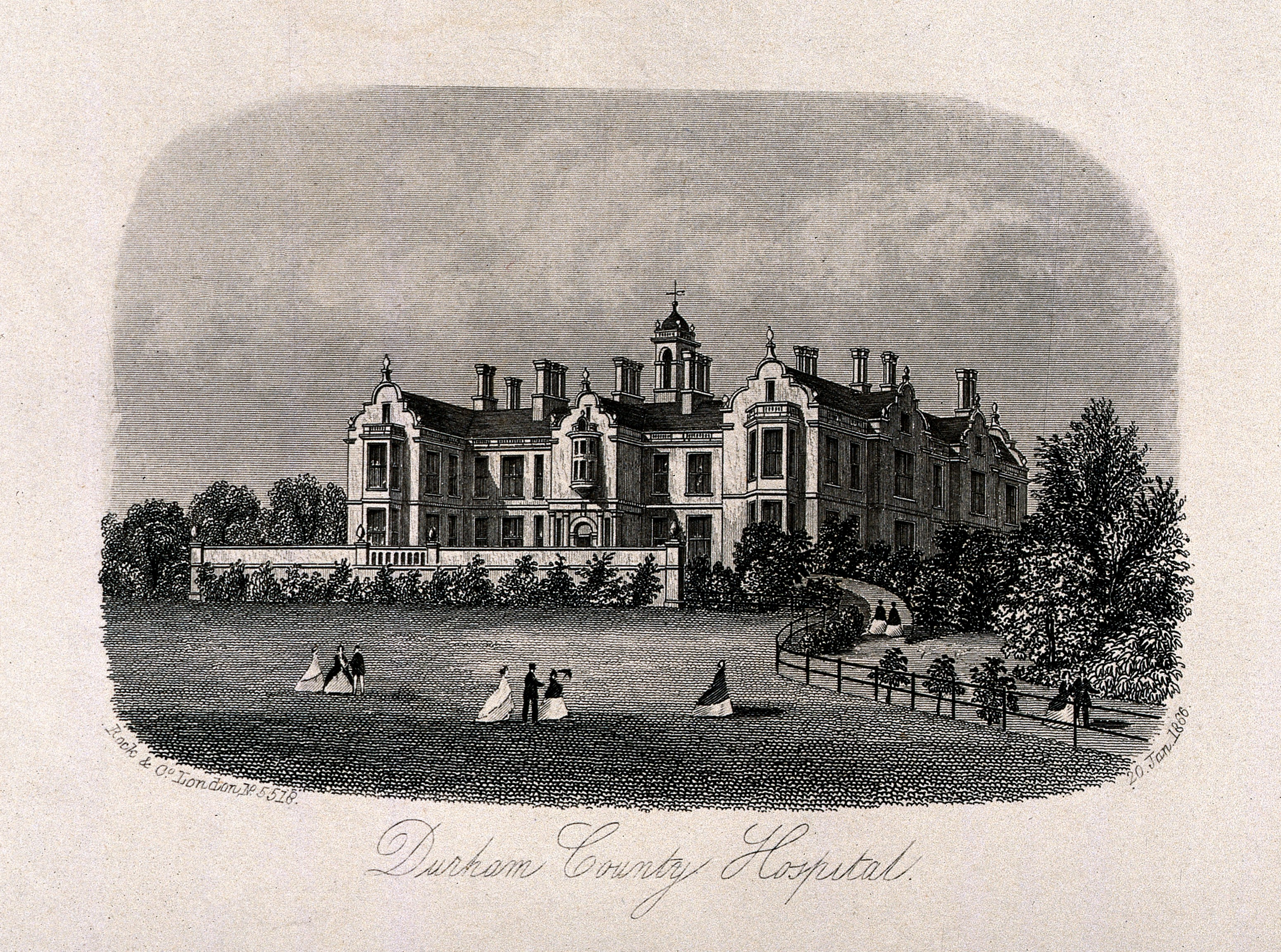
An engraving of the hospital in 1866

The hospital, which was designed in the Elizabethan style and built at a cost of £7,500, opened in 1853, replacing a hospital on Allergate. The building was on an 'H' plan, with decorated gables, chimneys and a central bell tower, and was set in an open field with a terrace to the front. A convalescent wing financed by donations from Dean Waddington, and additional wards financed by John Eden, opened in 1867 and 1886 respectively.

A freestanding building was added to the south of the hospital in 1914 to provide nursing accommodation, and an operating theatre on the east in 1919. A major proposal to expand the hospital from 50 to 204 bed was made around 1920, but not implemented. In 1938, a substantial extension called the Rushford Wing, designed by Cordingly and McIntyre, was added to the front of the building, hiding much of the original frontage. The wing was named after Hannah Rushford, who would later be the city's first female mayor.

The hospital joined the National Health Service in 1948. In 1971, a major reorganisation of Durham's hospitals made Dryburn Hospital the city's main hospital, while County Hospital became a dedicated psychiatric facility.

After psychiatric services had transferred to the Lanchester Road Hospital, the hospital closed in 2010.

=== As a student residence ===
In 2014 planning permission was sought to remove the 1930s additions, returning the main building back to its original state and adapting it to house 82 student studio flats, and to create additional new-build blocks to house another 281 student flats. Planning was refused by Durham County Council, due to the effect of the new buildings on the city's conservation area and on local residents, but this decision was overturned and planning granted by the Planning Inspectorate in March 2016.

Construction work began on the new scheme in May 2017 and was completed in August 2018. The 363-bedroom complex was sold prior to completion to Unite Students, who operate it as Rushford Court.

=== Use by Durham University ===
During 2019–20, the site was used by Durham University to house John Snow College following the college's move from Queen's Campus in Thornaby-on-Tees, while the college awaited completion of its new buildings on the Mount Oswald site.

In January 2023, Durham University announced plans to work with the owners to provide the full facilities of a Durham University college on the site, accompanied by a planning proposal to construct an additional amenities building, set into existing terracing in front of the main historic building, which was approved in April 2023. The site will provide a temporary home for Hild Bede College from summer 2024, while that college's site at Leazes Road, Gilesgate, undergoes redevelopment. After the college returns to its permanent site, the university expects to found a new college on the Rushford Court site.

== See also ==
- List of hospitals in England
