= John Snow College, Durham =

Constituent college of Durham University

John Snow College
- Durham University
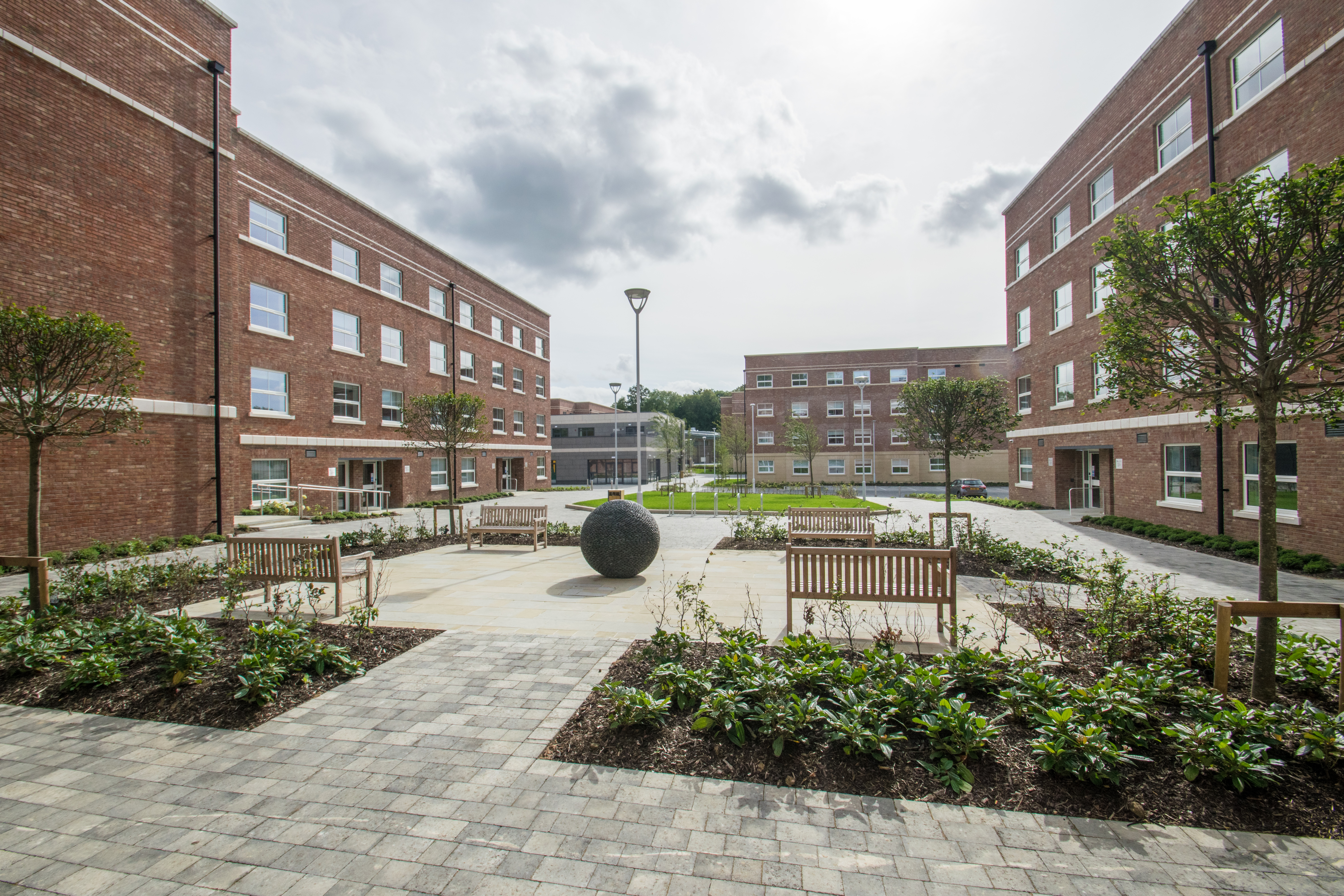
- College buildings at Mount Oswald

- Arms of John Snow College; Arms: Argent a Cross formy quadrate azure, a chief azure thereon a Yorkshire rose argent between two lions rampant Or
- Coordinates: 54.762723°N 1.585162°W
- Motto: Latin: Per scientiam et prudentiam quaere summam
- Motto in English: To seek the highest through knowledge and wisdom
- Established: 2001
- Named for: John Snow
- Principal: Prof. Nathan Sempala-Ntege OBE
- Vice principal: Dr Ruth Wilson
- Undergraduates: 913
- Postgraduates: 23
- Major events: Snow Day; Graduation Ball
- Website: John Snow College; John Snow JCR; John Snow Boat Club

Map
- Location within Durham, England

John Snow College is a constituent college of Durham University. The college was founded in 2001 on the university's Queen's Campus in Stockton-on-Tees, before moving to Durham in 2018. The college takes its name from the nineteenth-century Yorkshire physician John Snow, one of the founders of modern epidemiology.

The college is a fully self-catered college of the university, and is relatively new in comparison to other existing Durham undergraduate colleges. Rooms in the college can be found in a mixture of flats and townhouses, with all rooms in flats being ensuite. The college also has extensive leisure facilities including a large dining and entertainment hall, a gym, a yoga and dance studio, a performance practice studio, and music rooms. It is now located on the Mount Oswald site, which opened in 2020.

== History ==
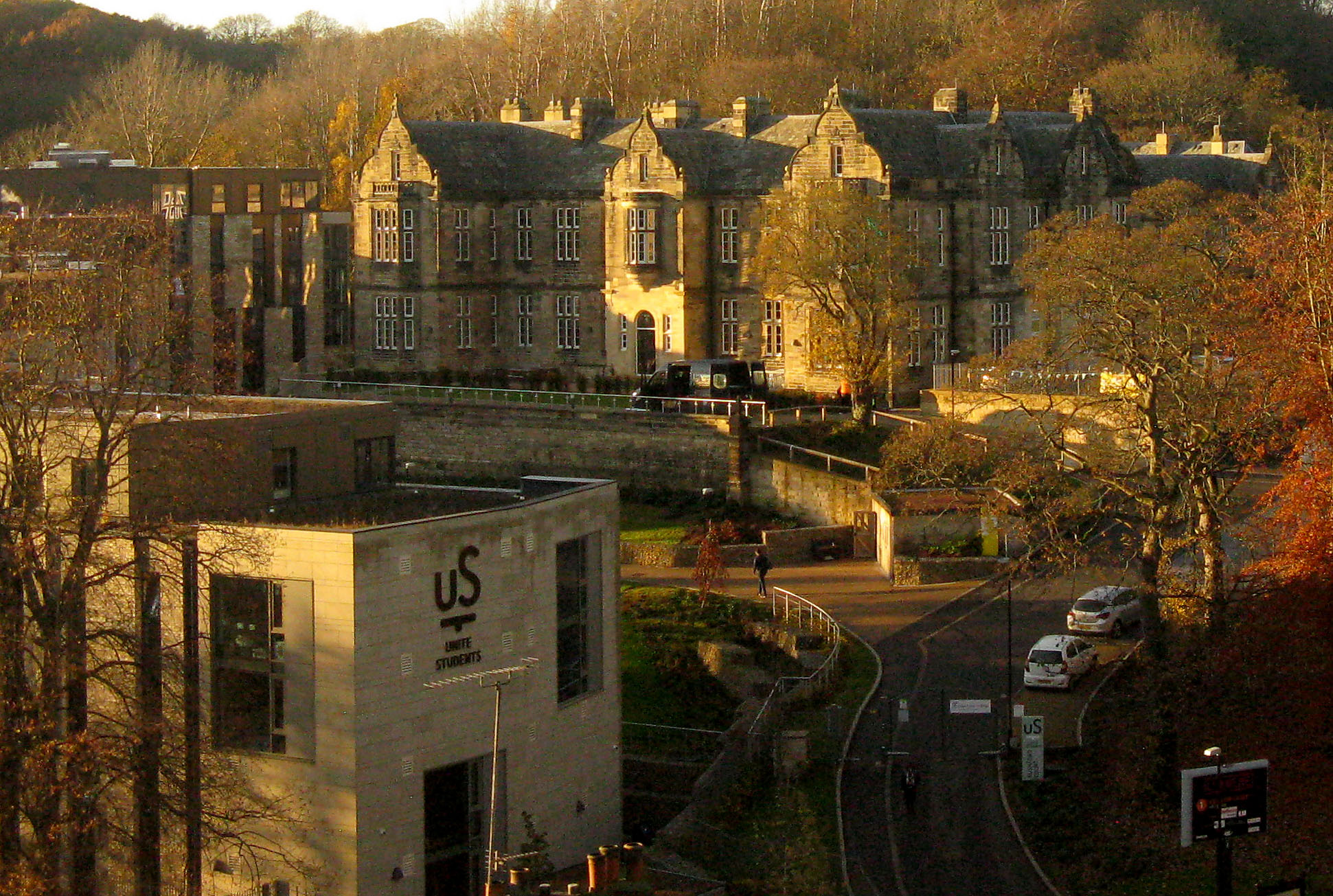
The college's 2019–20 home, Rushford Court

John Snow College has its origin in 1992, when the Joint University College on Teesside of the Universities of Durham and Teesside (JUCOT) was established as a joint venture between the University of Durham and the University of Teesside. Durham University would take full control of the university college in 1994, and it would be renamed to University of Durham, Stockton Campus (UDSC). John Snow College was then formed in 2001, when the UDSC was split into John Snow College and Stephenson College. At that time, the campus was renamed the University of Durham, Queen's Campus (UDQC), in honour of the Golden Jubilee of Elizabeth II.

In 2018, John Snow College moved temporarily to the Howlands Farm site in Durham City, adjacent to Josephine Butler, Durham and Stephenson College, Durham. For the 2019-20 year, the college moved to Rushford Court in the centre of Durham, a privately operated hall on the site of the former County Hospital.

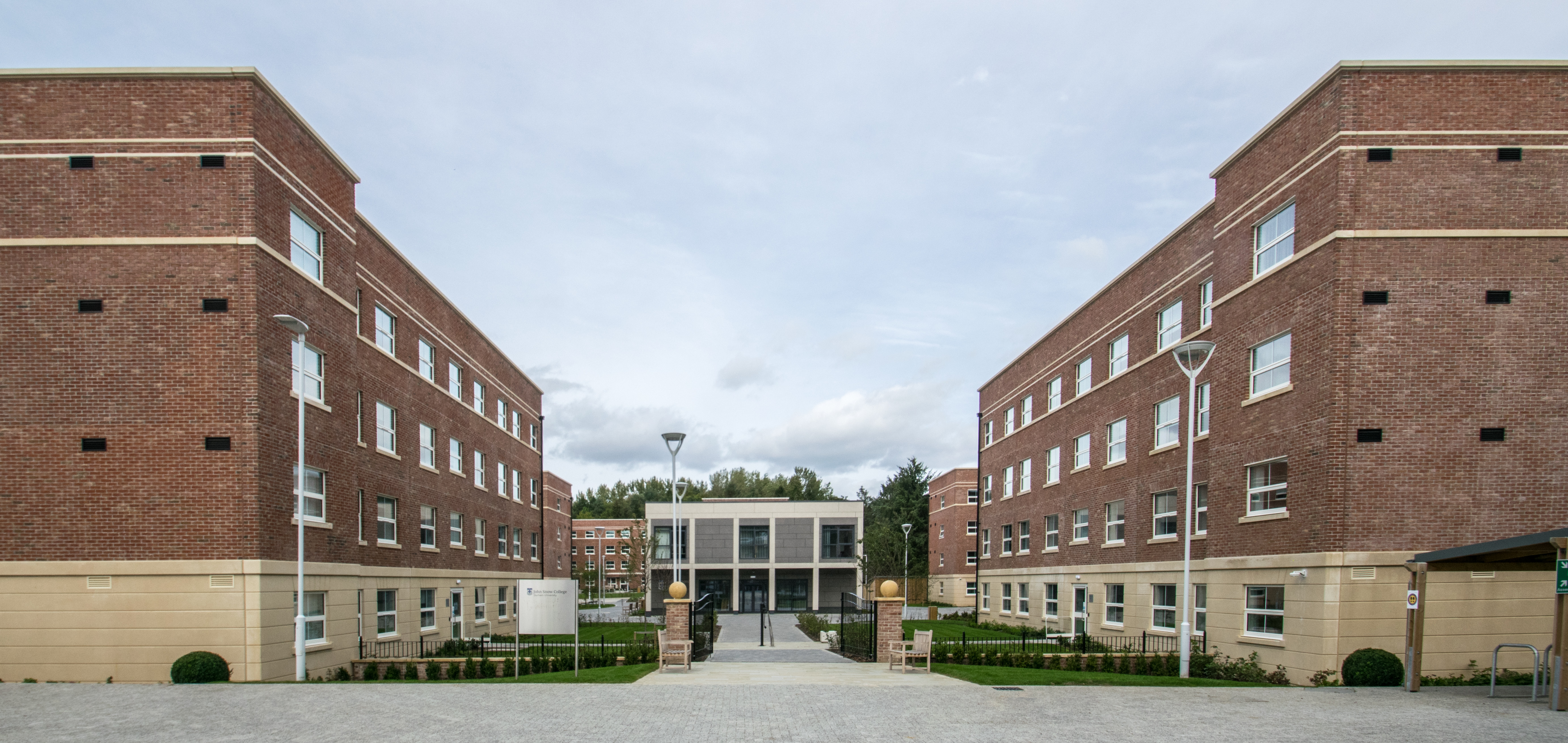
College entrance and central building

In 2020, the college moved to its permanent home in new purpose-built buildings at Mount Oswald, between South College, Durham and Durham University Business School. The site has seven blocks named after the roads surrounding the Broad Street pump from which John Snow removed the handle during the 1854 Broad Street cholera outbreak: Wardour, Bridle, Carnaby, Marshall, Lexington, Hopkins and Broadwick. Broadwick blocks are built like townhouses, with shared bathrooms, and are located at the back of the college. The rest of the blocks offer ensuite bathrooms and are divided into cluster flats housing 6-8 people. By the main gates of the college, in between Bridle and Wardour, resides a replica of the water pump Snow removed the handle from.

=== Shield and motto ===
The college arms are blazoned as "Argent a Cross formy quadrate azure, a chief azure thereon a Yorkshire rose argent between two lions rampant Or".

The college's motto is "Per scientiam et prudentiam quaere summam", which can be translated to "to seek the highest through knowledge and wisdom".

== Facilities ==
=== Main Building ===
The Main building is home to the Junior Common Room (JCR) and Middle Common Room (MCR). It is also the location of the Stockton Room, the Bateman Room, the Sackville Room and college's bar, Igloo Bar and Café.

=== The Hub Building ===
The Hub building contains a large dining/entertainment hall, a gym, a yoga/dance studio, a performance practice studio, a faith/quiet room, the John Snow Music Room, and a shared Music Room. The college also possesses an outdoor multi-use games area, often utilised for sports.

=== Accommodation Blocks ===
The accommodation blocks at John Snow College contain a total of 492 student bedrooms and 4 self contained flats for staff or visiting fellows. Rooms in the college are divided into Flats and Townhouses. First-year undergraduate students are accommodated either in an ensuite Flat or a Townhouse room. Around 40 postgraduate Masters' students are provided with accommodation in college Townhouses. Around 40 second-, third-, and final-year undergraduate students (or "returners") are accommodated in the college each year within two college Townhouses and two larger Flats.

== Student life ==
In contrast with the other constituent colleges of Durham University, both undergraduate and postgraduate students at John Snow College are members of the college's Junior Common Room (JCR). Consequently, there is no Middle Common Room (MCR), and the JCR instead has a Postgraduate Representative role as part of their executive committee. The JCR governs sports teams, student societies and arts groups, and organised other academic and recreational activities.

=== Societies ===
While university-wide student associations and societies are associated with the Durham Students' Union, the JCR governs the many student societies of the college. For example, Music Society, The Snow Globe Theatre Company, Baking Society, LGBTQ+ Society, Art Society, FemSoc, Plant Society, Bean Society, Vegetarian and Vegan Society, Book Club, Dance Society, Christian Union, Cooking Society, British Sign Language Society, RUnning Club, Fitness & Wellness, BAME Society, Hiking Society.

=== Traditions ===
John Snow holds termly formal dinners, in which members of the college attend in their relevant academic dress of Durham University. A set of rules governing behaviour at formals is outlined by the college, and disciplined by the JCR Chairman. Two college Balls are held per annum, one in the Michaelmas Term and a further Graduation Ball in the Easter Term, with a large portion of the college in attendance.

==== Snow Day ====
The annual Snow Day is a celebration of college life. The event is held within college accommodation and features entertainment, music and food. The day begins with a water fight in the spirit of Snow's medical research into the causes of the Broad Street cholera outbreak, which was ultimately traced to the water supply, with the first water fight occurring on the first Snow Day on 27 May 2002.

==== Matriculation ====
John Snow College is the only college in Durham to have the position of 'College Bugler'. Each year the college bugler processes the new intake of students through the city of Durham and announces their arrival at the cathedral, ready for Matriculation. The bugler also attends all formal events and announces the high table at the beginning of each formal.

It is tradition for all new members of the college to be matriculated by walking up the main path from the JCR building towards the gates, where they are led by a student dressed as John Snow, then walking under a John Snow banner which formally welcomes them into the college.

=== Sports ===
John Snow College fields teams in 16 sports: Men's Football, Women's Football, Men's Rugby, Women's Rugby, Basketball, Rowing, Lacrosse, Hockey, Netball, Rounders, Tennis, Badminton, Cricket, Futsal, Squash, Volleyball, Ultimate Frisbee, and Cheer.

John Snow College Boat Club (JSBC) is the rowing club of the college, which developed out of the University of Durham Stockton Campus Boat Club (UDSCBC). JSBC is a registered Boat Club through British Rowing, with Boat Code "JSC" and is a member organisation of Durham College Rowing.

John Snow Rugby Club (JSRFC) was founded in 2001. The club won the university floodlit cup in 2013. JSRFC stopped competing in rugby from 2017 to 2019, but reformed in the 2019/2020 season, and earned promotion in 2021/22.

== Notable people ==
=== Principals ===
The head of college is titled the Principal. Nathan Sempala-Ntege is the current Principal of John Snow College.

- H.M. Evans (2002–2008)
- Carolyn Summerbell (2008–2023)
- Nathan Sempala-Ntege (2023–present)

=== Sports ===
- Justin Bishop, English cricketer
- Lee Daggett, former English cricketer
