= Mount Oswald =

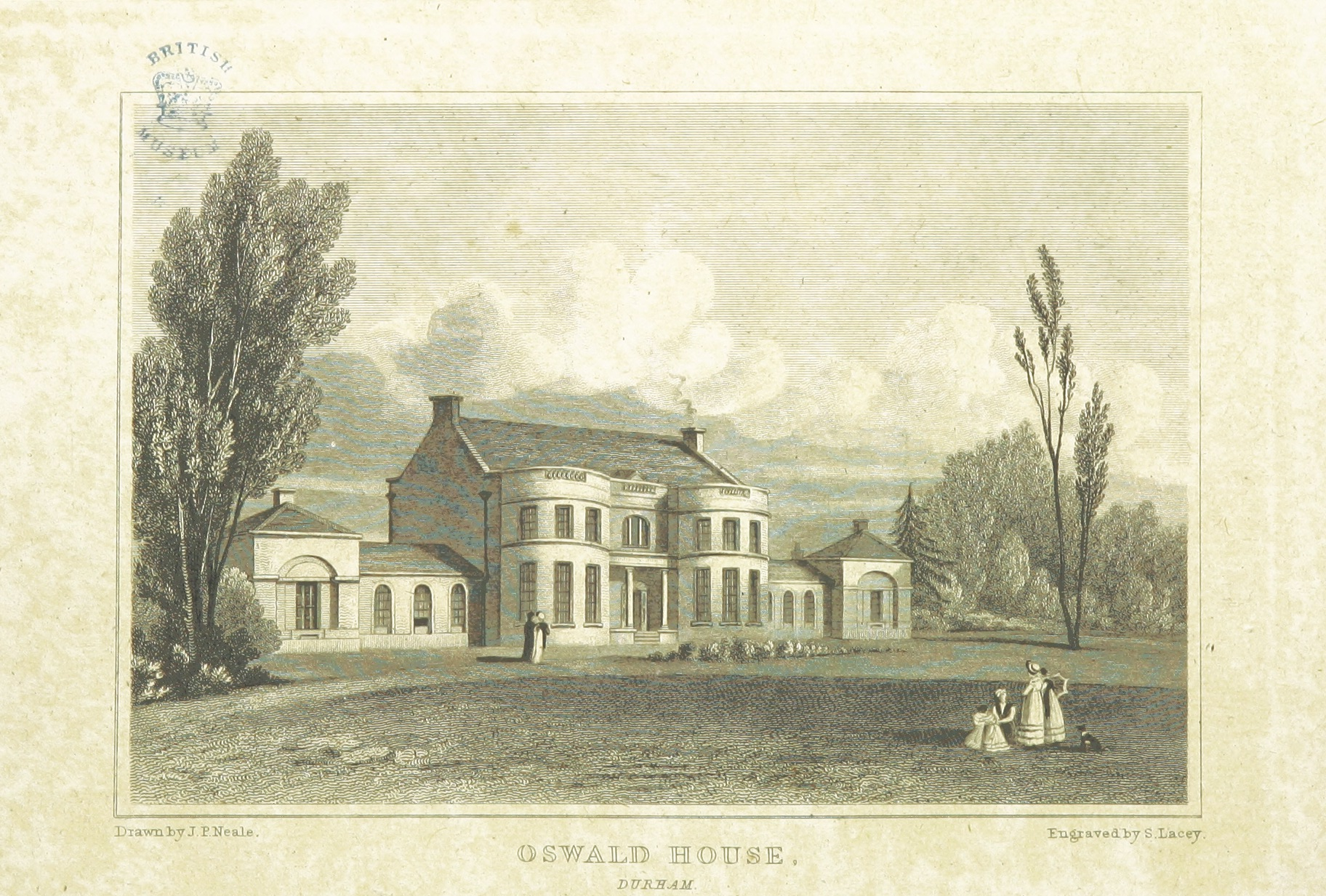
- Mount Oswald in 1818

- Location within County Durham
- 54.7602°N 1.5860°W
- Location: Durham

History
- Built: 1800

Site notes
- Architect: Phillip Wyatt
- Architectural style: Georgian
- Website: thestorydurham.org

Listed Building – Grade II
- Designated: 29 November 1973
- Reference no.: 1310089

Mount Oswald is a manor house in Durham, County Durham, England. The house, which is now Durham County Council's The Story museum, is a Grade II listed building. The surviving parkland associated with the house is including in Durham County Council's Local List of Historic Parks, Gardens and Designed Landscapes.

== History ==
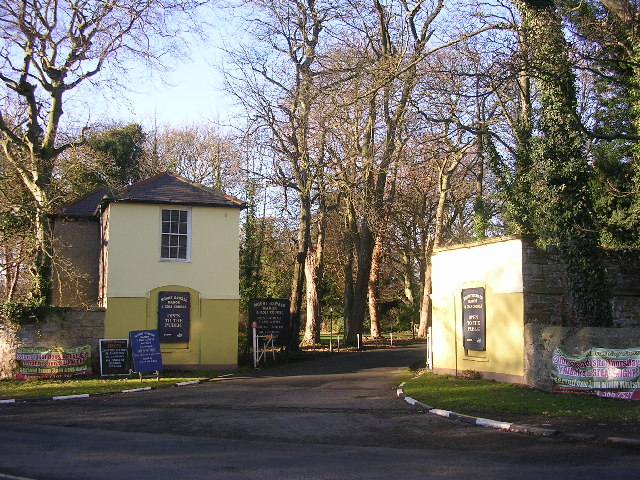
Entrance to the Mount Oswald estate

The manor house was built for John Richardby, a London merchant, in 1800. It was bought by Thomas Wilkinson (1752-1825), a former mayor of Durham, in 1806 and it then passed to the Rev Percival Spearman Wilkinson (1792-1875), in 1828. The Rev Percival Spearman Wilkinson commissioned Phillip Wyatt to expand the house in the Georgian style in 1830.

Mount Oswald then passed to the Rev Percival Spearman Wilkinson's son, Percival Spearman Wilkinson JP (1820-1898), before being acquired by the North Brancepeth Colliery Company in the 1890s. The house was acquired by North of England Estates (a business owned by the McKeag family) in 1934: North of England Estates operated the Mount Oswald estate as the Durham City Golf Club until 1967, when the golf club moved to Littleburn, and then operated it as a commercial golf course. The property was then acquired by the property developers, Banks Group, for residential development in January 2014.

In August 2014 Banks Group sold part of the site to Durham University who had ambitions to use it for accommodation for 1,000 students. The project was procured by Durham University under a private finance initiative contract in August 2018. The construction works, which were undertaken by Interserve at a cost of £105 million, saw John Snow College (relocated from Rushford Court) and South College (a completely new college) created on the Mount Oswald site in September 2020.

In June 2019 Durham County Council revealed plans to move the county archives from County Hall to a new history centre, which was also intended to accommodate the Durham Light Infantry Collection, in the manor house at Mount Oswald. The project, which envisaged Banks Group transferring the manor house to the council for a nominal sum, was granted planning consent in September 2020. In March 2020 Banks Group also applied for planning permission to convert the gatehouses into residential properties.

The Story museum opened to the public in June 2024, incorporating the County Durham Archives, the Historical Environment Record for the county, the Durham Light Infantry collection, the Local Studies collection and the Historic Registration collection. It won the national Excellence in Heritage and Culture Award from the Royal Town Planning Institute in 2025.

== See also ==
- The Light, Durham
