= Stephenson College, Durham =

Constituent college of Durham University

Stephenson College
- Durham University
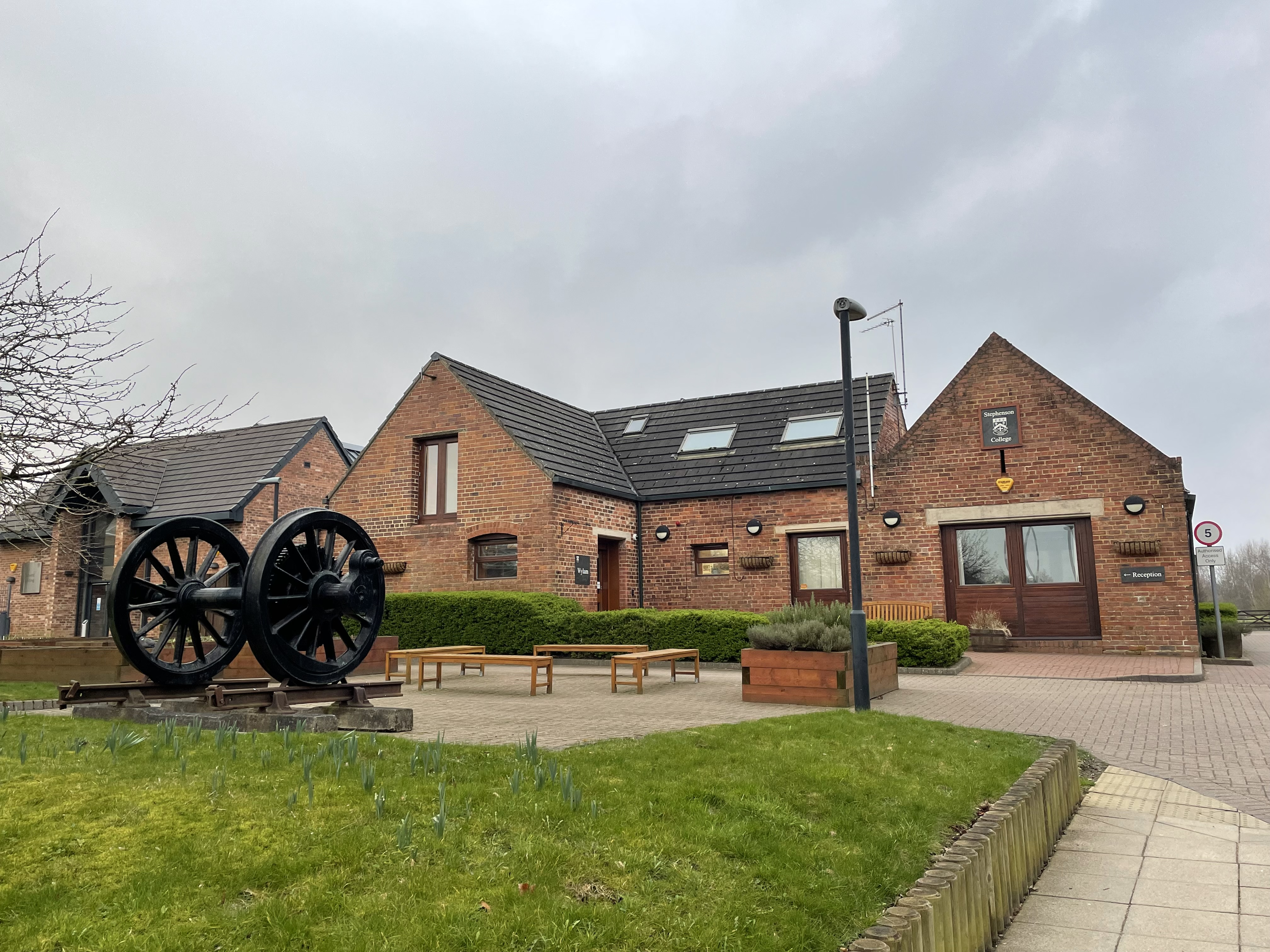
- Main building of Stephenson College

- Arms of Stephenson College; Arms: Argent a chevron between two fleurs-de-lis in chief and a cross fleurettée in gules a chief gules theoreon three lions rampant argent
- Coordinates: 54.759410°N 1.581444°W
- Motto: Latin: Me quondam mirabitur orbis
- Motto in English: One day I shall astonish the world
- Established: 2001
- Named for: George Stephenson
- Colours
- Principal: Katie Stobbs
- Undergraduates: 1200
- Postgraduates: 120
- Website: Stephenson College; JCR Website

Map
- Location within Durham, England

Stephenson College (formally George Stephenson College, known colloquially as Stevo) is a constituent college of Durham University in Durham, England.

It was founded in 2001 as part the university's Queen's Campus in Thornaby-on-Tees. During 2017 to 2019, it relocated to the city of Durham, joining Josephine Butler College at the Howlands Farm site on Elvet Hill. It is named after George Stephenson, the 19th-century railway engineer and pioneer.

== History ==
=== In Thornaby (1992-2019) ===
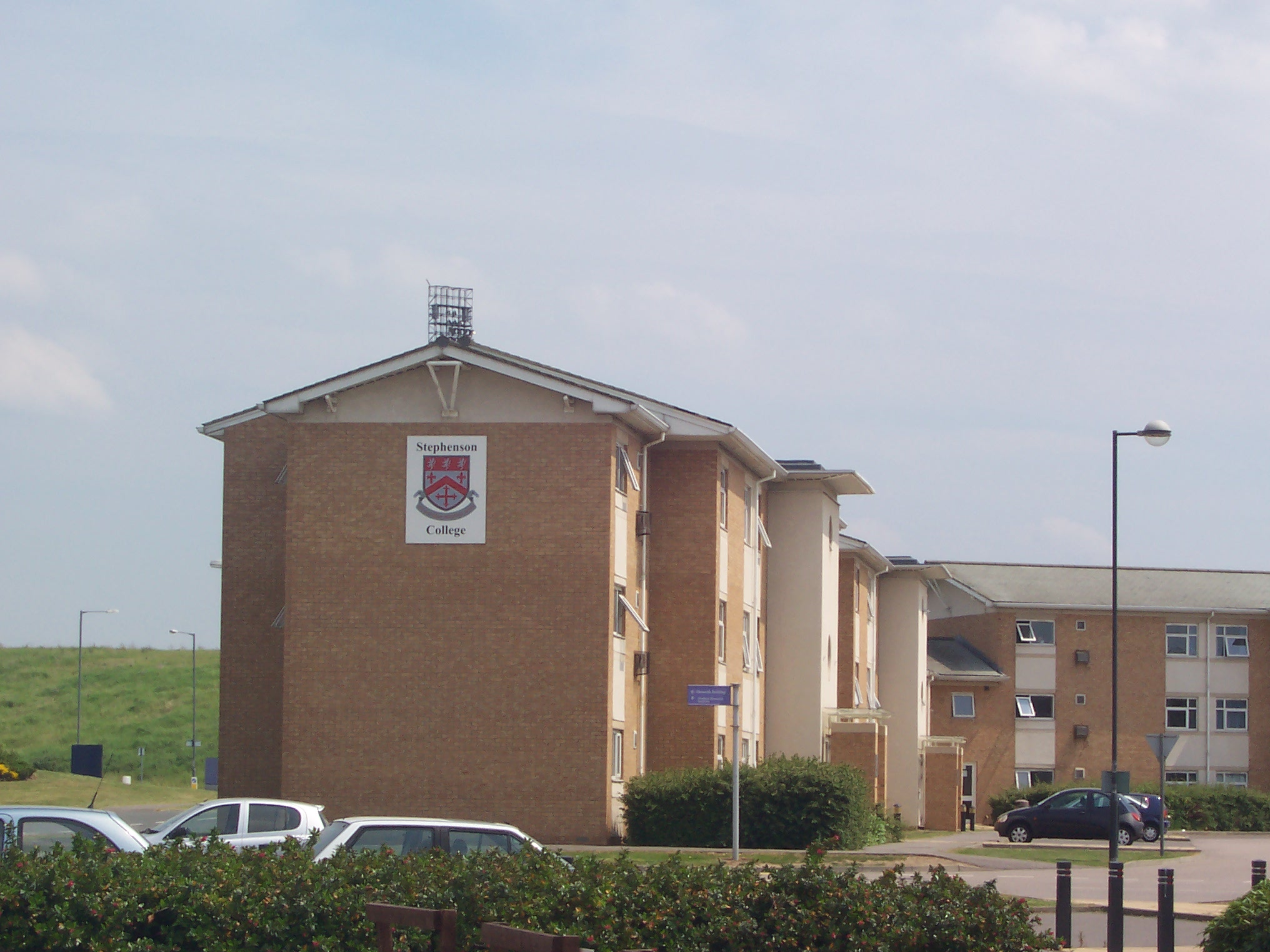
The college's former home in Thornaby

In 1992, University College, Stockton (UCS) was established on a new site in Thornaby-on-Tees, in the borough of Stockton-on-Tees, as a joint venture between the University of Durham and the University of Teesside. This was initially a joint venture, granting joint degrees validated by both institutions (BAs and BScs). However, Teesside, which had only become a university in 1992, had difficulties in taking on its responsibilities for the college and Durham took full control in 1998.

A programme of integration with Durham began, leading to the college becoming a college of the University of Durham in 1994 — the only college with teaching responsibilities. Further integration led to the campus being renamed the University of Durham, Stockton Campus (UDSC) in 1998, with teaching responsibilities being separated from the college structure. In 2001 UDSC was split into two colleges: George Stephenson College and John Snow College.

In 2006 the college name was changed to Stephenson College.

2010 saw the opening of Stephenson Central, in the middle of the college, housing a library, games, meeting and TV room with a bar at the centre, as well as the Junior Common Room office.

=== In Durham (2017-present) ===
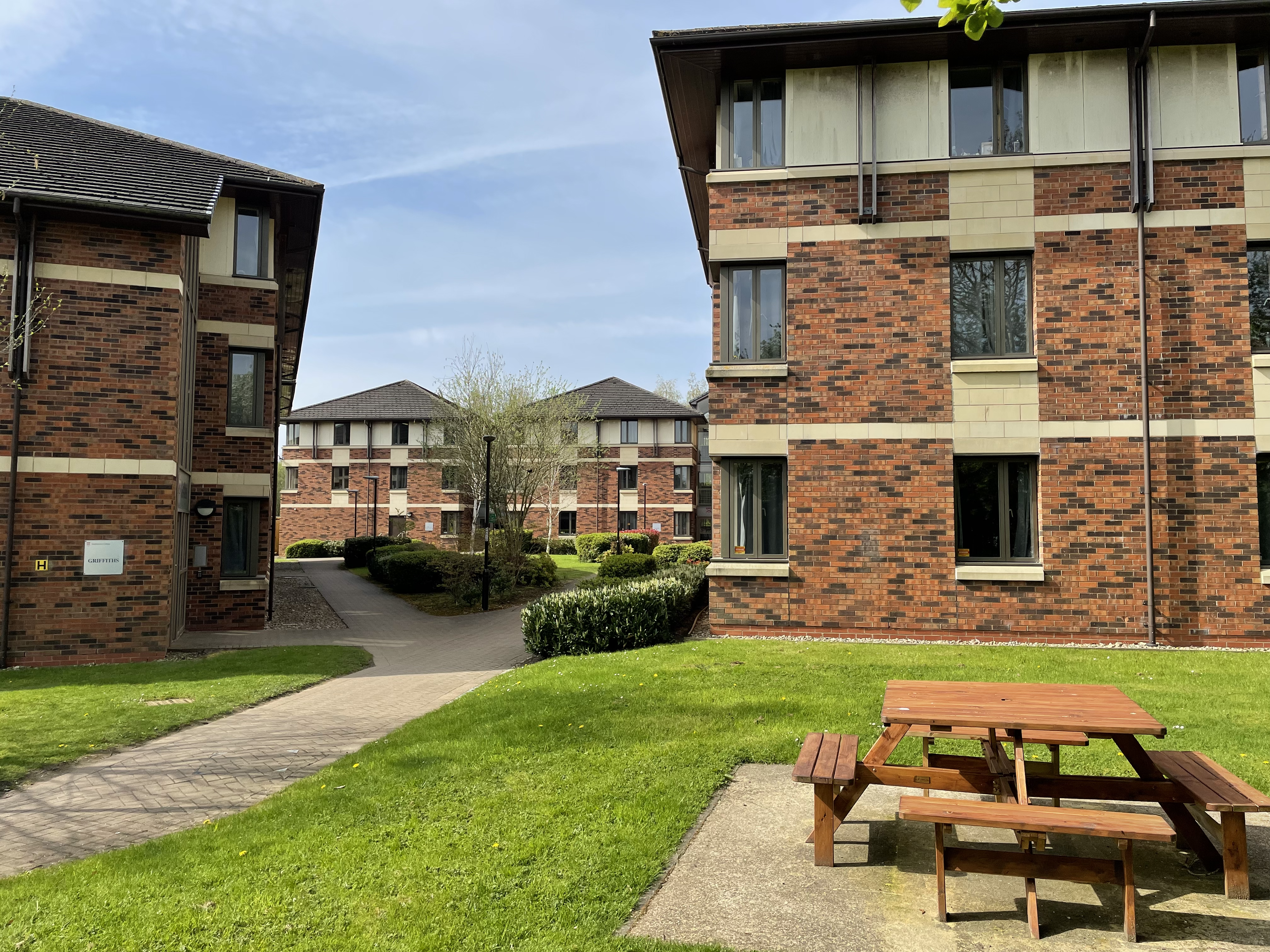
College accommodation blocks at Howlands Farm

Stephenson College and the other Queen's Campus college, John Snow College, relocated to Durham on a phased basis starting in October 2017, completing in 2019. Stephenson College took over buildings formerly occupied by Ustinov College on the Howlands Farm site, adjacent to Josephine Butler College. The college is a 15 minute walk from the Mountjoy site which contains many departments and large lecture theatres.

== Facilities ==
=== Accommodation ===
Stephenson is a self-catered college, with rooms arranged in flats with shared kitchens. All rooms are single-occupancy, and include en-suite rooms as well as those with shared bathrooms.

As of 2023, the college has 1304 members, with 433 living in college accommodation.

=== Communal facilities ===
Communal facilities in the college include "Platform 1", the college's café and bar; "Platform 2", a performance venue and social space with two dart boards and a pool table;"Platform 3", a study space and library; a shop, two gyms, further study spaces and a music room. The college also shares use of a multi-use space, Howlands Hall, with Josephine Butler College, which is used for sporting activities as well as formal meals.

=== Dining ===
Stephenson is a self-catered college and has no dining hall. However, optional formal and informal communal meals are held, with around six of each during the year.

=== Sports and Societies ===
The undergraduate student body (Junior Common Room or JCR) is governed by an elected Executive Committee headed by the President and supported by several other officers. Regular JCR meetings are held to discuss and vote on important issues.

The JCR also supports many societies run exclusively for college students. The most popular societies include Stephenson College Boat Club (SCBC), Football, Rugby and Badminton.
