= Josephine Butler College, Durham =

Constituent college of Durham University

Josephine Butler College
- Durham University
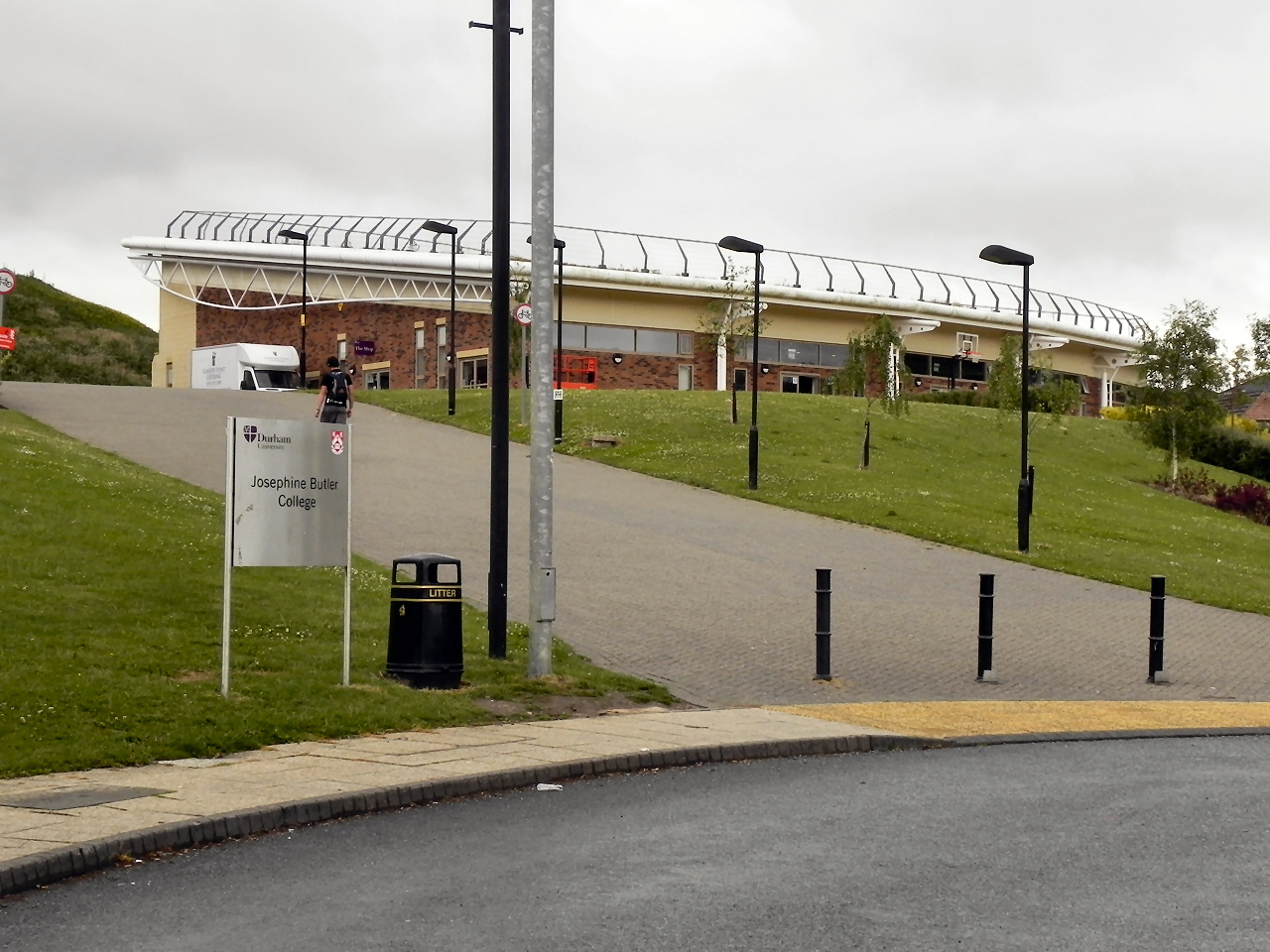
- College buildings at the Howlands Farm site

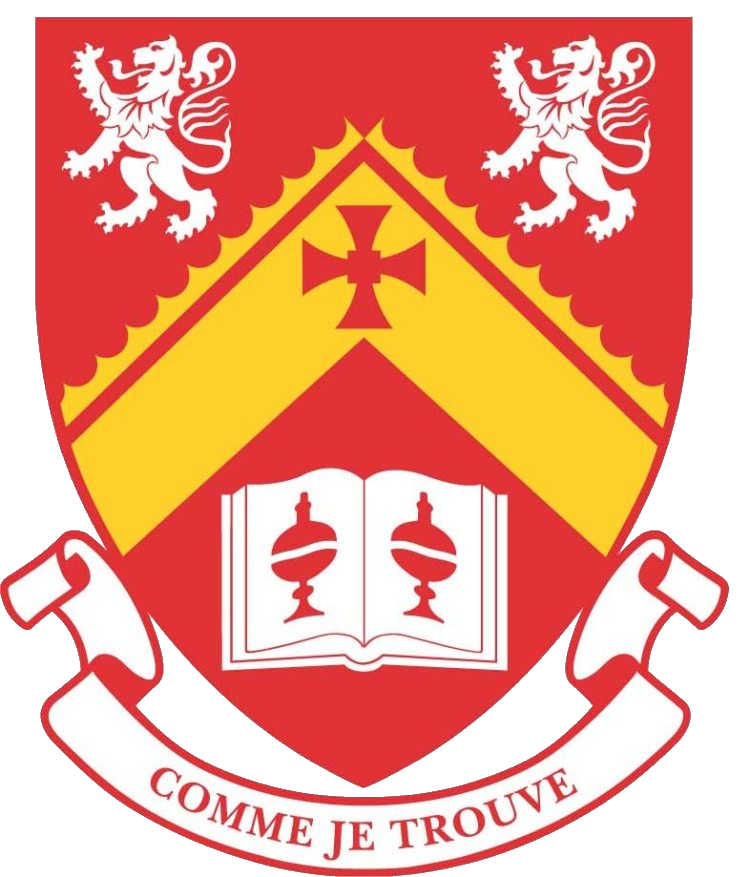
- Arms of Josephine Butler College; Arms: Gules on a chevron Or charged with a Cross formy, with cotises invected, between in chief two lions Argent and in base an open book charged with two covered cups
- Coordinates: 54.7592°N 1.5789°W
- Motto: French: Comme je trouve
- Motto in English: As I find
- Established: 2006
- Named for: Josephine Butler
- Colours
- Principal: Gillian Hampden-Thompson
- Vice principal: Harriet Tebbs
- Undergraduates: 1300
- Postgraduates: 110
- Charities: Grace House
- Major events: Butler Day; Summer Ball; Winter Ball
- Website: Josephine Butler College; JCR Website; MCR Website

Map
- Location within Durham, England

Josephine Butler College is a constituent college of Durham University. The college was opened in 2006. It is named after Josephine Elizabeth Butler, a 19th-century feminist and social reformer who had a significant role in improving women's public health and education in England. Butler's father was the cousin of the 2nd Earl Grey, after whom Grey College, Durham is named.

The college is a fully self-catered college of the university, and, unique in comparison to other Durham colleges, all rooms are en-suite. It is one of the university's first fully self-catered constituent colleges in Durham. The college also has extensive leisure facilities including a library, study spaces, sports hall, outdoor tennis court and music room. It is located within the Howlands Farm site along South Road, next to Stephenson College, Durham.

== History ==
Josephine Butler College was opened in 2006. It became the first new college at a British university in 25 years, and the first completely new college to open in Durham itself since the 1970s.

=== Shield and motto ===
The college arms are blazoned as "Gules on a chevron Or charged with a Cross formy, with cotises invected, between in chief two lions Argent and in base an open book charged with two covered cups". The arms represent in large the heritage of Josephine Butler, with the lion argent being a symbol of the Grey family. The covered cups on the pages of the books are a heraldic symbol of the Butler family.

The college's motto is "Comme je trouve", which can be translated to "As I Find," and is intended to mean "we take life as we find it and make of it the best we can".

== Facilities ==
=== Howlands Building ===
The Howlands building is shared with Josephine Butler's neighbouring college, Stephenson College. It contains the college gym, laundry and music room. A large multi-purpose hall is also contained in the building that is used to host formal dinners and sports practice sessions.

=== Butler Building ===
The Butler building acts as the main social building of the college and mainly contains the college bar (JB's) and some other rooms such as the college offices, porter's lodge and reception, in addition to the Junior Common Room (JCR), the Middle Common Room (MCR), library lounge, dance studio and study spaces.

=== Accommodation blocks and the Mound ===
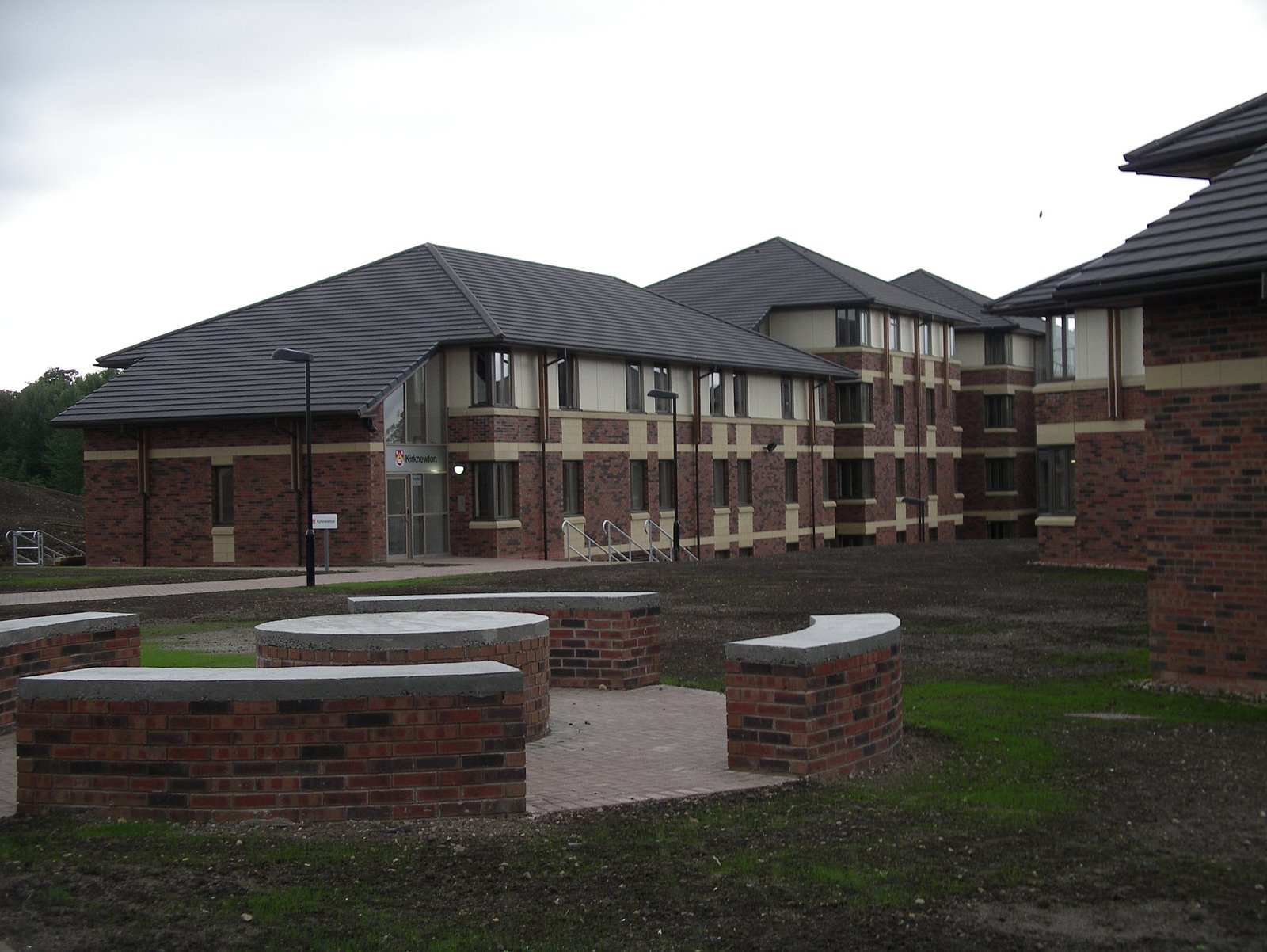
Student accommodation in the Kirknewton Building

Josephine Butler is built around a grass-covered hill called "the Mound", which stands between it and Stephenson College. The college has four separate self-contained accommodation blocks; Kirknewton, Dilston, Milfield and Wooler. Each building is divided up into 6 bed-roomed flats, with en-suite facilities. The main four accommodation blocks are all named after locations related to Josephine Butler's life: she was born in Milfield, spent a lot of her early life in Dilston, died in Wooler and is buried in Kirknewton. The buildings of Dilston, Milfield and Wooler are used to house first year undergraduate students, whilst Kirknewton is used for predominantly returners and post-graduates.

In July 2017, Josephine Butler College was ranked as the fourth-best student hall in the UK, based on an analysis of over 10,000 student and graduate reviews.

== Student life ==
Undergraduate and postgraduate students are respectively members of the college's Junior Common Room (JCR) and Middle Common Room (MCR). A committee of students elected from JCR and MCR are elected annually to organise charity fundraisers, campaigning for causes, events, and volunteering initiatives.

=== Societies ===
While university-wide student associations and societies are associated with the Durham Students' Union, the JCR governs the many student societies of the college.

The Evangeline Theatre Company, formerly known as the Suffragette Theatre Company (STC), is the drama society for Josephine Butler College. The Theatre Company accepts members from in and outside of the college, and focuses on politically and socially charged productions, such as its production of 'The Tempest' at the Gala Theatre in June 2019. The society is primarily known in college for its formal that is held in Michaelmas term every year, involving a Murder Mystery style format.

The college also has a separate musical theatre society called Mound Musical Society that they share with their neighbouring college Stephenson College. The society aims to put on one production in Epiphany term each year, previous productions include Firebringer (2023) and the 25th Annual Putnam County Spelling Bee (2024).

=== Sports ===
Josephine Butler College also has an extensive array of sports open to its students. Some of the sports available include: football, rugby, badminton, boxing, running, rowing, lacrosse, basketball, dance etc., as well as more varied activities such as cheerleading, ultimate frisbee, pool, and darts. Due to the collegiate system at Durham, there are over 700 different sports teams in the university, including Team Durham. Within Butler College itself, there are over 40 teams and 20 sports available. Most sports also have multiple teams to cater for people of differing abilities, allowing complete beginners to pick up a new sports whilst also enabling experienced athletes to strive for success.

Josephine Butler College Cricket Club (JBCCC) is the college's cricket team. As of 2018, the club consists of two outdoor sides, the A team and the Development team, and two indoor teams, an A and B team. Indoor cricket is played across the Epiphany term, and in the Easter term outdoor T20 cricket is played. The club won back to back indoor titles in 2014 and 2015. In 2018 they reached the final of the outdoor T20 competition. In the same year a 24-hour charity cricket match was held in the Howlands, which raised over £700 for the Glenn McGrath Foundation.

Butler College Boat Club (BCBC) is the boat club of Josephine Butler College at Durham University. The club is responsible for hosting its own inter-collegiate head race, Butler Head. In 2015, a BCBC VIII beat 3 other boats including the University of Leeds to get to the final of Durham Regatta. The biggest success came to the boat club in the 2016 Durham Regatta season where the 2015 BCBC VIII took the title of Durham Regatta by winning the Alderman Thurlow Trophy.

BCBC is a registered Boat Club through British Rowing, with Boat Code "BTL" and is a member organisation of Durham College Rowing.

== Notable people ==
=== Principals ===
The head of college is titled the Principal. Professor Adrian Simpson was the Principal from the college's foundation in 2006, announcing in 2022 that he was stepping down to take on the role of Principal at St Mary's College, Durham. In January 2023, it was announced that Professor Gillian Hampden-Thompson would succeed Professor Simpson as Principal of Josephine Butler College a post that she started on 1 July 2023.

=== Other Notable People ===
- Claudia MacDonald, England international rugby union player
