= Queen's Campus, Durham University =

Durham University International Study Centre
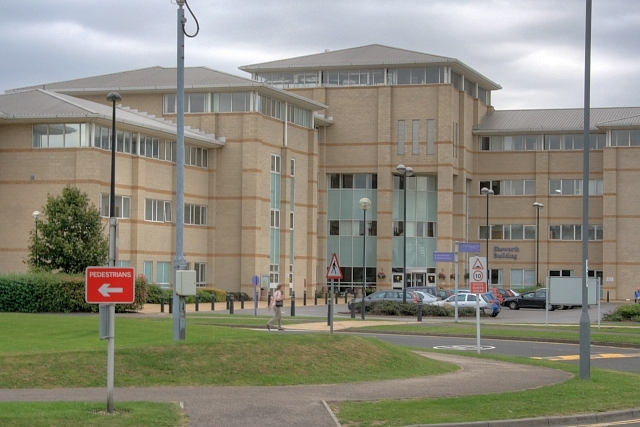
- Ebsworth Building, Queen's Campus
- Other names: Queen's Campus
- Operated by: Study Group
- Type: Foundation programme
- Established: 1992 (campus) 2017 (ISC)
- Parent institution: Durham University
- Location: Thornaby-on-Tees, Borough of Stockton-on-Tees; 54.563°N 1.297°W
- Website: www.durhamisc.com
- Location in County Durham

Queen's Campus is a site in Thornaby-on-Tees, in the borough of Stockton-on-Tees, owned by the University of Durham and now home to the Durham University International Study Centre.

It was founded in 1992 as University College, Stockton (UCS), a joint venture with the University of Teesside. Teesside withdrew from the project in 1998, and the campus was renamed University of Durham, Stockton Campus (UDSC). In 2001 it was divided into two colleges, John Snow College and Stephenson College, and in 2002 renamed Queen's Campus to celebrate the golden jubilee of Queen Elizabeth II.

In 2016, the university announced that it would be moving all colleges and departments from the campus to Durham City beginning in 2017, and repurposing the campus as a new International Study Centre to prepare overseas students to study at Durham, run by Study Group. This was completed in 2019.

== History ==
=== Background ===
The idea of Durham University establishing a presence on Teesside was first floated in 1987 and planning began in earnest in 1988 for a "Birkbeck of the North" with around 1,000 students. Teesside was, at that time, the largest conurbation in Europe without a university, and the Teesside Development Corporation had recently been established to try to regenerate the area. In April 1989 a formal announcement was made that Teesside Polytechnic and Durham University were working together "in planning a major development in Higher Education in Cleveland and its adjacent areas".

Stresses in the partnership arose in December 1989, when Durham approved plans for a new Institute of Health Studies without discussions with the Polytechnic. This led in January 1990 to a formula establishing the development as a Joint University College between Durham and Teesside rather than (as originally conceived) a Durham college with backing from Teesside. This was approved by Durham University Senate in mid February and the initiative was launched publicly three days later.

The initial bid to the funding councils (the Universities Funding Council – UFC; and the Polytechnics and Colleges Funding Council – PCFC) was for 280 students initially, rising to 840 after three years. In 1991 the UFC and PCFC agreed to fund 100 places each initially, rising to 225 each – only half of what had been hoped for. Nevertheless, plans went ahead and a site opposite Stockton-on-Tees on the south bank of the river, home to Head Wrightson engineering works until their closure in 1987, was chosen.

=== Establishment ===
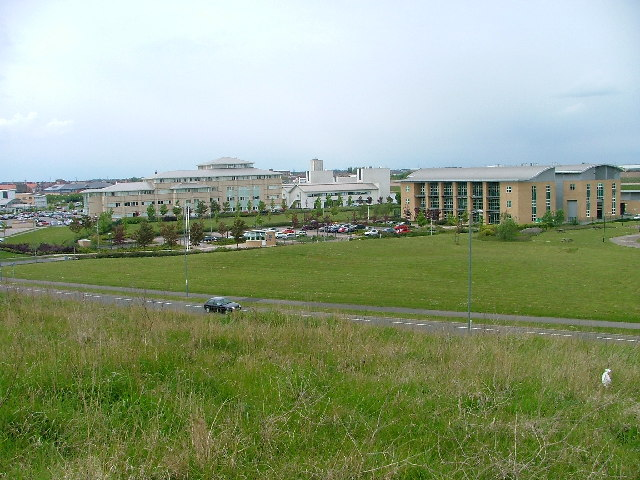
The campus in 2005, Ebsworth Building (l) and Wolfson Research Institute (c), and non-university buildings to the right

The Joint University College on Teesside (JUCOT) was formally launched on 3 September 1991 by Michael Fallon, Schools Minister and MP for Darlington.

On 1 January 1992, Robert Parfitt was appointed as the first principal of the college. Later that year Durham's statutes were modified to allow it grant joint degrees, regulations for the degrees to be awarded by JUCOT were established, and JUCOT was formally incorporated as a Limited Company established under a joint venture agreement between Durham and Teesside. The name did not, however, prove acceptable to the various government departments, nor was the alternative of Queen's College (there were too many already), but the name of University College, Stockton (UCS) was approved just before opening on 12 October 1992 with an initial enrolment of 190 students. In June of the same year, Teesside Polytechnic had become Teesside University, so the college was opened as a joint venture of the two universities.

Near the end of its first year of operation, the college was formally opened by Queen Elizabeth II on 18 May 1993. The 1993 academic year saw student numbers grow to 430 with the addition of teacher training.

=== Withdrawal of Teesside and integration into Durham ===
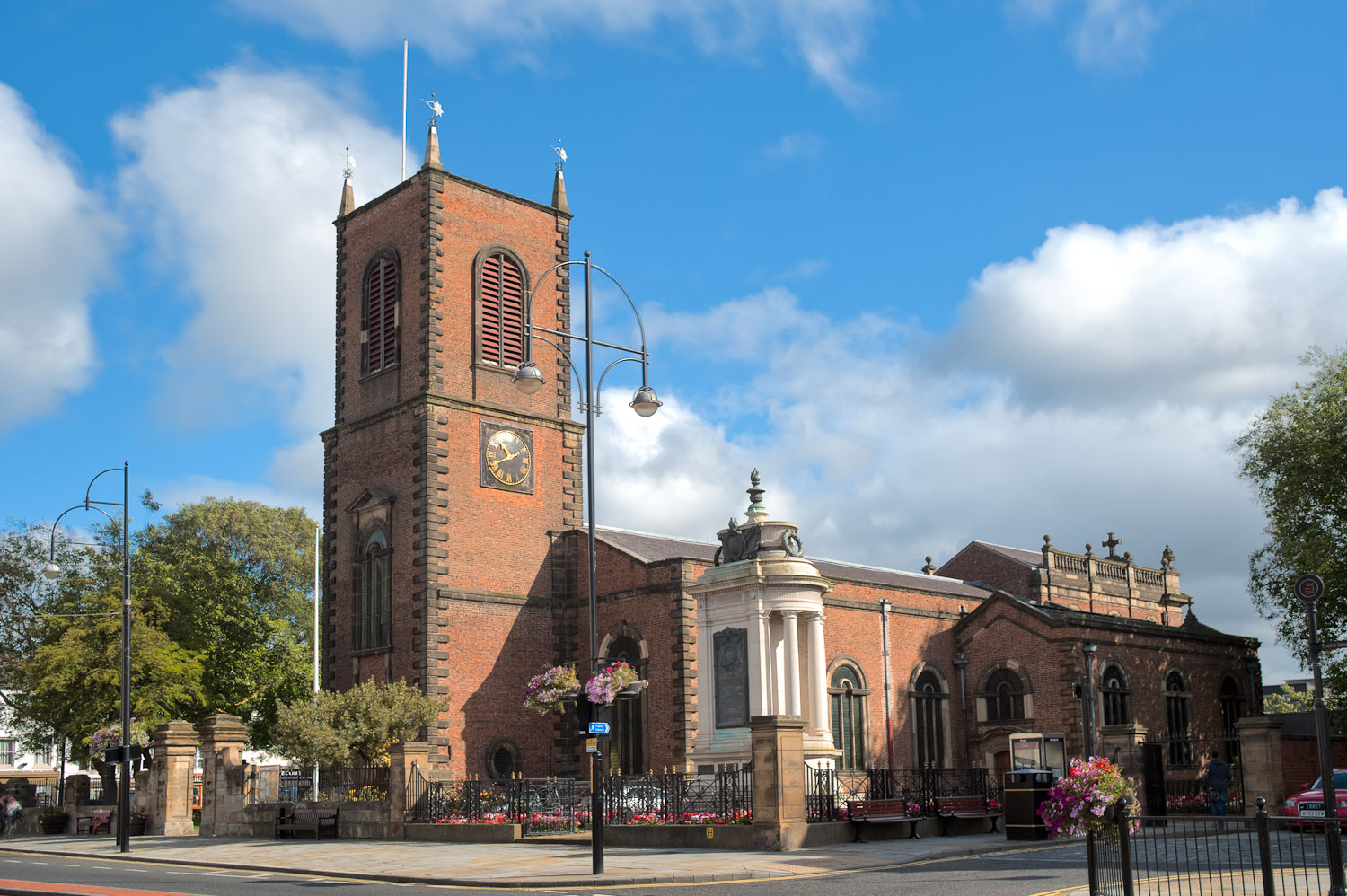
Stockton Parish Church, site of graduations from 1995 to 2001

In 1994, at the suggestion of the UCS board, Durham assumed administrative and financial responsibility for the college. At the same time, approval was given to build student residences at Stockton, and the Privy Council approved changes to Durham's statutes making UCS a residential and teaching college of the university.

Parfitt retired in April 1994 and was replaced as principal by John Hayward. Integration with Durham began, with the departments being established as Boards of Studies, and the company being wound up – its board of directors becoming (like Durham colleges) a board of governors, still including Teesside but with increased representation from Durham.

The college's first degree ceremony was held in 1995 at Stockton Parish Church, presided over by Sir Peter Ustinov as chancellor of Durham and Sir Leon Brittan as chancellor of Teesside and awarding joint degrees of the two universities.

In 1996 it was agreed that students at Stockton would take degrees of Durham from 1998, rather than joint degrees. With Durham taking on sole responsibility in 1998, the campus was renamed the University of Durham, Stockton Campus (UDSC), separating teaching responsibilities from UCS.

=== Expansion ===
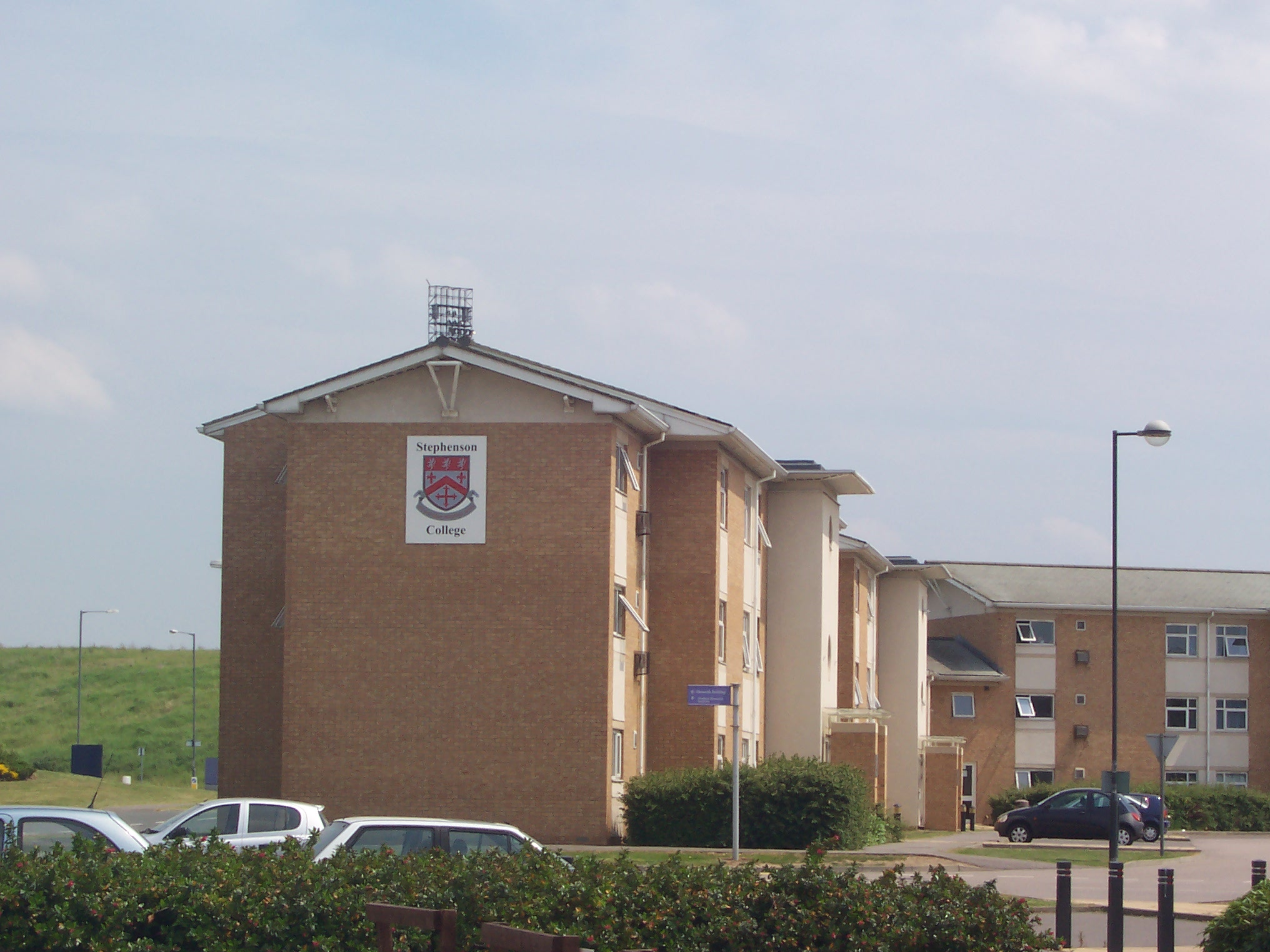
Stephenson College (now Endeavour Court) in 2006

By 2000 student numbers had reached 1,350, with plans to grow to 2,000 by 2003. It was bigger than any other Durham college, and set to keep growing. It was therefore decided to split UCS into two colleges that would be similar to the colleges in Durham City. The colleges were established as "shadow colleges" in October 2000. The two new colleges, named John Snow and Stephenson (originally George Stephenson) after the physician and the engineer, were formally established in September 2001, replacing UCS.

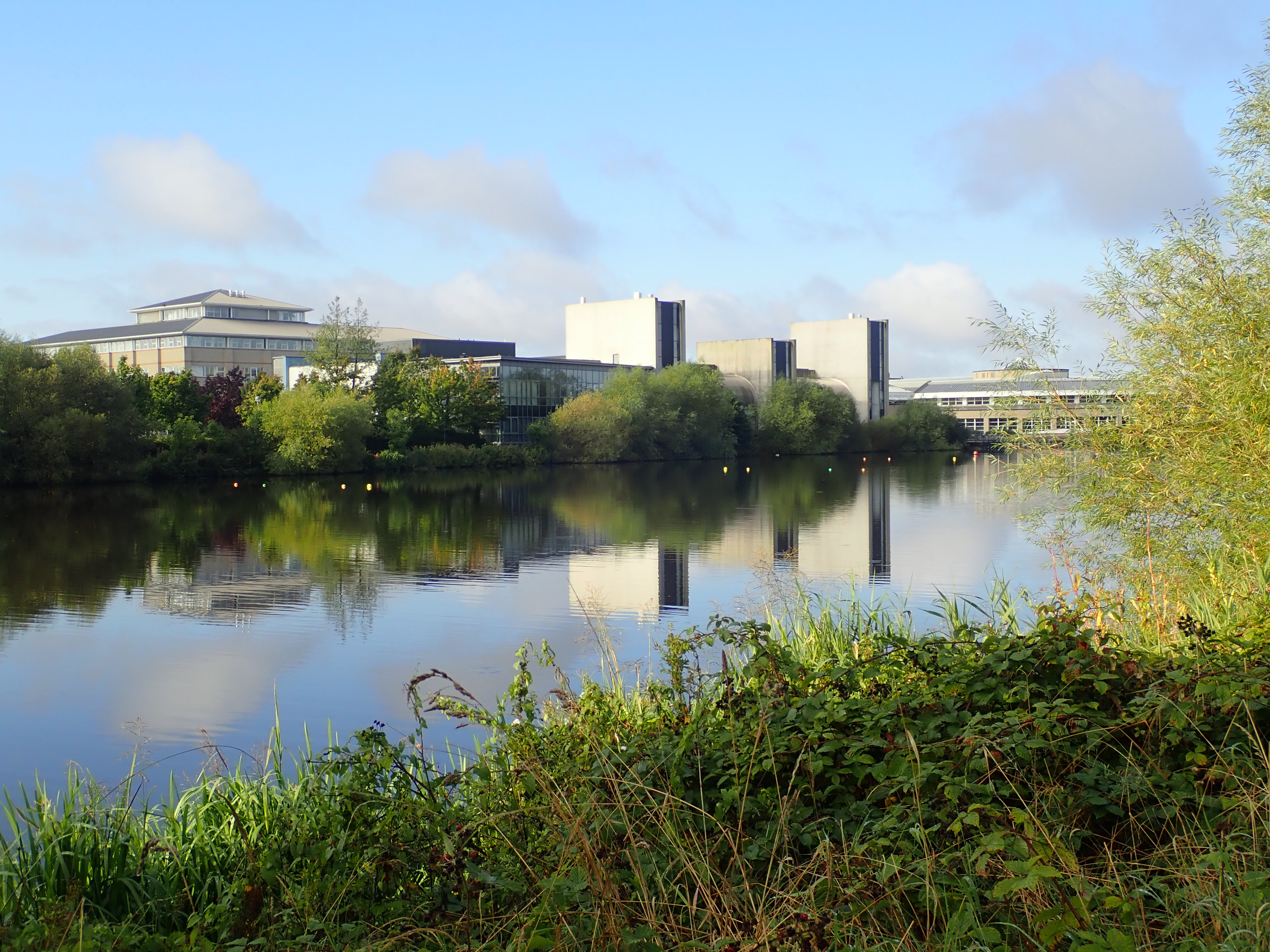
Wolfson Research Institute

Also in 2001 the new medical school at UDSC (operating in association with the University of Newcastle upon Tyne) took in its first students – the first medics to join Durham since 1963 – and the Wolfson Research Institute opened. In 2002, her golden jubilee year, the Queen granted UDSC the title of "Queen's Campus".

2002 saw the location for degree congregations moved from Stockton Parish Church to Durham Cathedral. By 2003, 10 years after Stockton's opening, the campus had 1914 undergraduates and 54 full-time postgraduates. By 2013 this had increased to 2114 undergraduates and 124 postgraduates.

In 2007 the university announced that it had acquired an option on 4-acre (16,000 m^{2}) of land in the 56-acre North Shore development on the north bank of the Tees, opposite the existing Queen's Campus site, along with plans to develop the academic structure at Queen's and the possibility of a new college. In 2012 it was announced that after a four-year delay due to the state of the economy, the North Shore development was proceeding, including plans from the university for academic facilities and a 500-bed residential development.

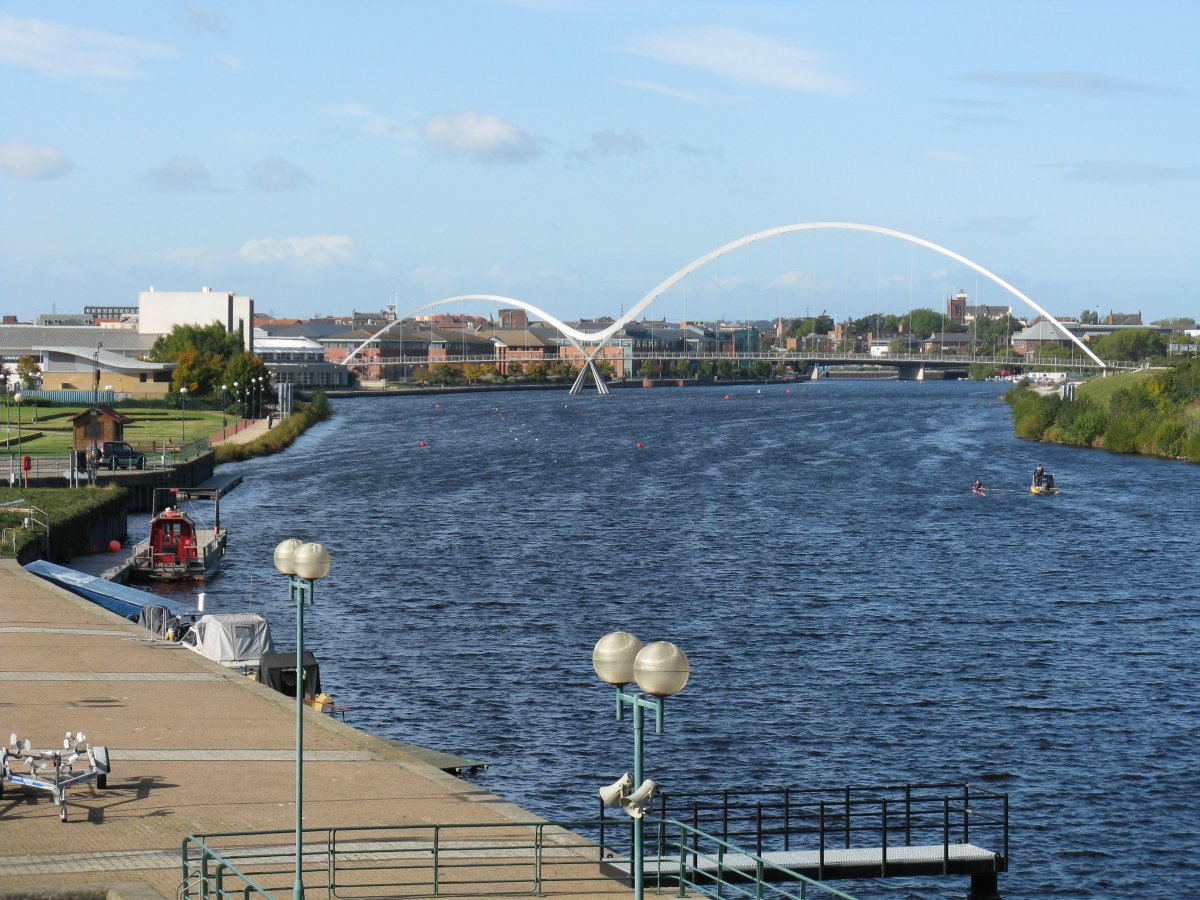
Infinity Bridge, joining the campus (left) to the planned North Shore development

The Queen's Campus cafeteria was reopened after renovation in February 2008 to serve as a dining room, the Waterside Restaurant, used two evenings a week by each of the two Queen's Campus colleges, and their joint college bar, the Waterside Bar. On 14 May 2009 the Infinity Bridge was opened, linking the Queen's Campus and the Teesdale Business Park to the North Shore development.

In July 2012, Durham University Council endorsed a "residential accommodation strategy" for 2012–2020, setting predicted growth in student numbers at Queen's Campus to 2,500 by 2015/16 and 3,400 by 2019/20, and a target of 50–70% of students housed in University accommodation. With 900 beds in Stockton for 2012/13, meeting the accommodation targets would require 730 new beds by 2015 and 1,150 by 2019.

In 2015, University College London used Queen's Campus as the first of five case studies into university and community-led urban regeneration, in parallel with the announcement of the development of their UCL East campus at the Queen Elizabeth Olympic Park in east London.

=== Closure as university campus and opening of International Study Centre ===
In November 2015 it was announced that the university would not be renewing its option on development of the site on the north bank of the Tees and would be holding a consultation on the future of the Queen's Campus.

In February 2016 it was announced that the university's working group had recommended moving the colleges and academic activities currently at the Queen's Campus to Durham City from September 2017. This decision was confirmed in May 2016, with the School of Medicine, Pharmacy and Health being transferred to Newcastle University on 1 August 2017. Transfer of the remaining departments, and John Snow and Stephenson Colleges, to Durham was completed by 2019.

Queen's Campus was taken over by a new International Study Centre, run by Study Group. This prepares non-EU foreign students to enter degree courses at the university, with the first students having started in September 2017. The ISC took over the former college accommodation on the campus, with the former Stephenson College buildings becoming Endeavour Court and the former John Snow College buildings becoming Infinity House. The ISC also continued to use the privately owned Rialto Court accommodation, which was previously used by the Queen's Campus colleges. According to the university's 2017–2027 masterplan, it planned to explore other options for the use of the Queen's Campus and would be developing a separate masterplan for the campus.

A bus connects Queen's Campus to Durham City, with a one-way journey usually taking 45 minutes.

Infinity House was sold to L1 Capital in January 2020. In 2021/22, the Wolfson and Ebsworth buildings on the campus were used for teaching; from 2022/23 teaching has been concentrated in Ebsworth. As of June 2024, Rialto Court and Infinity House were offered as accommodation options. Endeavour Court was sold in March 2024, and was brought back into use as accommodation for DUISC by Mezzino. It was announced in 2026 that the university planned to sell the disused Holliday Building. The Wolfson Building is used by NHS England, including for the regional teaching programme for postgraduate doctors in training to become general practitioners.
