= Van Mildert College, Durham =

Constituent college of Durham University

Van Mildert College
- Durham University
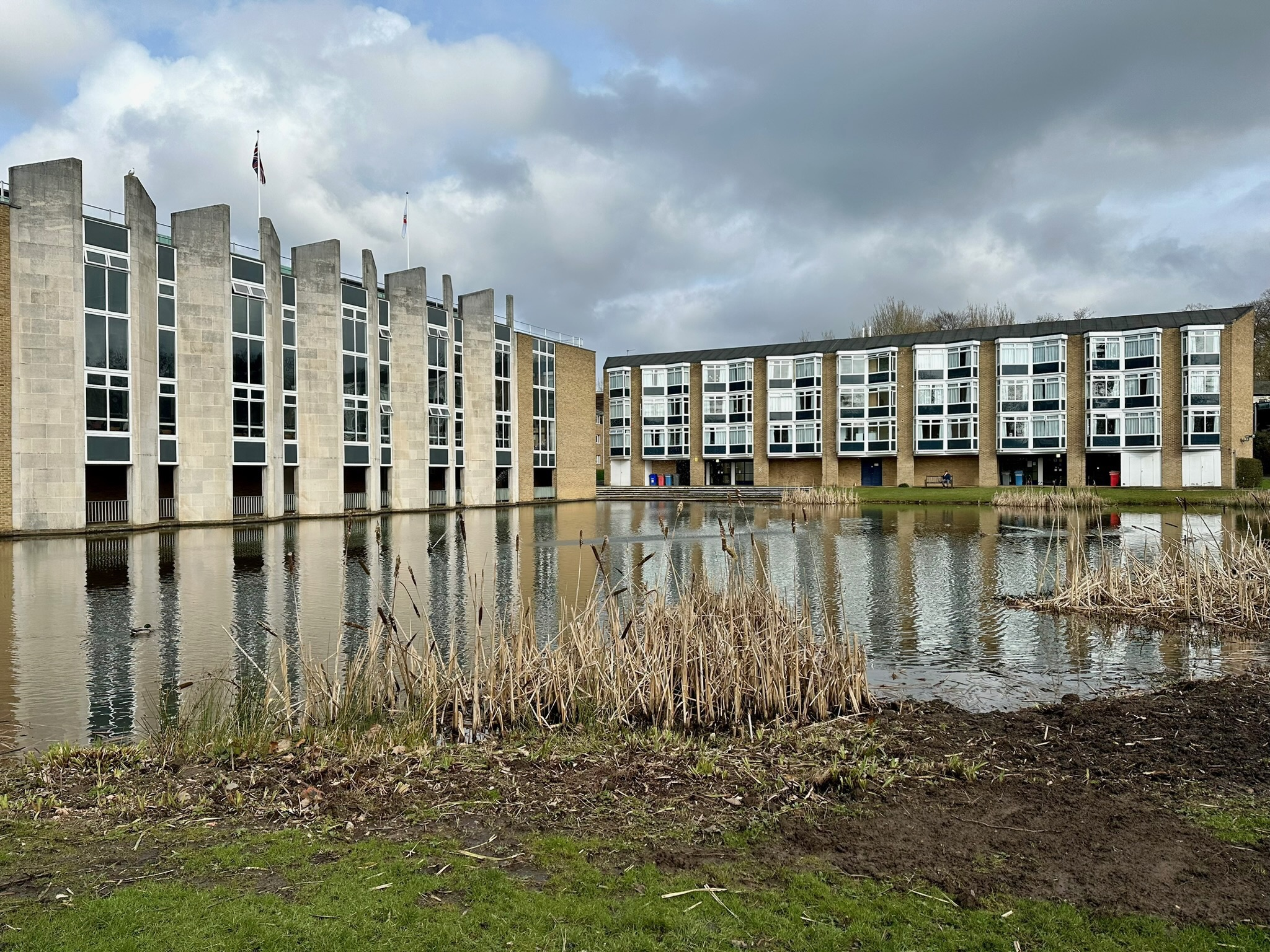
- Van Mildert main college building and lake

- Arms of Van Mildert College; Arms: Gules, two scythe blades in saltire, in chief the cross of St. Cuthbert argent
- Location: Mill Hill Lane, Durham, DH1 3LH
- Coordinates: 54.7631°N 1.5810°W
- Abbreviation: VM
- Motto: Latin: Sic vos non vobis
- Motto in English: Thus do ye, Not for yourselves
- Established: 1965
- Named after: William Van Mildert, Prince Bishop of Durham
- Sister college: Halifax College, York
- Principal: Tom Mole
- Vice principal: Katie Dowson
- Undergraduates: 1376 (2022/23)
- Postgraduates: ± 200 (2022/23)
- Website: Van Mildert College
- JCR: VM Junior Common Room
- MCR: VM Middle Common Room
- SCR: VM Senior Common Room
- Boat club: Van Mildert Boat Club

Map
- Location within Durham, England

Van Mildert College (colloquially known as Van Mil or Mildert) is one of the 17 constituent colleges of Durham University. The college was founded in 1965 and takes its name from William Van Mildert, the last Prince-Bishop to rule the County Palatine of Durham and a leading figure in the university's foundation. Originally an all-male college, Van Mildert admitted female undergraduates for the first time in 1972, making it the first Durham college to become mixed.

The college occupies grounds of 8 acres (3 hectares) alongside South Road and Mill Hill Lane, about 1 mile (2 kilometres) south of the university town, and is centred on a small lake. Designed by Middleton, Fletcher & Partners, the college was built in a modernist and egalitarian architectural style that aimed to house the sudden influx of students in the early 1960s. The college is notable for its lake, named Lake Mildert, and its Ann Dobson Dining Hall which is the largest student dining hall in Durham.

The college is the third largest collegiate body in the university by total numbers of affiliated students, just behind University College, and is reputed for its community feel and relative informality compared with other Durham colleges. Almost half of home students admitted are from grammar school and it is one of the 7 colleges of Durham that does not require its students to don their gown, though the traditional Durham custom of formal dining are still performed and taken pride of.

Among Van Mildert's notable alumni are former Minister of State for Women The Baroness Morgan of Huyton, World Record triple jump Olympic champion Jonathan Edwards, the cosmologist and Templeton Prize winner John D. Barrow, English judge of the UK Supreme Court Lord Hughes of Ombersley, and Turkish Prince Naz Osmanoglu.

== History ==
Van Mildert College was established as a men's college in 1965 following recommendations of the Robbins Report looking into the future of higher education in the UK. In 1963, King's College in Newcastle declared itself independent from the University of Durham, meaning new colleges were required to meet the new university places that the Government wished to create. As a result, the university planned to establish three new colleges on Elvet Hill which went on to be named Collingwood College, Trevelyan College and Van Mildert College.

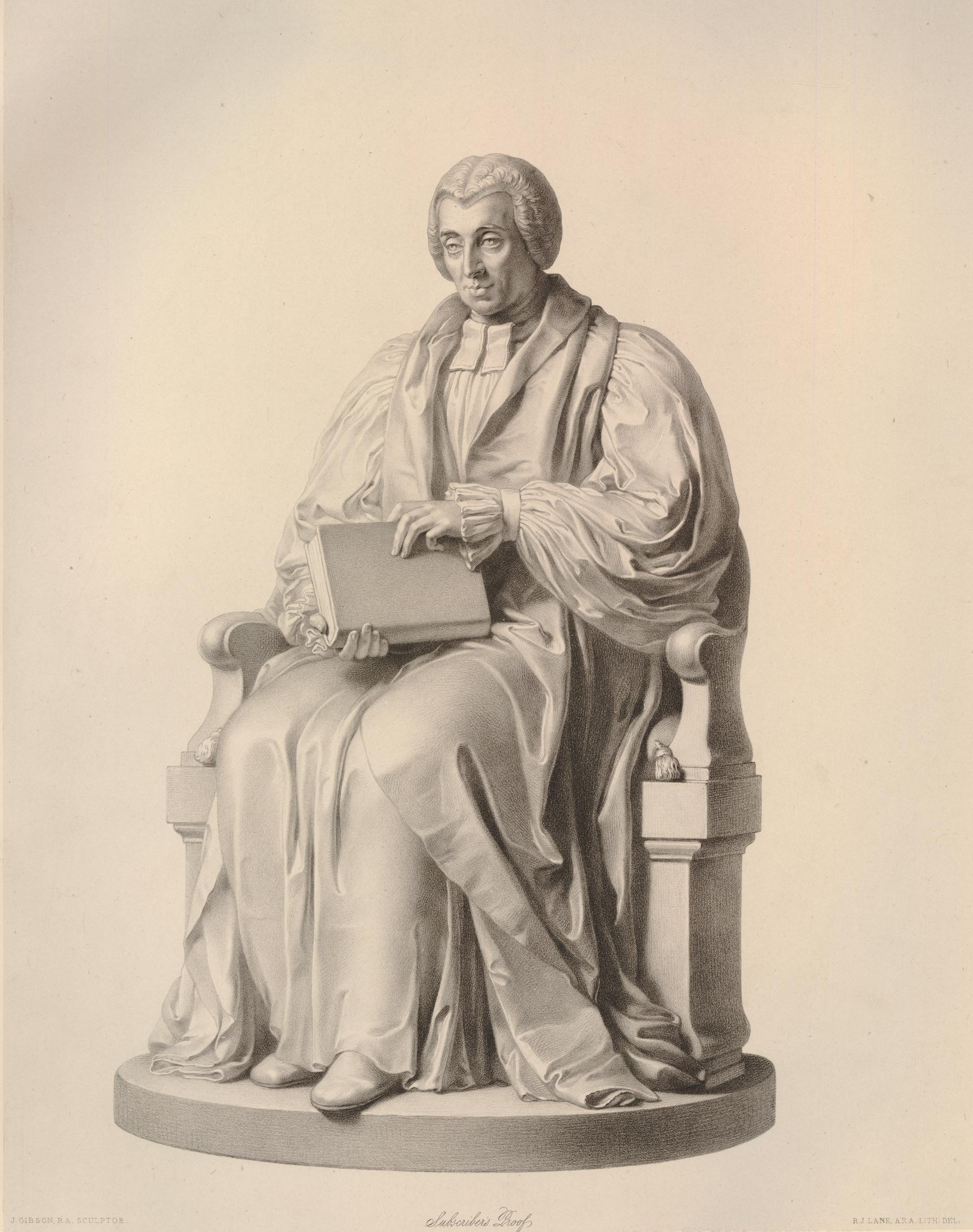
The Prince-Bishop of Durham, William Van Mildert, 1765–1836, was instrumental in the founding of Durham University, after whom the college is named

The college marks its foundation in 1965 when the first students were admitted, with the first college master, Dr Arthur Prowse, already been appointed in 1964. Initially, the college only accepted men, but during the college's early years, it also temporarily accommodated (albeit not accepting them as members) of over 50 women from other colleges. Together with the first Senior Tutor, Arnold Bradshaw, Prowse established the participatory, liberal, and forward-looking culture that Van Mildert maintains to this day. In October 1965, the founder students took up residence in Parson's Field House, though it was not long before the college moved to its permanent site on Elvet Hill by Michaelmas 1966. The College permanent site was designed by Middleton, Fletcher & Partners of Middlesbrough, which features a small lake to accommodate the site's tendency to become waterlogged. This lake, along with its flock of ducks, remains a distinctive feature of the college and the main College building, located next to the lake, included the Dining Hall and servery, a library, bar, common rooms, and offices.

On 13 June 1967, the college was officially opened by the Archbishop of Canterbury, Michael Ramsey, who had previously served as Van Mildert Professor of Divinity at Durham and was a friend of Arthur Prowse. By this time, the college had reached its full capacity, with around 300 undergraduates, along with some graduate students and resident members of the Senior Common Room. This period also set the stage for Van Mildert to become mixed in the future.

=== 1970 to 1976: Pioneering for mixed-sex education ===
In 1970, the Governing Body of the College took decision to go mixed and to construct a new accommodation block, named Middleton Stairs after architect Philip Middleton. In those time as well that the college cooperated closely with Collingwood College, and housed their initial students while their buildings were being finished. The two college shared facilities, with two Masters, Dr Paul Kent and Mr Peter Bayley, presiding over at opposite ends of the Hall. The College admitted its first female students in 1967 reading for Certificates in Education, though undergraduate women were only formally welcomed in Michaelmas term 1972, with a few already transferring in 1971, making Van Mildert the first Durham college to go mixed.

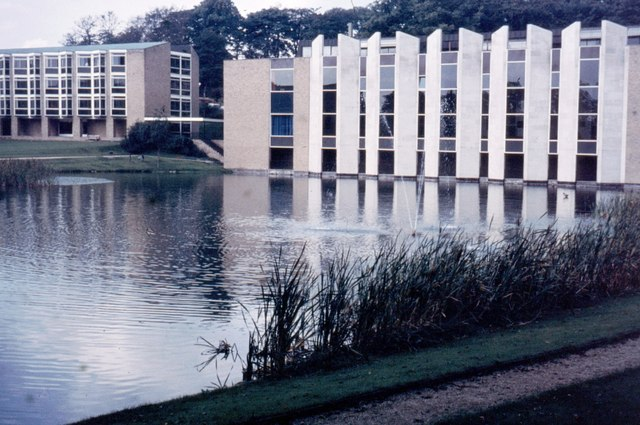
A view of Main College and Derwent Block from Lake Mildert in 1971

The college's population grew steadily, reaching 498 in 1976. Internal reorganisations expanded the library and bar, and additional accommodation was acquired. The 1986 opening of the Conference Centre provided new meeting rooms and boosted the college conference business. In 1990, the Tunstall Building added 30 single ensuite bedrooms, followed by the Deerness block in 2002 with 97 single ensuite rooms, allowing the college to house 515 students, including all first-years and some final-year and graduate students. By 2013, Van Mildert had grown to a community of over 1,000 students, staff, and tutors from around the world.

== Overview ==
=== Governance and legal status ===
Van Mildert is a maintained college, which are governed directly by, and are financially dependent on, the university. Van Mildert's principals and staffs are appointed by University Council and are overseen by the Deputy Warden, who is also a member of the University Executive Committee, and so does not enjoy independence unlike most of Oxbridge colleges and Durham's two other recognised colleges of St John's and St Chad's.

The college is headed by a Principal (previously titled Master until 1988), a vice-principal and a board of governors. Some members sits as governor by virtue of holding another office (ex officio):

- The Principal (chairman),
- The Vice-Chancellor and Warden
- The Vice-Principal and Senior Tutor,
- The Bursar
- The President of the Senior Common Room
- The Chaplain
- The President of the Middle Common Room
- The President of the Junior Common Room

College tutors and the Junior Common Room and a representative of the University Council also elects members to sit on the governing body.

As a constituent college of Durham University, Van Mildert College is recognised as a "listed bodies" in the Education (Listed Bodies) (England) Order 2013 made under the Education Reform Act 1988. The legal status of Van Mildert College is thus similar to those colleges in Oxford and Cambridge and the dissolution of the college will only take effect if approved by the Privy Council.

=== Buildings and grounds ===
The college and its main entrance are located at the eastern end of Mill Hill Lane, neighbouring South College and John Snow College to its west, Elvet Hill Road to its east and South Road to its south. The front of the college runs between St Aidan's College, Teikyo University and the Oriental Museum, whilst the back entrance along Lake Mildert partly neighbours Collingwood College. Van Mildert building blocks are architecturally modernist, many of which are named after local rivers, which are Tyne, Tees, Derwent, Wear, and Deerness (postgraduates only). Two accommodation blocks are not named in this convention with Tunstall block named after a town in Sunderland and Middleton stairs named after the architect that conceptualised the college. Unlike the Bailey colleges where accommodation blocks are spread around the city, all of Van Mildert's accommodation are situated within the college grounds, and the college is in the process of refurbishing each of the buildings in turn. In total the college can provide around 525 single rooms for its student members.

The post of college principal in Van Mildert College also comes with residential benefits, and that they are entitled to use and live in the Principal's House (formerly Master's House) which are located by South Road neighbouring Southend House. The college also owns a boat house by Kingsgate Footbridge and a tennis court. Tees Lawn, which are situated within the college grounds are often used by college members for recreational purposes.

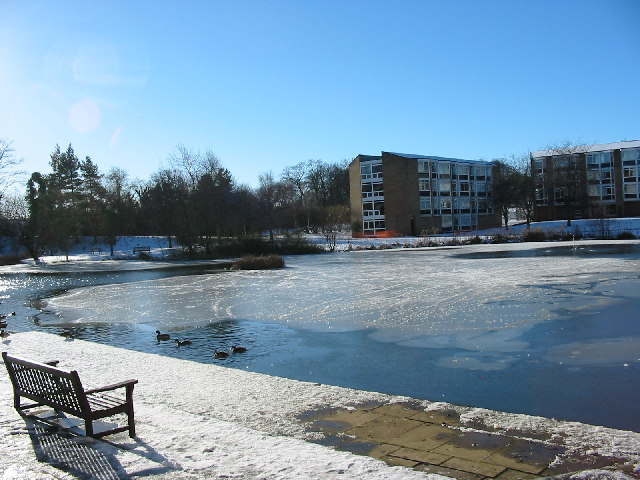
Wear and Tees accommodation blocks

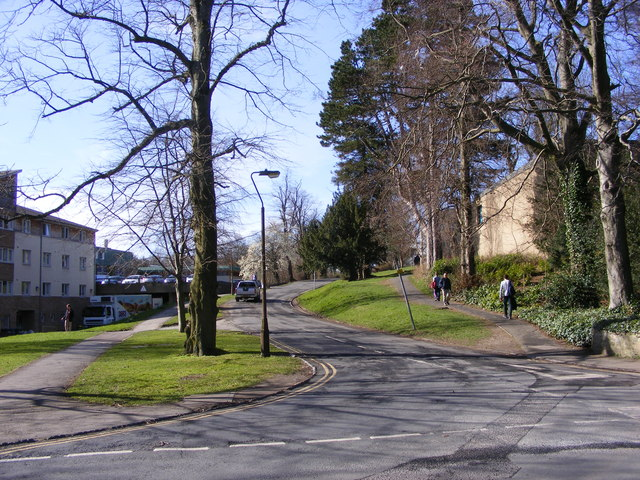
The view up Millhill Lane from Elvet Hill Road, with Van Mildert College on the left

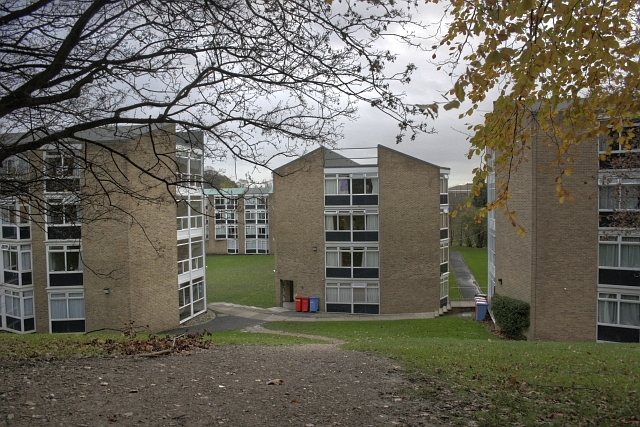
Middleton, Tees and Derwent Block

In 2024, Van Mildert College was criticised for not being able to accommodate returning students into college accommodation for the academic year whilst still having at least 70 unoccupied beds (16% unoccupied) within the college grounds.

=== Ann Dobson Dining Hall ===
The college's Dining Hall, the Ann Dobson Dining Hall (colloquially the "Annie D"), is the largest student dining hall in Durham. It measures 30.8m by 13.2m and can seat approximately 350 members at formal hall.The dining hall is used for a variety of functions over the academic year and plays a central role in the lives of livers-in (a Durham term for students who lives in college) as it is where college meals and formals are held.

In the 1960s, members of the college often enjoyed concerts featuring well known artistes, such as Shura Cherkassky and Peter Pears, though this has not persisted. Today, the hall still acts as a venue for drama productions and as a sports hall for college members.

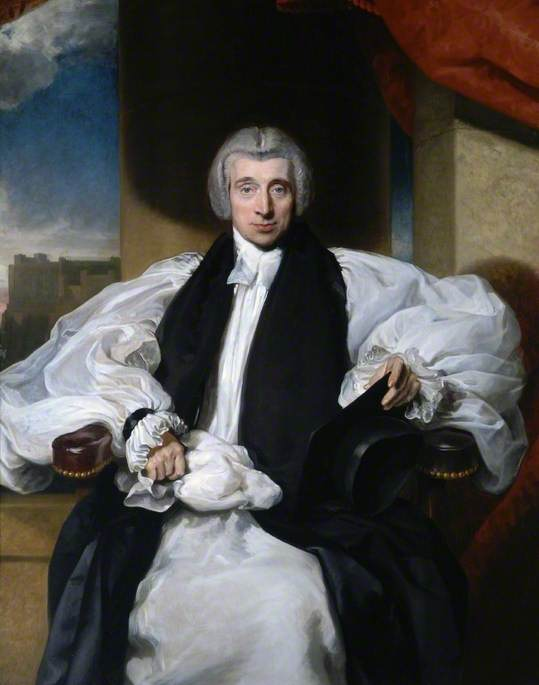
Portrait of William Van Mildert by Thomas Lawrence (1829) hangs in the college dining hall

A copy of a portrait of William Van Mildert, whom the college is named after, hangs at one end of the dining hall, along with portraits of the former Principals and Masters of the college.

=== Libraries ===
The Bradshaw Room is the main library of Van Mildert College and is open 24 hours a day. It is equipped with over 12,000 books & journals and, along with St John's College Archives, is the only other College library in Durham to be listed in The National Archives. The Bradshaw Room also houses a Library2careers, study-skills section, and course-related DVDs, and it overlooks the Mildert Lake.

The Kent Room, which is located across the corridor from Bradshaw is also regularly used by college members and it contains most of the college fiction collections. It is also often used for study groups.

=== Mildert's Inn ===
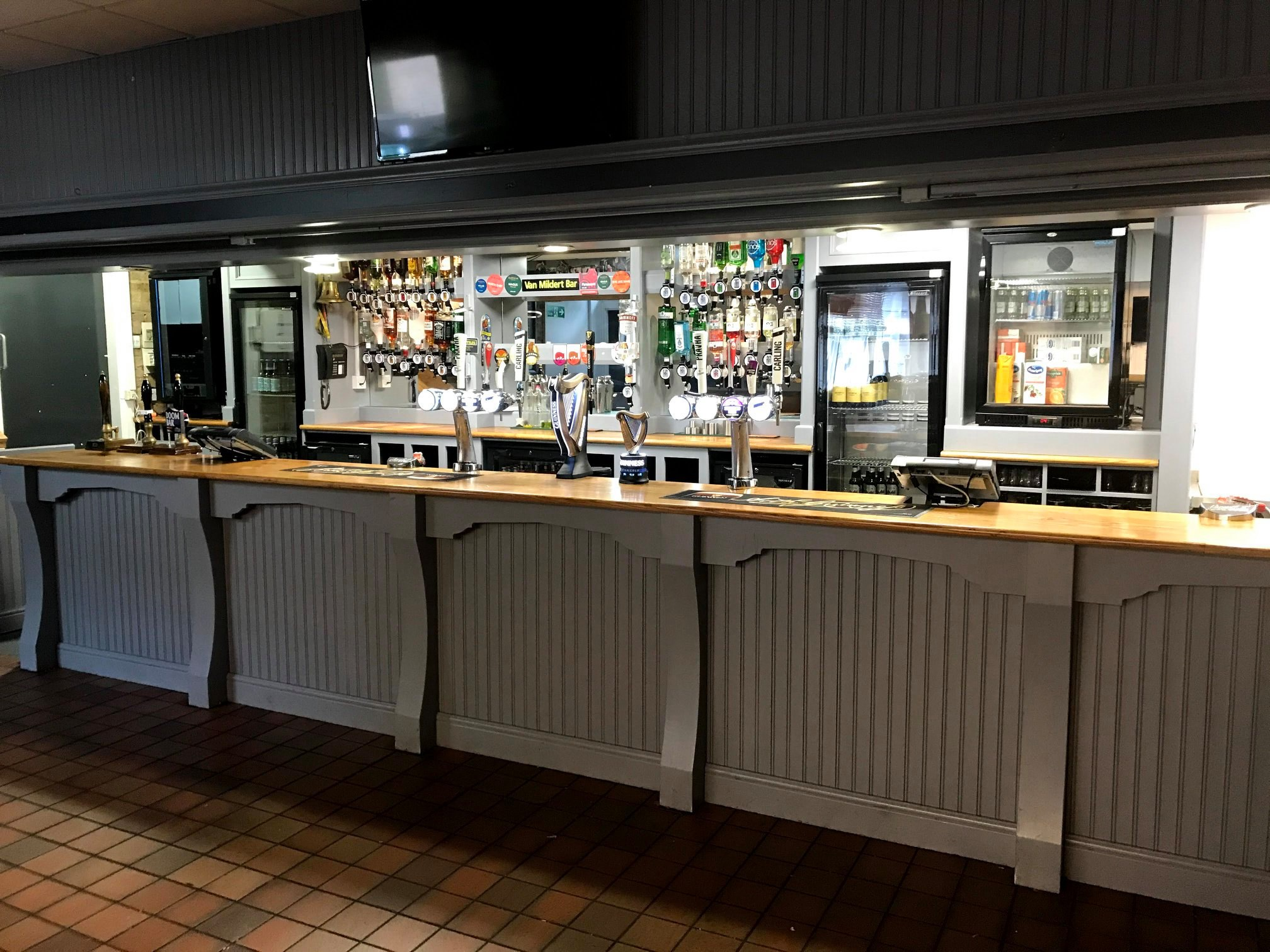
Van Mildert bar

The Van Mildert College Bar (also known as Mildert's Inn which few known) is a recently refurbished bar used by both members of the college and students from other colleges. It is also generally used for holding JCR meetings during term time and in recent years has won the 'University Bar' category of the Best Bar None and awards from Durham City for the 2008–09 and 2010–11 academic years. Most recently, Van Mildert's Bar has also won the 'Gold' category for the Best Bar None Awards for the year 2016–17.

The Bar produces its own brand of ale called 'Treasure in the Swamp' and serves other alcoholic and non-alcoholic drinks and/or alcohol alternatives. The bar is infamous for its college drink – ‘The Little Lad’ and ‘Shrek Juice’.

=== Lake Mildert and Tees Lawn ===
The lake is perhaps the most distinctive physical features of the college and is an integral part of the college's identity and community, and a valuable environmental resources for a variety of plants and animals. In the not too distant past, it has been used as an ice rink by college members when the lake water froze in the winter, and rowing boats have traversed it at summer balls. There were also plans to convert the area nearest to Main College into an outdoor swimming pool, although this was not eventually realised. The lake has now toxic water warning and is out of bounds at all times, with transgression of the rule taken very seriously by the College Officers.

The college recorded at least 10 species of wildlife to be thriving within the college grounds, which includes the Grey Herons and the infamous species of Van Mildert ducks, the Mallards. Now an enviable haven for wildlife, the college grounds host a new cohort of ducklings every year and its water lilies around the lake provides sanctuary for a plethora of animals. The lake is aerated by the two fountains, which provide a home for various fish and plants.

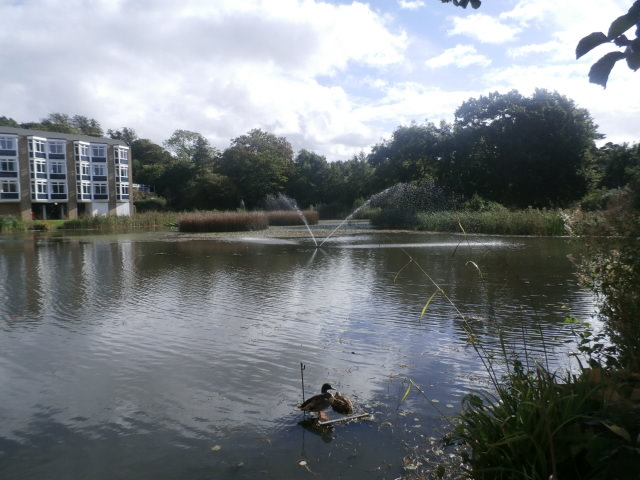
Lake Mildert

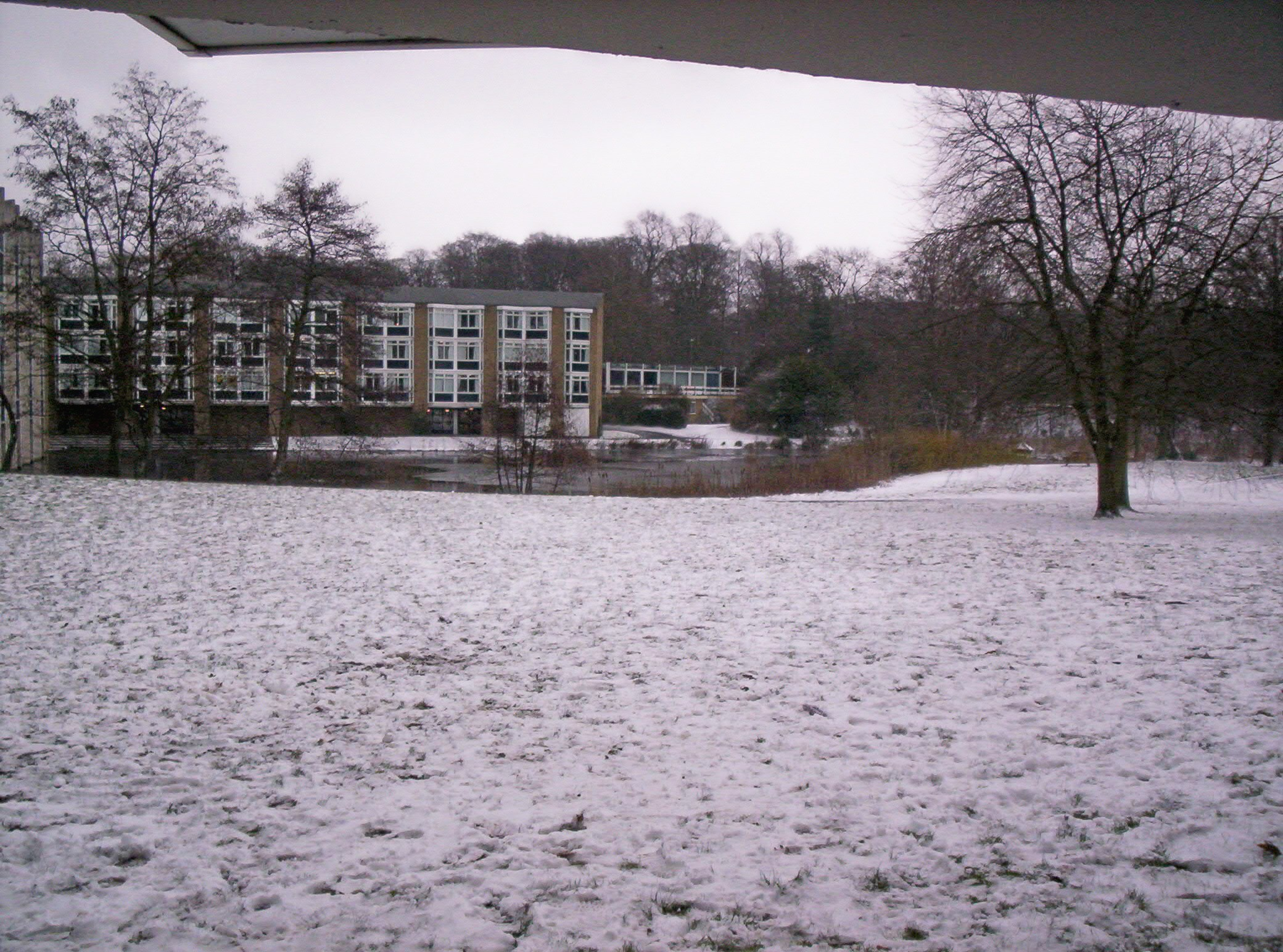
Tees Lawn in winter

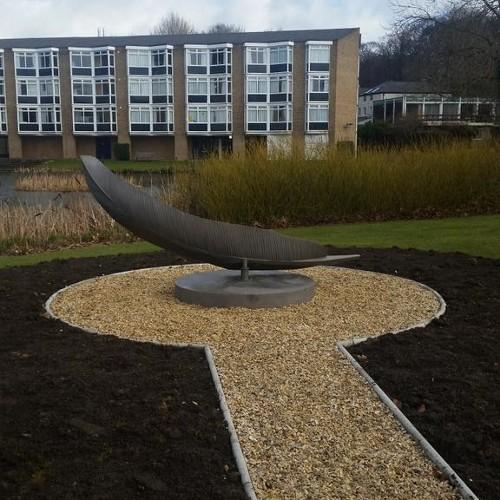
The Mildert Feather (2015)

Tees Lawn is a meadow situated between Tees, Wear and Derwent Block facing towards Lake Mildert. The lawn is used extensively by college members during the summer and it is used to host the annual college Michaelmas ball. A sculpture entitled The Mildert Feather was commissioned by Danish artist Erik Heide to mark the college 50th anniversary. The sculpture is mounted on a rotating base on the lawn, which is designed to move with the wind.

=== Other facilities ===
The college has other social facilities, including three music/recording suite, a gym, computer room, shop, tennis court and a full-size snooker table. Its music rooms also includes a drum kit, a keyboard, guitar amps, and a grand piano selected exclusively from Steinway & Sons by former JCR President, Henry Bashford.

The Van Mildert's Junior Common Room is used for many of the social events that are organised by the JCR, such as bops, ents after Formals, band nights and amateur theatre productions. Having recently been refurbished, the JCR lounge offers table tennis and a plasma screen TVs with Sky TV, which are used to show major sporting fixtures during the academic term, as well as sofas and comfy seating. Members of the Middle Common Room have a dedicated postgraduate social space facility known as the MCR Bankside Room and is located on the ground floor of the Deerness block and includes facilities such as a TV, coffee machine, games console and study space. Members of the Senior Common Room makes use of the Prowse Room, which are located behind the Ann Dobson Dining Hall, and opposite the Lakeside Room. The SCR Prowse Room has tea and coffee machine and a reading room.

== Academic profile ==
In the year 2016–2017, 46% of Van Mildert undergraduates achieved Firsts, half a percentage points ahead of the last place Grey in the Evans Table, which lists the university's 16 undergraduate colleges in order of their students’ examination performances, a system loosely based on Oxford's Norrington Table and Cambridge's Tompkins Table of college rankings. In recent years, its academic performance has skyrocketed with the college now ranking 7th in 2021–2022, ahead of St Chad's but below St John's.

The college is renowned for its emphasis on outreach and volunteering activities, with students of the college clocking up to 6300 volunteering hours. This is more than any Durham Colleges and have disproportionately represented half of university-wide volunteering activities. Additionally, the college has 6 outreach projects, with the oldest being the Young Person's Project (YPP). In 2017, the college won the community category of the Green Gown Awards and was featured in the 2020 Parliamentary Review for best practice in Education Services.

Van Mildert has close connections with the Institute of Advanced Study, with the college offering two fellowships position for visiting scholars; the Arthur Prowse Fellowship, named after the college's first Master, and the Arnold Bradshaw Fellowship. The fellowships are typically awarded for one academic term with the fellow residing in the college and becoming a member of the SCR. Recent fellows have included Adi Ophir and Mikhail Epstein. The Climate Impacts Research Centre is also closely associated with Van Mildert and frequently hosts lectures within the college.

=== Admission ===
Van Mildert accepts students from all academic disciplines and up to 1972, only accepted men. As in other Durham colleges, all admissions are handled centrally by the university, though the college have some role in the admissions of students, which are confined to identifying students that suit the college ethos and atmosphere – departments are responsible for admissions to the university, each college for admissions to that college.

Almost half of home students admitted to Van Mildert are from grammar school, though information of if it was selective or not is not held. In 2022/23, 37% of new undergraduate students are privately educated.

=== Collegiate studies ===
The college hosts a student enrichment programme known as the Dimensions Programme, which includes provision of a broad-ranging series of lectures, seminars and debates, along with skills-based activities such as networking sessions, employability initiatives and well-established work with the local community.

All first-year undergraduate at Van Mildert are allocated a college mentor, who are, for the most part, members of the academic staff of the college. In some cases, former alumni and current members of the MCR are also tasked to mentor undergraduate students. These students are obliged to attend weekly mentoring session, commonly over lunch on a Wednesday, where they support the students in their academic and personal development. Second, third, and fourth year students may opt-in for mentoring, yet are not made a compulsory requirement by the college.

== Student life ==
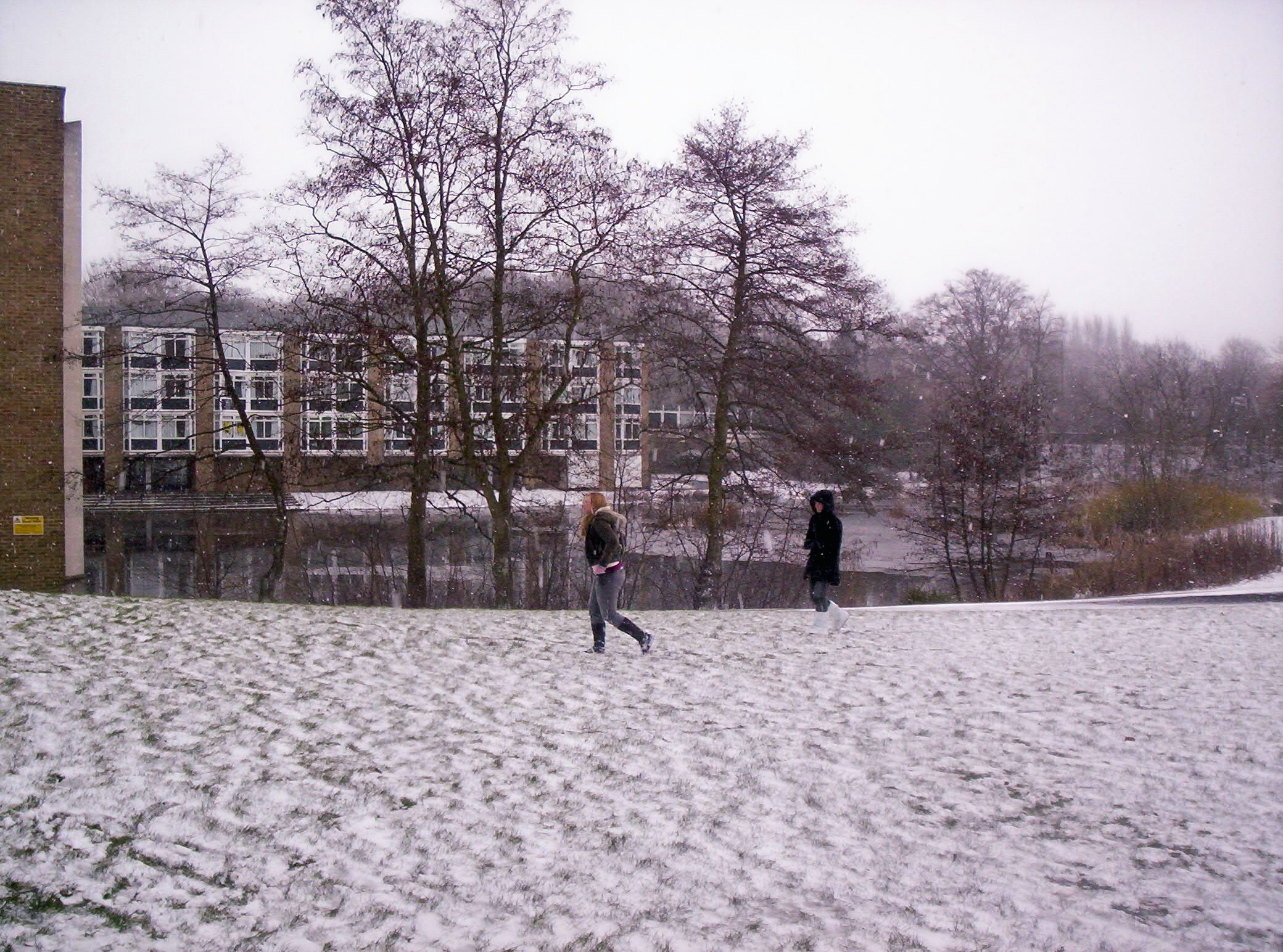
Van Mildert College in snow

Van Mildert has one of the largest undergraduate and graduate intakes among Durham colleges, admitting 376 undergraduates and at least 150 graduate students in the 2023–2024 academic year. All first year undergraduates board and lodge within the college, which means that they are obliged to live, dine and read for their degree within the college grounds, though this arrangement is not universal and may be waived for local students whom lived within the area. A typical fresher's room will have a single bed and are inclusive of heating, power, and internet access, and weekly cleaning by the college bedders (housekeepers). Second year students usually lives-out in the city with many finalists returning to live-in College. Arrangements for postgraduates varies, with the college reserving at least 61 rooms, mostly in Deerness Block for its graduate members.

Three cafeteria-style meals a day are served in the college dining hall, which are included in the boarding fee, where it is common for each hall corridors to go together. Out of term time, students who stays are permitted to use the kitchen facilities or bought meal directly in the college servery.

=== Academic dress ===
Van Mildert previously required its students to college gown to formal hall, matriculation, college congregations and other academic or formal events, as evident in a historical college matriculation photograph. It is not entirely sure precisely when or why the college dropped this convention, but college records has suggested that this tradition ceased with the admittance of women undergraduates in 1972.

Although the wearing of academic dress is no longer stipulated, formal dress (e.g. lounge suit and dress) is required in every formal events, such as matriculation and formal halls. In addition, students are required to wear black tie for men and ball gown for women at the end of term balls.

=== Common Rooms ===
All students of Van Mildert College are members of a common room, and which common room students are sorted solely depends on the level of study. All undergraduates are members of the Junior Common Room (JCR), and plays a central part in the life of the undergraduate community, offering social, recreational and welfare support to its students. The elected executive committee addresses many aspects of student life and liaises with the governing body and graduate student representatives. The governance of the JCR is stated in the constitution, which can only be amended by resolution of the JCR members during general meetings. Undergraduates constitute the majority of the student population of the college, with approximately 1200 JCR members as of the 2021–2022 academic year. Up until 2018 the Junior Common Room of Van Mildert College had a 236-page constitution, making it significantly longer than the Constitutions of most sovereign states. Following a referendum, Van Mildert JCR "declared independence" from the college authorities in 2019 and became an independent charity.

In June 2015, the Junior Common Room (JCR) of Van Mildert College was renamed the 'Jack Collins Room' by a majority vote of the student body of the JCR as the last action of the presidency of JCR President Fraser Burt, in honour of the departing student in question, for an unparalleled commitment across college life in four years at Van Mildert.

Graduate students of Van Mildert College are members of the Middle Common Room (MCR), which hosts its own events and benefits from a refurbished Common Room and separate accommodation in Deerness Block. It is similarly represented by the MCR Committee. Unique to the Van Mildert MCR is that all members of the MCR are also by virtue, members of both the Junior Common Room as well as the Senior Common Room, and therefore have the right to sit and dine in both low and high table, as well as having the right to vote in all the college's common rooms. Members of the MCR are also entitled to make use of all the JCR and SCR facilities available in addition to their own.

The principal, college tutors and other academic and professional services staff of the college forms the Senior Common Room (SCR), and traditionally sits at high table for formal dinner. Alumni and local communities may also be elected members of the SCR.

=== Formals ===
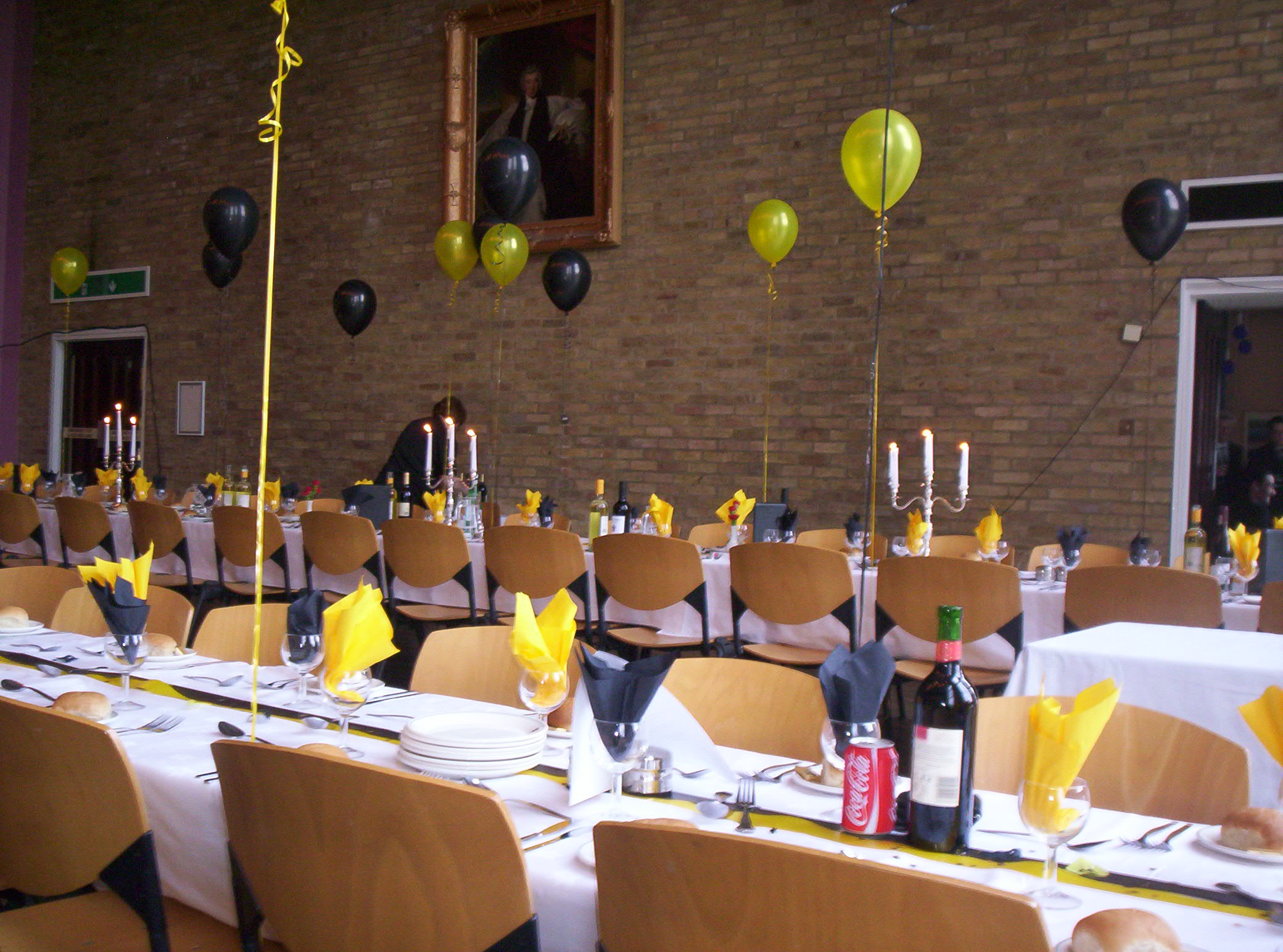
Mildert day mega-formal

Formals take place regularly during the academic term, with the college holding between three and five per term. Students are not required to wear their gown to formal dinners; instead, formal attire is worn except when it is a Ball where dinner jackets are worn. It is considered bad practice if attendees do not turn up in formal attire, and a popular college punishment is to run around the lake naked. At the end of the dining hall, a High Table composed of members of the SCR and their guests are present at every formal. Generally, members of the college gather in the College Bar 15–30 minutes before the start of the formal, and entrance into the dining hall is as announced by the JCR President with the ringing of the election bell, usually at 7 pm.

The High Table entrance and exit are then announced to attendees with another ringing of the election bell by the JCR President, signifying the official opening and closing of the formal meal. Speeches are common at formals and the Principal would also usually toasts the College motto, ‘sic vos non vobis’. Food at a formal meal usually consists of three courses and is often followed by an evening of entertainment.

The tradition of "pennying", as part of a meal or drinking game, whereby dropping a penny with the Queen's face in a person's drink means that they must finish it in order to ‘save the Queen’ from drowning is endured within the college.

=== Arts ===
The college has a number of groups involved in music, art, and the performing arts, collectively known as 'Van MildARTS'. The college hosts an annual arts week and annual musical, with recent productions being Cabaret, Our Country's Good, Guys and Dolls, Sweeney Todd: The Demon Barber of Fleet Street, Rent and Mama Mia! The college has a Big Band, Dance Society and Jam Society. This Society organises Jam by the Lake, the only open-air musical festival in County Durham and frequent winner of Purple Radio's 'Best Music Event' award.

=== Sports ===
The college has a sporting profile with a number of teams across a range of both traditional and non-traditional sports, including eight male football teams; two male rugby teams; a Women's Rugby team, Van Maidan's (joint with St Aidan's College); Cheerleading (with the College team having won the Inter-Collegiate Competition for five consecutive years); Ultimate Frisbee; Darts (most notably the Women's Darts "D Team"); and many more. Awards for graduating sports players are given at the Annual Sports Formal. This event celebrates the work and success of the sports teams, but more so the JCR Members who captain the teams and make up their Executive Committees.

==== Boat Club ====
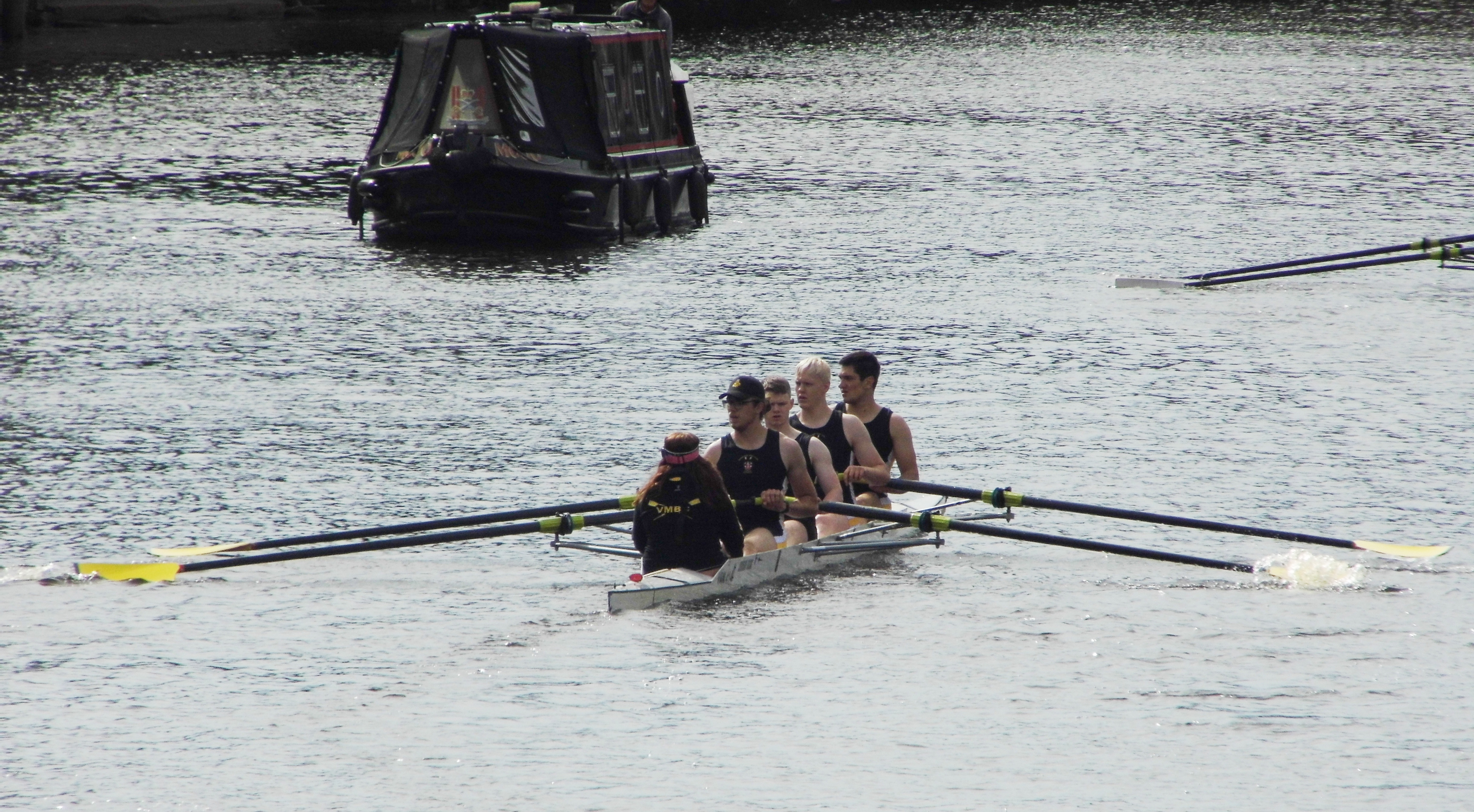
Van Mildert College Boat Club at the York Summer Regatta

Van Mildert Boat Club is the college rowing club. It was founded in 1965 by Simon Scott, an Engineering undergraduate at Durham University and one of the founding members of Van Mildert College. The boathouse of the club is on the River Wear, opposite Dunelm House and below Kingsgate Bridge.

The club competes against other college clubs in intercollegiate competitions organised by Durham College Rowing. It also takes part in regional events and national events (such as Head of the River Race, Women's Eights Head of the River Race and BUCS Regatta).

VMBC is a registered Boat Club through British Rowing, with Boat Code "VAN" and is a member organisation of Durham College Rowing.

The college boat house burnt down after an arsonist attacked it on 21 December 2021.

== Traditions ==
=== The Kazu ===
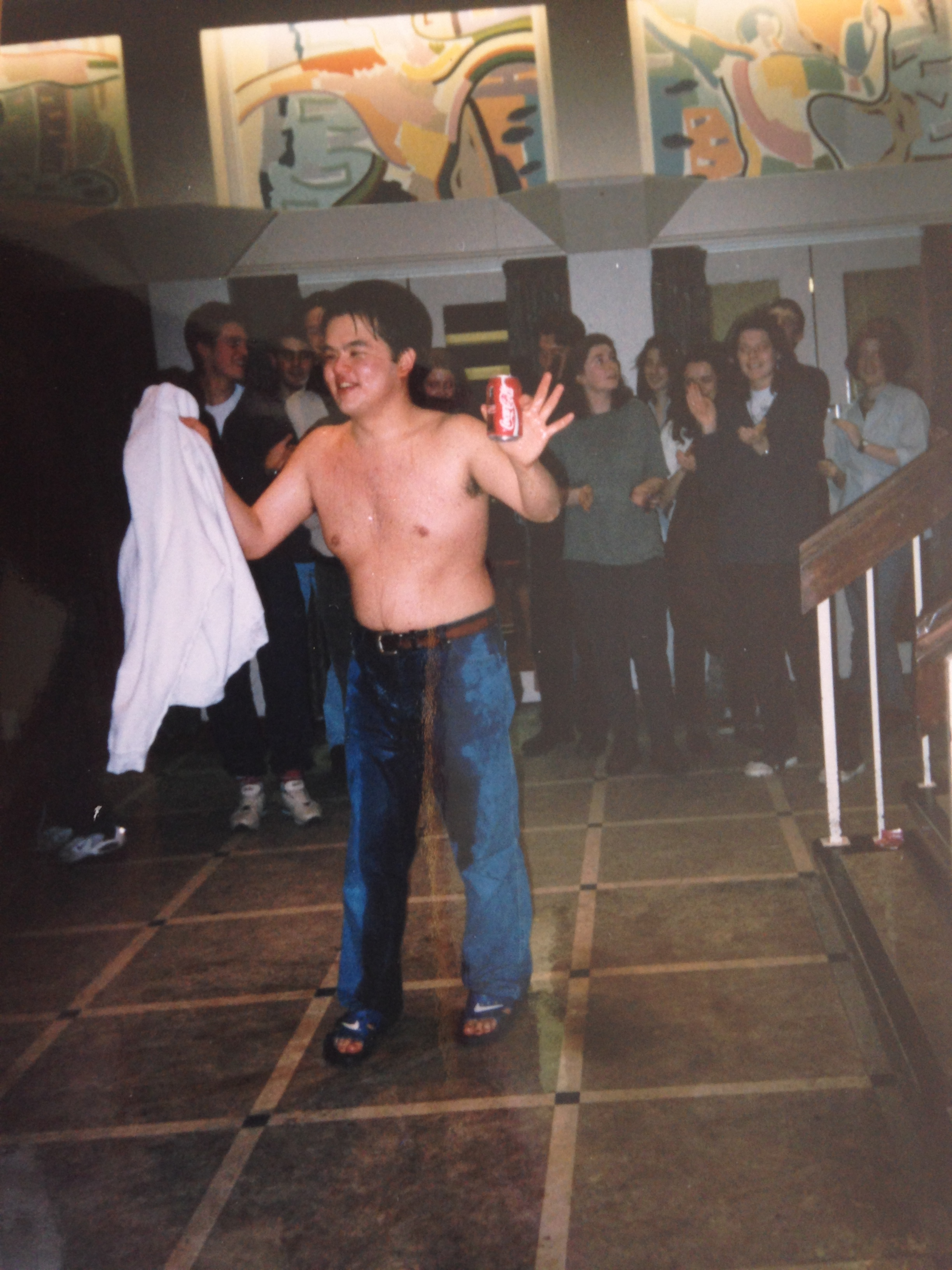
A Kazu being performed by Kazu

The Kazu is a traditional ceremony performed by the winning candidate after elections to the JCR Executive Committee, following the announcement of results by the JCR Chair. In more recent years, it has only been the elected president that performs a Kazu. A Kazu is a celebratory action which requires the winning candidate of every election to kick a full can of Coca-Cola down the stairs in the foyer, throw it over their head three times and then opening the can over their head. The JCR Standing Orders and website note that it "may be done wearing clothes" and that "Wikipedia knows more about Kazus than anyone in College".

The tradition was started by a Japanese exchange student called Kazuhisa who regularly performed the Kazu in the JCR foyer. The first official Kazu is a topic for debate, one was performed by James Mackenzie in March 1997, upon being elected JCR President, and one was performed by James Warburton on 1 March 1997 following his crowning as Mr. Durham 1997. Mr. Warburton represented his college as Mr. Van Mildert and performed a highly acclaimed Haka to win the Mr. University crown.

=== Keeper of the College Things ===
Until at least the 2000s, Van Mildert JCR's standing orders requires the annual election of a 'Keeper of the College Things'. This role emerge previously from an earlier position called 'Keeper of the College Darkroom' which lasted until at least the 1990s. The position of the Keeper of the College Things (KOTC) were specifically defined in the standing orders as to protect and maintain the care of college things, which includes: KOTC Ducks, whose duties includes the caring and protection of the college's duck, particularly newborn ducklings; KOTC Stubble, whose duties include maintaining college students facial hair growth visible for seventy percent (70%) of the academic year; and KOTC Grounds, which is responsible for the care of college grounds, its lake and the surrounding areas.

== People associated with Van Mildert ==
Principals, fellows (including honorary fellows) or students who read for a Durham degree in Van Mildert College. Graduates of the college are collectively known as Mildertians and are a part of the Van Mildert Association, which cater for more than 7,500 living alumni.

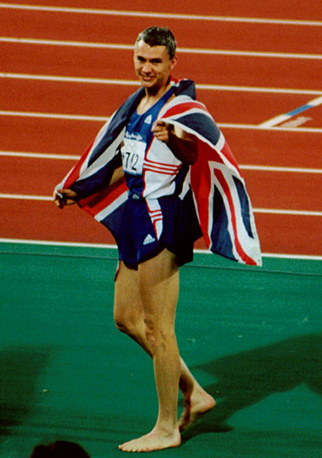
Jonathan Edwards, CBE (born 1966), former Olympic, World, Commonwealth and European triple jump champion, and has held the world record in the event since 1995.

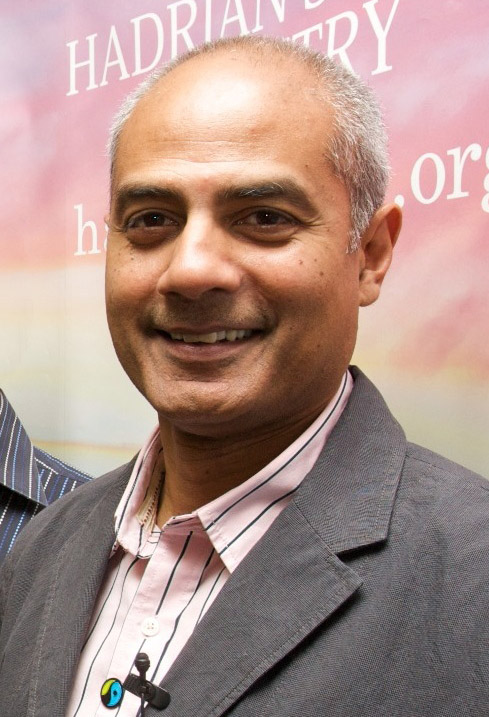
George Alagiah, OBE (1955–2023), British newsreader, journalist and television news presenter.

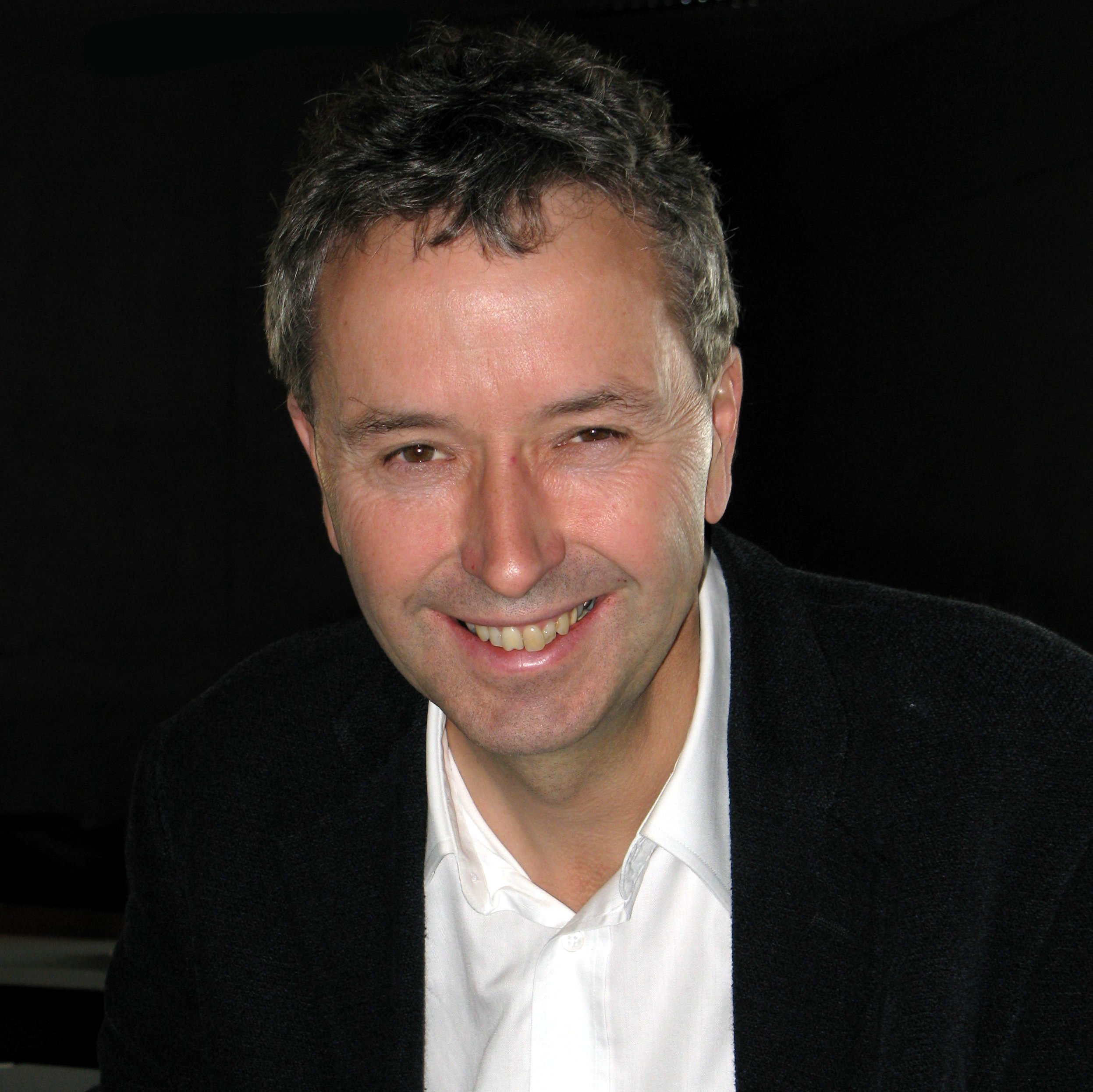
Frank Kelly, CBE, FRS (born 1950), academic, and former Master of Christ's College, Cambridge.

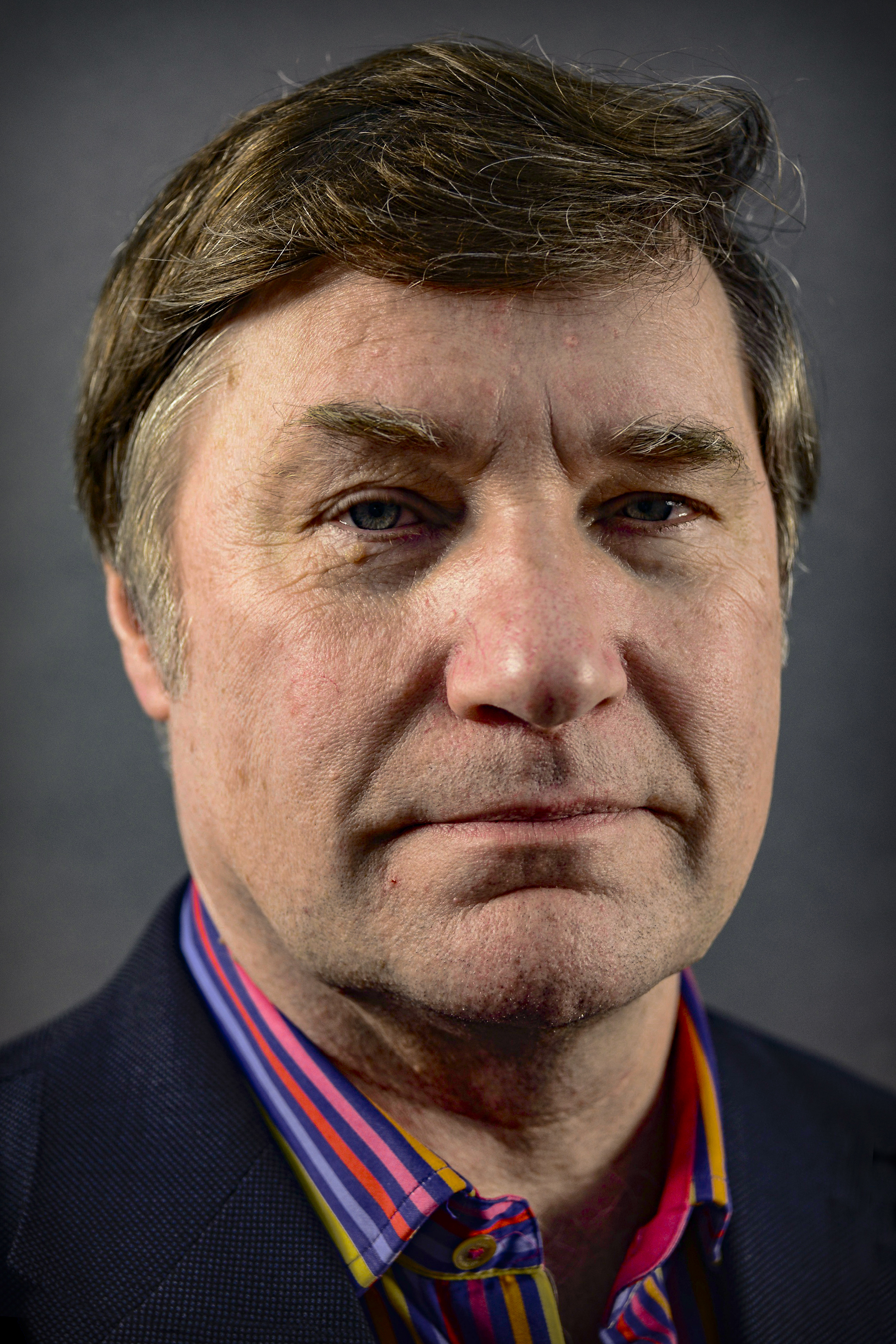
John D. Barrow, FRS (1952–2020) Cosmologist, 2006 Templeton Prize winner and Fellow of the Royal Society

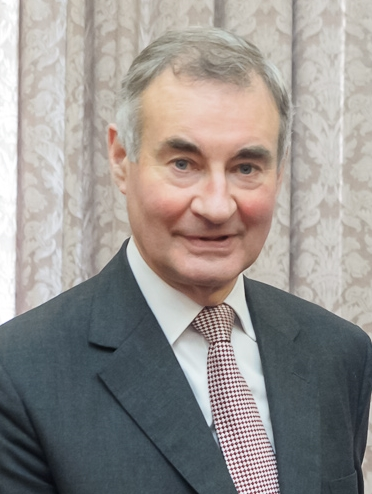
Lord Hughes of Ombersley, PC, HonFRS (born 1948), former English judge of the UK Supreme Court

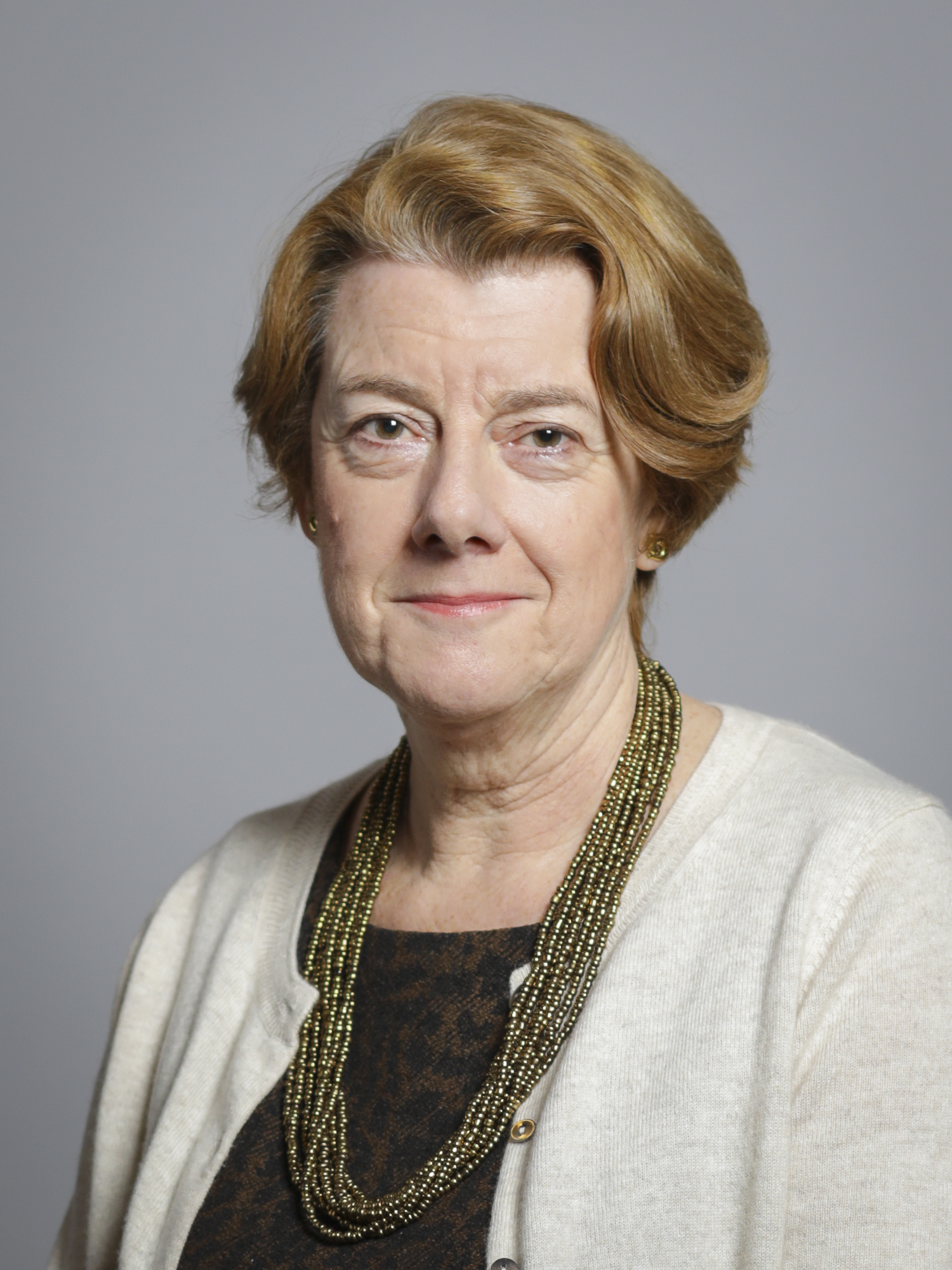
Baroness Morgan of Huyton (born 1959), former Minister of State for Women and Master of Fitzwilliam College, Cambridge

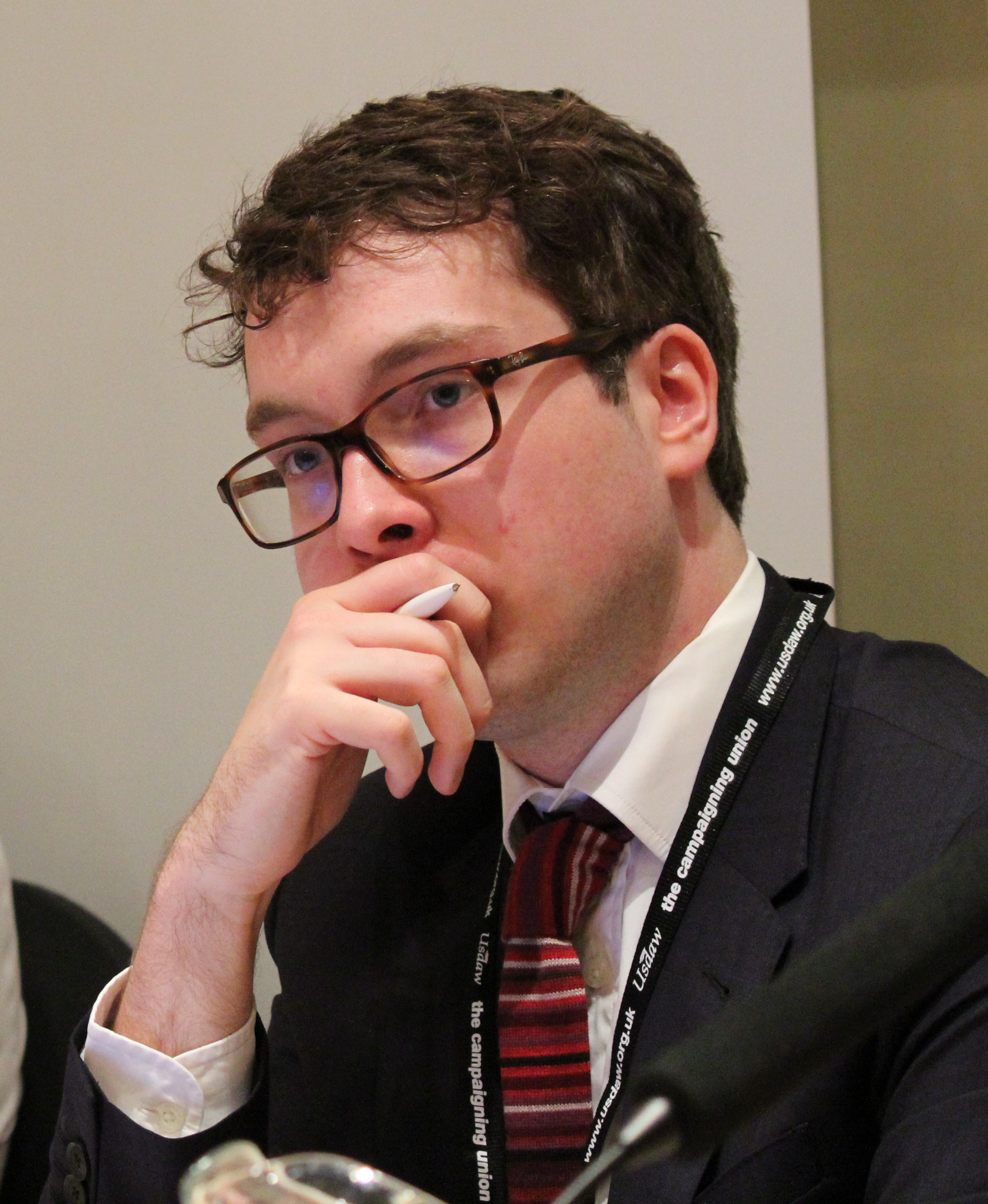
Sebastian Payne (born 1989), Think tank director of Onward and former journalist

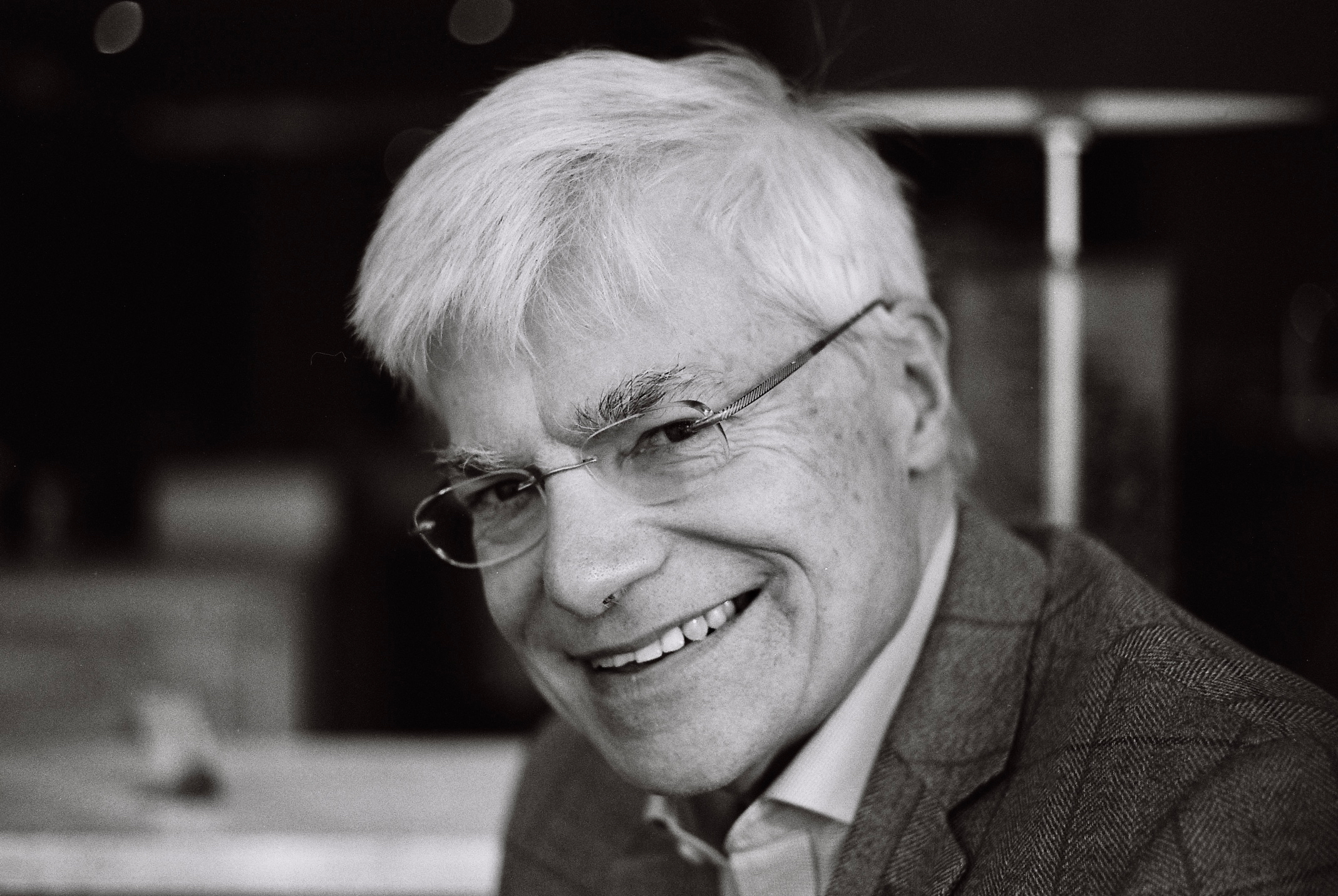
Ralph Allwood, MBE (born 1950), choral conductor, composer and Fellow Commoner advising in Music at Queens' College, Cambridge

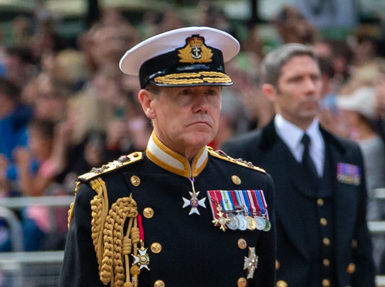
Vice-Admiral Tony Johnstone-Burt, KCVO, CB, OBE, DL (born 1958), current Master of the Household

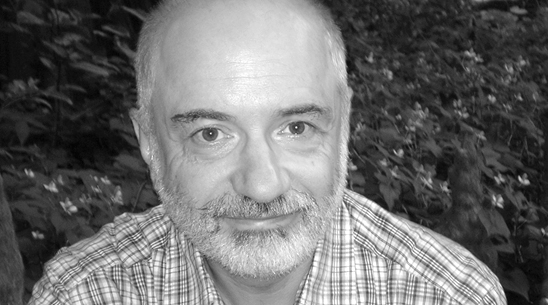
Mikhail Epstein (born 1950) Fellow. Literary scholar, essayist, and cultural theorist best known for Russian postmodernism

Name	Birth	Death	Career
Lord Hughes of Ombersley	1948		English judge of the UK Supreme Court; Previous Lord Justice of Appeal and Vice-President of the Criminal Division from 2009 to 2013.
Ralph Allwood	1950		British choral conductor, composer and teacher; Fellow Commoner advising in Music at Queens' College, Cambridge.
John D. Barrow	1952	2020	English cosmologist, theoretical physicist, and mathematician; previous Gresham Professor of Geometry at Gresham College from 2008 to 2011; 2006 Templeton Prize winner.
George Alagiah	1955	2023	British newsreader, journalist and television presenter, and one of BBC News's chief presenters.
Stuart Bain	1955		Archdeacon of Sunderland (2002–2018).
Julian Agyeman	1958		Professor of Urban and Environmental Policy and Planning, and Fletcher Professor of Rhetoric and Debate at Tufts University; Co-founder of Local Environment: The International Journal of Justice and Sustainability
Tony Johnstone-Burt	1958		Retired Royal Navy officer and current Master of the Household
Baroness Morgan of Huyton	1959		British Labour Party politician, and Master of Fitzwilliam College, Cambridge; Former Chair of Ofsted.
Sir Gareth Rhys Williams, 3rd Baronet	1961		British engineer, businessman and civil servant; current HMG Chief Commercial Officer in the Cabinet Office.
David Walton	1963	2006	British economist; member of the Bank of England's Monetary Policy Committee (2005–2006).
William Byng, 9th Earl of Strafford	1964		9th Earl of Strafford; previously Viscount Enfield (1984–2016).
Liz James	1964		British art historian of the Byzantine Empire; Professor of the History of Art at the University of Sussex; Fellow of the British Academy
John Maitland, Viscount Maitland	1965		Heir apparent to the Earldom of Lauderdale.
Jonathan Edwards	1966		Olympic, World, Commonwealth and European triple jump champion; held world record in the event since 1995.
Matt Field	1976		British Ambassador to the Czech Republic; British Ambassador to Bosnia and Herzegovina (2018–2022).
Jesse Honey	1977		English urban planner and quiz player; 2012 World Quizzing Champion.
John B	1977		English disc jockey and electronic music producer.
Rob Vickers	1981		Former rugby union player.
Naz Osmanoglu	1985		Anglo-Turkish comedian and member of the Imperial House of Osman, former ruling dynasty of the Ottoman Empire.
Christina Wolfe	1990		English actress.
George Bourne	1998		British rower.

=== Principals ===
A list of Van Mildert principals (formerly Masters of Van Mildert College) since the college foundation in 1965:

Master	Tenure
Arthur Prowse OBE, TD	1964–1972
Paul Kent	1972–1982
Arnold Bradshaw	1983–1988
Principal	Tenure
Judy Turner	1989–1999
Ian Taylor	1999–2000
George Patterson	2000–2004
Master	Tenure
Patrick O'Meara	2004–2011
Principal	Tenure
David Harper	2011–2021
Tom Mole	2021–present

== Coat of arms ==
Coat of arms of Van Mildert College, Durham
Notes The Coat of Arms of Van Mildert College was granted on 3 February 1966 by the Garter King of Arms, preserved in the College archives. The scythes and the red field are taken from Prince-Bishop William Van Mildert's episcopal arms; with the addition of the Cross of St Cuthbert, which is a common emblem of Durham City and the University. The college generally uses only the escutcheon (i.e. shield) of its arms for most unofficial purposes. The college motto is an anedoctal quotation from Virgil's epigram on emperor Augustus, translated as "Thus do ye, but not for yourselves" (alternatively, "For You, But Not Yours" or, "thus we labour but not for ourselves"). Adopted 1966 Crest On a wreath of the colours, In front of a castle of three towers sable, a silver pennannular brooch proper, the ends charged with gilded crosses of St. Cuthbert. Escutcheon Gules, two scythe blades in saltire, in chief the cross of St. Cuthbert argent. Motto Sic vos non vobis
