= Gilbert Ronald Bainbridge =

British physicist

G. R. Bainbridge
- Born: Gilbert Ronald Bainbridge; 28 November 1925; Felling, Gateshead, County Durham, England
- Died: 13 August 2003 (aged 77); Anglesey, Wales

Academic background
- Education: Durham University
- Thesis: The Emission of Ionizing Radiation during a Spark Discharge (1953)
- Doctoral advisor: W. A. Prowse

Gilbert Ronald Bainbridge FInstP (28 November 1925 – 13 August 2003) was a British physicist and engineer. After working for the United Kingdom Atomic Energy Authority, he became professor of energy studies and director of the Energy Centre at Newcastle University.

== Early life and education ==
Gilbert Ronald Bainbridge was born on 28 November 1925 in Felling, County Durham. He attended Jarrow County Secondary School before studying physics at Durham University, graduating with honours in 1946.

He remained at Durham for doctoral research under W. A. Prowse, receiving his PhD in 1953 for a thesis entitled The Emission of Ionizing Radiation during a Spark Discharge.

== Career ==
Bainbridge began his academic career as a lecturer at Paisley Technical College in 1951. In 1954, he moved to McMaster University in Hamilton, Ontario, Canada, where his research included the measurement of atomic masses using mass spectrometry.

In 1957, Bainbridge joined the United Kingdom Atomic Energy Authority (UKAEA) at Warrington as an assistant chief engineer. He subsequently worked on the development of nuclear reactors and associated research facilities. By 1974, he was manager of technical assessments in the UKAEA's Reactor Group.

In August 1974, Bainbridge left the UKAEA to take up the newly established chair of energy studies at Newcastle University.

== Selected publications ==
=== Books ===
- Duckworth, H. E.; Kerr, J. T.; Bainbridge, G. R. (1958). Nuclear Masses and Their Determination. London: Pergamon Press.
- Bainbridge, G. R. (1967). Nuclear fuel supply by the U.K.A.E.A. H.M. Stationery Office. ISBN 9780119802450.

=== Book chapters ===
- Bainbridge, G. R. (1981). "Comparative risks of different fuels in electricity generation". Environmental Impact of Nuclear Power. British Nuclear Energy Society. pp. 1–23. doi:10.1680/teionp.44333.0001. ISBN 9780727744333.

=== Journal articles ===
- Eastman, Philip C.; Isenor, Neil R.; Bainbridge, G. R.; Duckworth, Henry E. (1956). "Atomic Masses of Ni58 and Ni60". Physical Review. 103 (1): 145–146. doi:10.1103/PhysRev.103.145.
- Bainbridge, G. R.; Prowse, W. A. (1956). "The Absorption of Ultraviolet Ionizing Radiation in Gases". Canadian Journal of Physics. 34 (10): 1038–1045. doi:10.1139/p56-115.
- Prowse, W. A.; Bainbridge, G. R. (1957). "The Emission of Ionizing Radiation During a Spark Discharge". Canadian Journal of Physics. 35 (3): 324–331. doi:10.1139/p57-036.
- Bainbridge, G. R. (1974). "Nuclear Options". Nature. 249 (5459): 733–737. doi:10.1038/249733a0.
- ——— (1975). "Energy in the OECD". Nature. 254 (5502): 644–645. doi:10.1038/254644a0.
