= Dory Reeves =

New Zealand planning academic

Dory Elizabeth Reeves
- Born: 1957 (age 68–69)
- Education: University of Sheffield
- Scientific career
- Fields: Town planning
- Workplaces: University of Auckland
- Thesis: An examination of building for sale under licence as a low cost home ownership tool. (1990)

Dory Elizabeth Reeves (born 1957) is a New Zealand planning academic. As of 2018, she is a full professor at the University of Auckland.

== Academic career ==
After a 1990 PhD titled 'An examination of building for sale under licence as a low cost home ownerhsip [sic] tool.' at the University of Sheffield, Reeves worked in the public sector, higher education and private practice in the UK before moving to the University of Auckland in 2008, rising to full professor.

In 2017, Reeves was elected a Fellow of the Royal Town Planning Institute in the UK.

== Selected works ==
- Reeves, Dory. Planning for diversity: Policy and planning in a world of difference. Routledge, 2004.
- Buckingham, Susan, Dory Reeves, and Anna Batchelor. "Wasting women: The environmental justice of including women in municipal waste management." Local Environment 10, no. 4 (2005): 427-444.
- Reeves, Dory. "Mainstreaming gender equality: an examination of the gender sensitivity of strategic planning in Great Britain." Town Planning Review 73, no. 2 (2002): 197-214.
- Higgins, Marilyn, and Dory Reeves. "Creative thinking in planning: How do we climb outside the box?." Town Planning Review 77, no. 2 (2006): 221-244.
