= Center for Humans and Nature =

The Center for Humans and Nature is a nonprofit, non-partisan organization with a mission to explore and promote human responsibilities in relation to nature. The organization is headquartered in Libertyville, Illinois.

== History ==
The organization was founded in 2003 by Strachan Donnelley, Ph.D. a philosopher and ethicist who began his career at the Hastings Center.

Donnelley founded the Center to explore the role of ethical thinking—based in an environmental ethics—for informing individual and political decision-making.

== About the Center for Humans and Nature ==
The Center provides in-depth and diverse perspectives about what it means to be human in an interconnected world.

Contributors and Editorial Fellows for the Center's publications and projects have included philosophers, biologists, ecologists, lawyers, political scientists, anthropologists, artists, poets, and economists.”

The Center has co-hosted events with the Chicago Botanic Garden, Lincoln Park Zoo, Peggy Notebaert Nature Museum, School of the Art Institute of Chicago, American Museum of Natural History, Western Colorado University, Wisconsin Public Radio, Point Reyes Books, and New School at Commonweal. The Center has also partnered with the nationally syndicated public radio show To the Best of Our Knowledge on a podcast series. Event and podcast participants have included Robin Wall Kimmerer, David Abram, Jane Goodall, Kathleen Dean Moore, Sharon Blackie, Enrique Salmon, Suzanne Simard, Gary Paul Nabhan, and Julian Agyeman.

== Publications and media ==
The Center for Humans and Nature publishes stories and ideas online and in print that explore our relationships and responsibilities to nature and provide in-depth and diverse perspectives related to arts, humanity, and nature.

=== Stories & Ideas ===
The Center for Humans and Nature's online digital publications are housed under Stories & Ideas. These “Stories & Ideas” are featured in a diversity of forms—essays, art, interviews, poems, reviews, and videos—with a variety of contributors sharing their diverse perspectives on themes such as: Animals & Plants, Care, Climate Change, Community, Cosmos, Culture, Healing, Justice, Land & Water, Language, Practice, Reciprocity, Sacred, Sovereignty, and Urban Nature.

Contributors have included Rebecca Solnit, adrienne maree brown, Tommy Orange, Mary Midgley, David Sloan Wilson, Benjamin Barber, Robin Kimmerer, David Abram, Maude Barlow, Herman Daly, Bill McKibben, Sharon Olds, Nalini Nadkarni, Hans Joachim Schellnhuber, Vandana Shiva, and James Gustave Speth, among others.

=== Minding Nature ===
The Center publishes Minding Nature, formerly a tri-annual journal (2008–2021), and currently an annual journal that “explores ecological responsibilities, values, and practices.”

=== Center for Humans and Nature Press ===
The Center for Humans and Nature Press is the Center's independent publishing wing—exploring themes of human interconnection with nature and human responsibilities to the whole community of life. The Center for Humans and Nature Press print publications include the five-volume book series, Kinship: Belonging in a World Relations. Edited by Gavin Van Horn, Robin Wall Kimmerer, and John Hausdoerffer, Kinship is a five-book anthology that explores humanity's deep interconnections with the living world. The five Kinship volumes—Planet, Place, Partners, Persons, Practice—offer essays, interviews, poetry, and stories that highlight the interdependence that exists between humans and nonhuman beings. The Kinship book series is part of a larger project that also includes the Making Kin online art exhibition and the Kinship with the More-Than–Human World podcast in partnership with To the Best of Our Knowledge.
