= Sebastian Payne =

British journalist (born 1989)

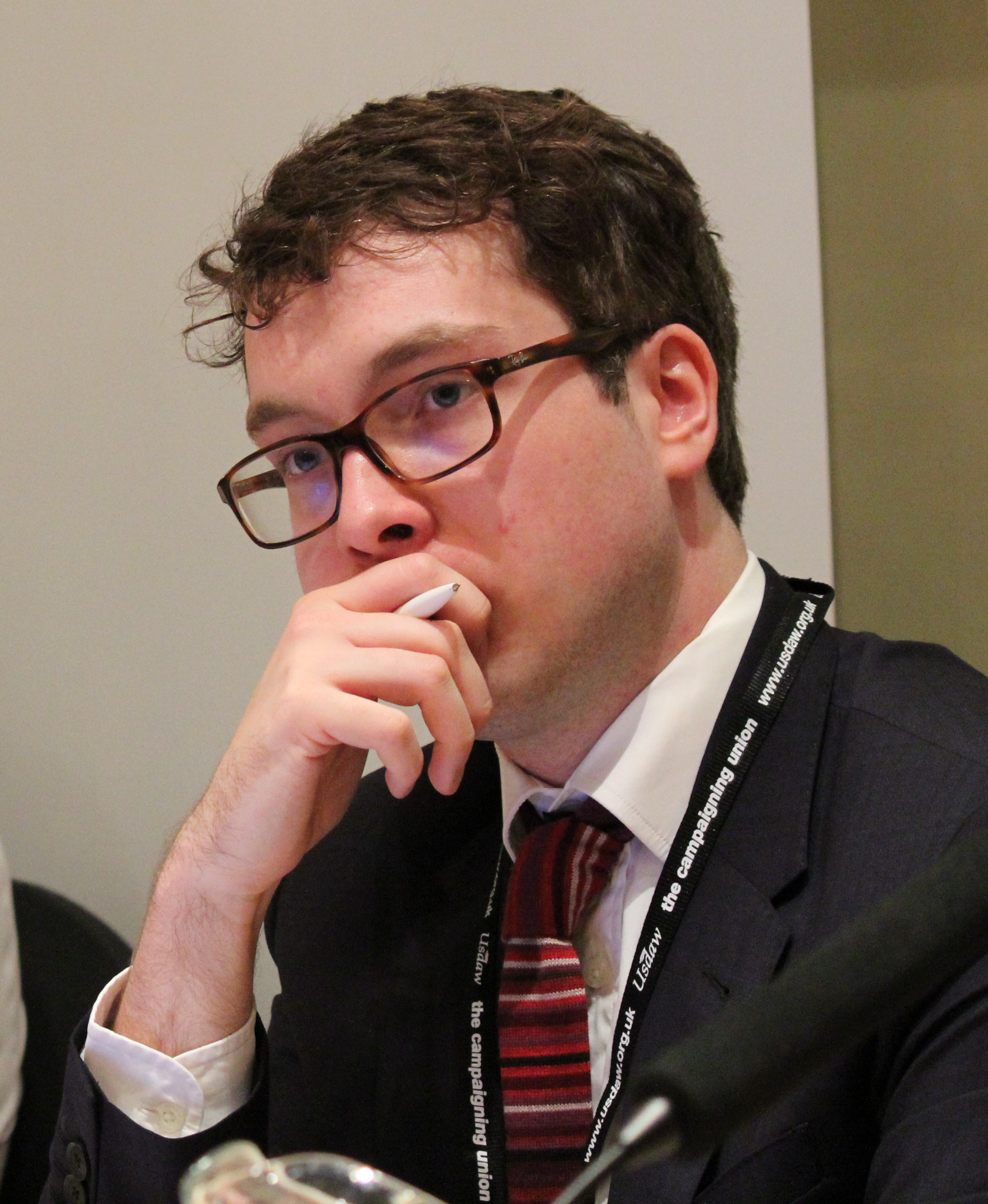
- Payne in 2013
- Born: 2 July 1989 (age 37); Gateshead, Tyne and Wear, England
- Education: St Thomas More Catholic School; Dame Allan's School
- Alma mater: Durham University (BSc); City, University of London (MA)
- Occupations: Journalist; Columnist
- Years active: 2011–present
- Employer: The Times
- Political party: Conservative
- Spouse(s): Sophia Gaston (m. 2019, divorced) Hannah Galley (m. 2026)

Sebastian Early Anthony Payne (born 2 July 1989) is a British journalist and former think tank director. He has formerly reported for The Daily Telegraph and The Spectator, before joining the Financial Times in 2016, where he become the paper's Whitehall correspondent. In 2022, he left the paper to become director of the think tank Onward. He left the think tank and joined The Times as a writer and columnist at the end of 2024.

== Early life ==
Payne was born on 2 July 1989, in Gateshead, England. He attended St Thomas More Catholic School, Blaydon, and later the private day school Dame Allan's School for sixth form, where he began studying politics. At Durham University, he studied computer science. He was media editor of the student newspaper Palatinate, and manager of Purple Radio, a student radio station where he also presented a show. During his tenure as manager, Purple Radio received a fine from PRS for Music for not paying any fees for playing music on the station for five years. He graduated from the university's Van Mildert College in 2010 with a Bachelor of Science.

After graduation, Payne completed an internship on the media desk of The Guardian. He obtained a Master of Arts in investigative journalism from City, University of London in 2011.

== Career ==
Payne volunteered for Conservative Campaign Headquarters during the 2010 general election campaign.

Payne became a data reporter at The Daily Telegraph in 2011, before leaving the paper the following year. He was an online editor of The Spectator magazine and the deputy editor of its Coffee House blog from 2012 to 2015. He was also managing editor of the magazine. During his time at The Spectator he spent nine months in a Laurence Stern fellowship at the national desk of The Washington Post.

Payne joined the Financial Times as digital opinion editor at the beginning of 2016. He became the paper's political leader writer, before being appointed Whitehall correspondent in March 2019. He wrote a fortnightly political opinion column and presented the weekly Payne's Politics podcast.

In 2021, Pan Macmillan published Payne's book, Broken Heartlands: A Journey Through Labour's Lost England, about the red wall areas that voted for the Conservative Party at the 2019 general election.

In November 2022, Pan Macmillan published The Fall of Boris Johnson, Payne's book about Prime Minister Boris Johnson's downfall.

In December 2022, Payne left the Financial Times to become director of the think tank Onward.

In 2023, Payne applied to be the Conservative prospective parliamentary candidate for the 2023 Selby and Ainsty by-election and was shortlisted but not selected. Later that year, he applied to be the party's candidate in West Suffolk for the 2024 general election, but was defeated by Nick Timothy. Payne unsuccessfully ran to be the Conservative candidate in several other seats, including Bromsgrove, Bridlington and the Wolds, Waveney Valley, and Surrey Heath. With the close of nominations for seats on 7 June, Payne failed to be selected for a seat at the 2024 general election.

== Personal life ==
He married foreign policy researcher Sophia Gaston on 20 July 2019. They later divorced. Payne announced his engagement to Conservative Party councillor and former special adviser Hannah Galley in October 2025. They married on 17 May 2026 at St George's, Bloomsbury.

== Bibliography ==
- Broken Heartlands: A Journey Through Labour's Lost England (Pan Macmillan, 2021) ISBN 978-1529067361
- The Fall of Boris Johnson (Pan Macmillan, 2022) ISBN 978-1035016648
