= St Thomas More Catholic School, Blaydon =

St Thomas More Catholic School
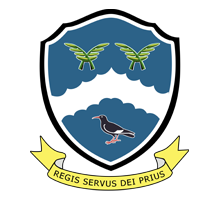

Location
- Croftdale Road; Blaydon-on-Tyne, Tyne and Wear, NE21 4BQ; England; 54°57′40″N 1°43′20″W

Information
- Type: Academy
- Motto: Regis Servus Dei Prius
- Religious affiliation: Roman Catholic
- Established: 1967
- Local authority: Gateshead
- Trust: Bishop Wilkinson Catholic Education Trust
- Department for Education URN: 137851 Tables
- Ofsted: Reports
- Chair: John Hayes
- Headteacher: Jillian Turner
- Staff: 145
- Gender: Coeducational
- Age: 11 to 19
- Enrolment: 1537 (2017/2018)
- Houses: St Bernadette, St Catherine Labouré, St John Fisher, St Theresa
- Colours: Royal Blue (Years 7 to 11) and Black (Sixth Form)
- Website: http://www.stthomasmore.org.uk

St Thomas More Catholic School is a Roman Catholic secondary school with academy status in Blaydon, Tyne and Wear, England, providing teaching to 11- to 19-year-olds.

== School organisation ==
The school became an academy in August 2012. A multi-academy trust (The St Thomas More Partnership of Schools) was set up in 2014 with local primary schools, Sacred Heart in Byermoor, and St Matthew's in Prudhoe.

The headteacher is Jillian Turner, who took over after Jonathon Parkinson OBE retired in 2022. The school's motto is "regis servus dei prius" which translates as, "I am the King's good servant, but God's first". This is a reference to St Thomas More, and his refusal to recognise Henry VIII as the Supreme Head of the Church following the King's split from the Vatican and Catholicism. The school uses the house system.

== Inspections ==
In its 2023 Ofsted inspection, the school was said to have a "climate of high ambition", and was rated as "good".

== Development ==
In October 2011, a new building phase was begun, to house new class rooms which replaced a temporary block. The new building was attached to the main part of the school from the ICT department to the English department, housing science labs and humanities classrooms. The building was completed for the beginning of the 2013/2014 academic year.

During 2015 the school began a construction project that included building a third floor on top of existing maths classrooms and science labs, as well as refurbishing both the interior and exterior of the maths classrooms and science labs and the interior of the textiles technology classrooms. The new floor meant that a larger maths classroom could be built, along with facilities for learning support and psychology as well as a new general classroom and a designated training room.

In April 2020 the previous St Thomas More Partnership of Schools multi-academy trust was dissolved so that St Thomas More could join and operate under the Bishop Wilkinson Catholic Education Trust.

In 2019 it was announced that St Thomas More was one of the 194 schools in the UK that would be permitted to deliver the new T-level qualification.

== Extracurricular ==
The school has music and drama departments, who run several groups and performances throughout the year. There are three main concerts each year, as well as a musical during the Spring term. The Chamber Choir performed at the Albert Hall in 2013.

|Year Production |

|1990 Oedipus Rex (non-musical)|

|1992 Grease|

|1996 Oklahoma!|

|1999 Oliver!|

|2010 Godspell|

|2011 Joseph and the Amazing Technicolor Dreamcoat |

|2012 We Will Rock You|

|2013 Grease|

|2014 Chicago|

|2015 Fame|

|2016 The Lion Kin|

|2017 Les Miserables|

|2018 High School Musical|

|2019 Oliver!|

|2020 Beauty and the Beast|

|2022 School of Rock|

|2023 The Addams Family|

|2024 Back to the 80’s|

|2025 Charlie and the Chocolate Factory|

|2026 We Will Rock You|

== Notable former pupils ==
- Steve Mould, TV scientist and science blogger who discovered the Mould effect.
- Graham Onions, England and Durham cricketer
- Sebastian Payne (born 1989), journalist

== See also ==
- St Thomas More Roman Catholic Academy, North Shields, similarly named school in North Shields.
