= Purple Radio =

Student radio station of Durham University

Coordinates: 54°46′24″N 1°34′18″W

Durham Radio

England
- Broadcast area: United Kingdom

Programming
- Language: English
- Format: Contemporary Hit Radio, News

Ownership
- Owner: Durham Students' Union

Links
- Website: www.purpleradio.co.uk

Purple Radio is Durham University's Official Student Radio Station. Purple broadcasts online 24 hours a day during term time, from October until June each year.

== History ==
=== Purple FM (1996 - 2005) ===
Purple Radio was previously known as Purple FM and later Purple 107. The station launched in 1996 and has been located variously within Dunelm House; in the College of St Hild and St Bede (1997–1999) and a small studio at Van Mildert College (1999–2002). Traditionally during this time the station aimed to run for two four-week RSL FM broadcasts per academic year. The station initially broadcast on frequencies around 105.4 FM, though later a frequency of 107 FM was retained. During the November 1999 broadcast pioneering use was made of outside broadcast equipment that utilised the University's internal telephone network to send transmissions from remote locations to the studio. During 2000 Purple FM was simulcast over the internet for the first time; however this service was only available from 7am to 11pm as the equipment required to run the service was sited in a student's bedroom.

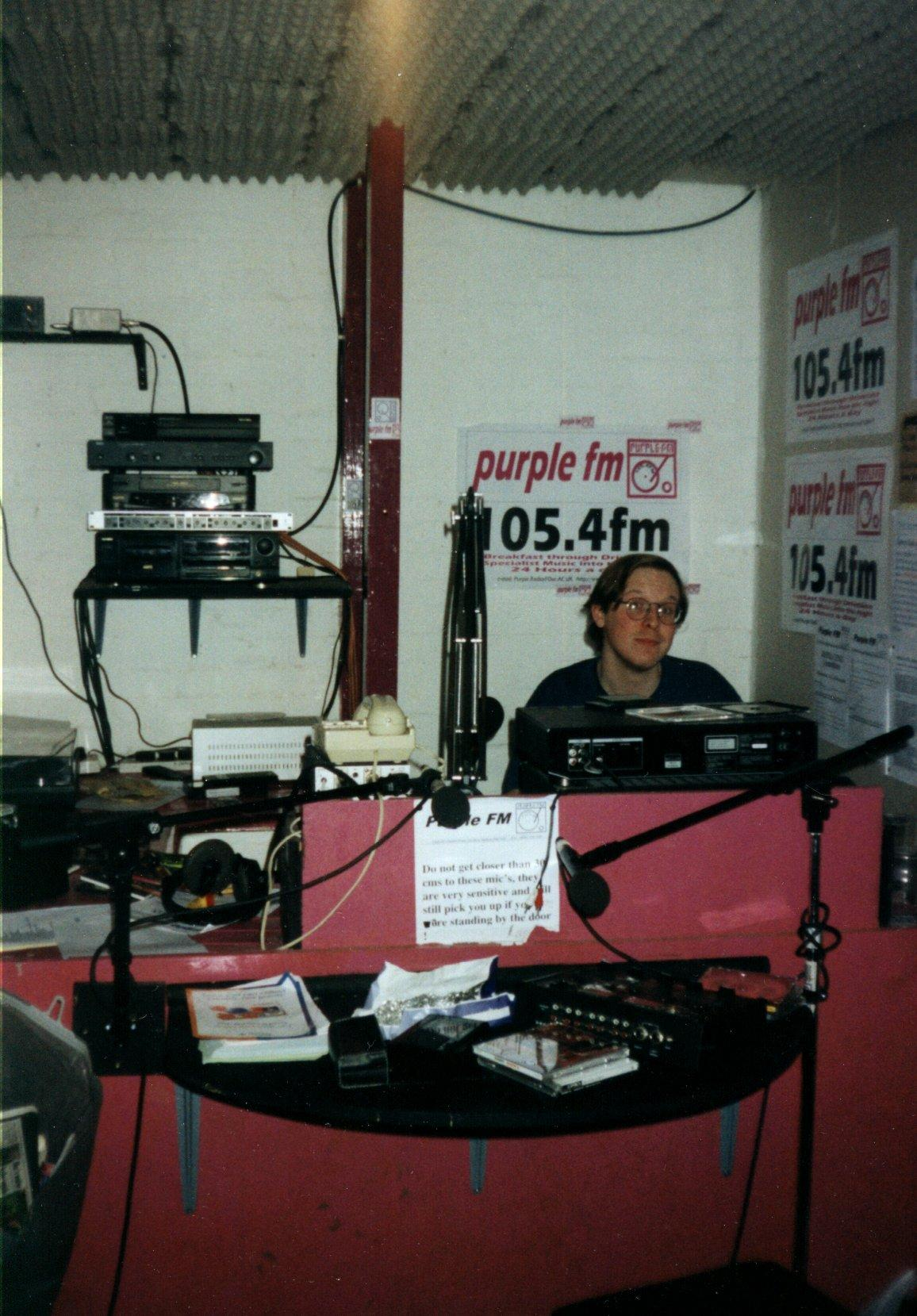
The Purple FM studio when it was based in Hild Bede in March 1998.

In the summer of 2002 the station moved into Dunelm House, the home of Durham Students Union. This move was made to the make the station more accessible and open to students from all parts of the university. The first broadcast to be made from the new studio was another four-week FM broadcast in October of that year on the same frequency as previous licences. A further such FM broadcast followed in November to December 2003. The move back to Dunelm house saw Purple Radio return to the exact same suite of rooms used by the station prior to its move to Hild Bede college in the 1990s.

=== Purple Radio (2005 - 2016) ===
Purple Radio Logo 2005–2016.

The station re-branded itself as Purple Radio in late 2004 in order to launch a 24-hour internet service via its website; this decision was taken due to the increasing popularity of the internet as a broadcast medium for student radio, the very high costs of broadcasting on FM, and the infeasibility of broadcasting on AM in Durham. In addition the award of a local FM licence to the new Durham FM that was preparing to launch in 2005 made it difficult for the station to successfully apply for RSL licences.

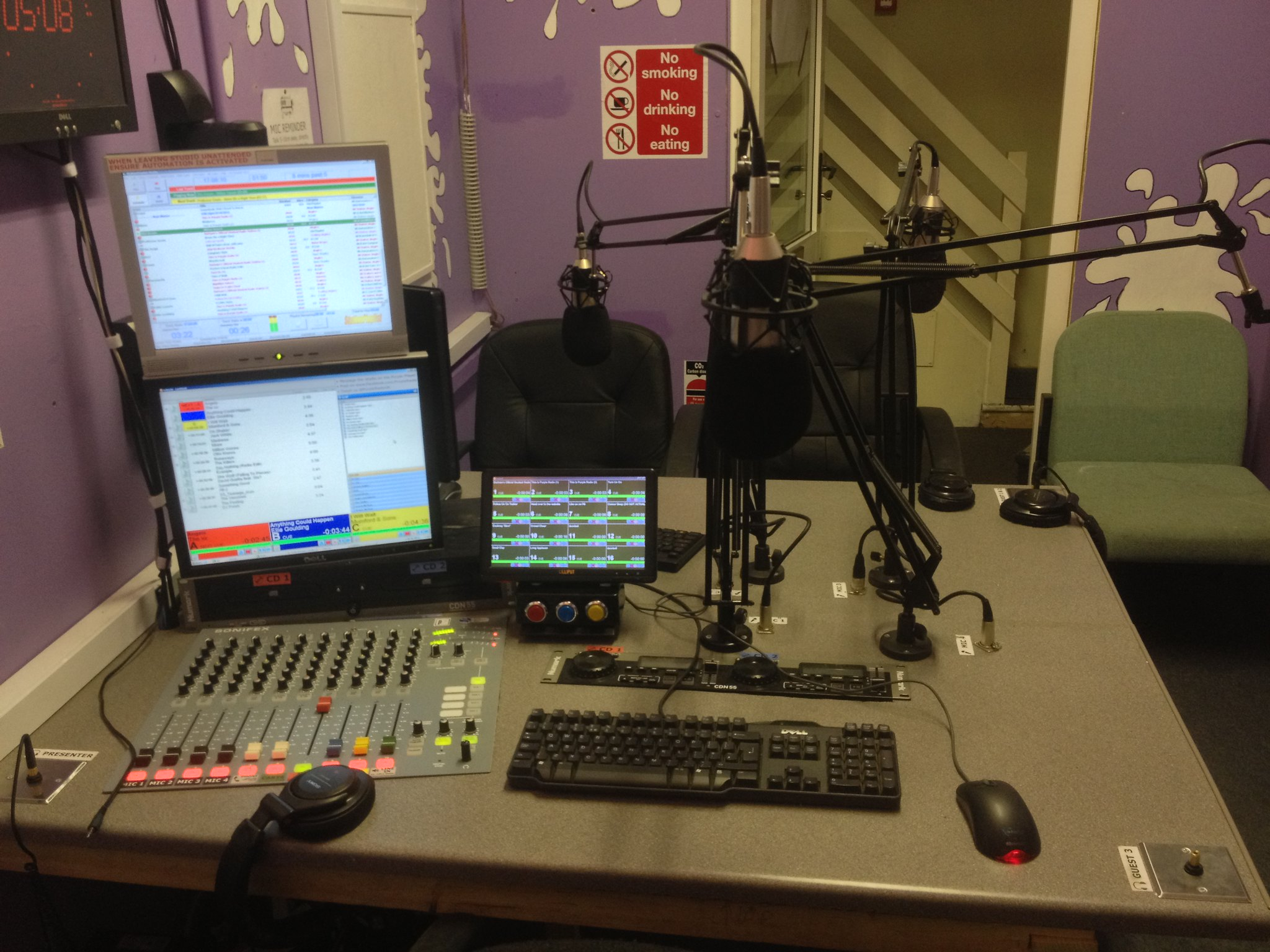
Purple Radio Studio in Dunelm House in 2012

The first internet-based broadcast began on the first day of Epiphany term 2005, but was forced off air in late February after heavy snow storms leaked into the studio and damaged much of the station's equipment. After a studio re-build and a change of executive, the station was re-launched a year later on 16 January 2006 and successfully completed its longest period of continuous broadcasting on Friday 23 June. Since this time, Purple Radio has been broadcasting 24 hours a day during term time, except in exceptional circumstances.

=== Rebrand (2016–present) ===
Beginning 3 October 2016, Purple Radio launched its complete overhaul to include a brand new logo, website, and the introduction of Purple Radio on Demand. Work began on 17 March with the design of the new logo completed by the end of May. The website was then designed over the Summer.

September 2016 marked the acquisition of additional space, allowing Purple Radio to expand its office and begin plans for a second permanent studio.

Its recent and continuing 'Videotape' series has interviewed notable figures, including Gabby Logan, Peter Hitchens, Dehenna Davison, Harold Ellis (surgeon), Owen Bennett-Jones and Tom Mustill.

== Awards ==
Purple Radio has been nominated and won various Student Radio Awards (SRA) and I Love Student Radio Awards.

Year	SRA Nominations	SRA Wins	I Love Student Radio Nominations	I Love Student Radio Wins
2007	Best Specialist Music Programming - Jacob Niedzwiecki	Best Specialist Music Programming - Jacob Niedzwiecki (Bronze)	-	-
2010	-	-	Outstanding Contribution to a Student Station - Amy Collins	Outstanding Contribution to a Student Station - Amy Collins
2013	Best Marketing and Sound	-	-	-
2014	Best Technical Achievement - Studio in a box; Best Marketing & Station Sound; Best Student Radio Station	Best Technical Achievement - Studio in a box (Silver); Best Marketing & Station Sound (Bronze)	Best Audience Initiative; Most Committed Committee Member - Rosie Kyrke-Smith; Most Improved Station	Best Audience Initiative; Most Committed Committee Member - Rosie Kyrke-Smith; Most Improved Station (Highly Commended)
2016	-	-	Best Audience Initiative	Best Audience Initiative (Highly Commended)
2017	Best Live Event or Outside Broadcast - Jam by the Lake 2017; Best Station Branding; Best Newcomer - Matthew Calvert	Best Newcomer - Matthew Calvert (Bronze)	Most Improved Station	-
2019	Best Journalistic Programming - Housing Crisis Investigation; Best Sport Programming - Sportsfeed	Best Journalistic Programming - Housing Crisis Investigation (Gold); Best Sport Programming - Sportsfeed (Silver)	Outstanding Contribution to a Student Radio Station - Jess Dunning; Student Radio Team of the Year - Sport Team	-
2020	Best Station Branding; Best Student Radio Station	Best Station Branding		

== Notable alumni ==
- Sebastian Payne, journalist
