= Gail Tipa =

New Zealand resource management planner

Gail Tipa ONZM
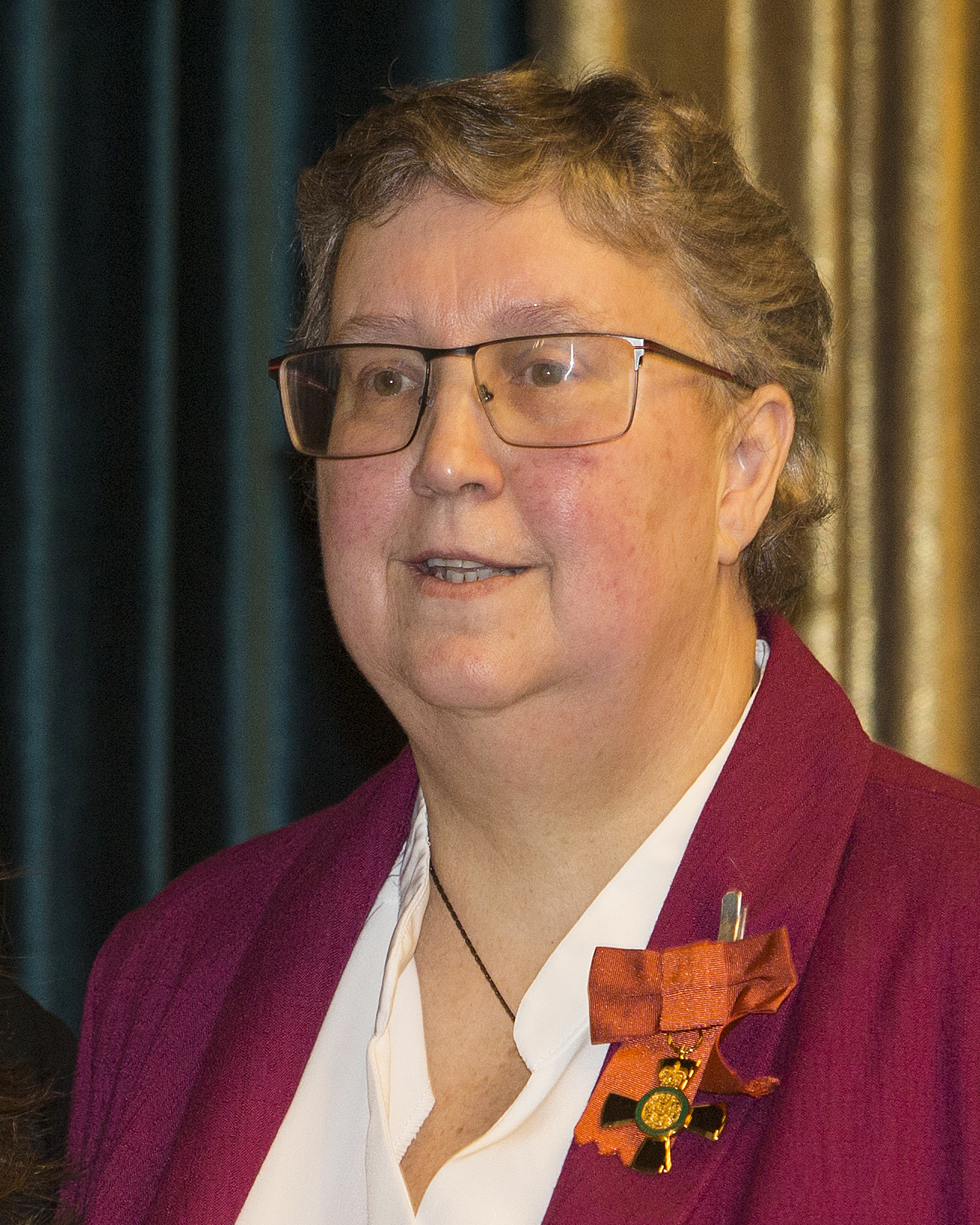
- Born: 1959
- Awards: Officer of the New Zealand Order of Merit

Academic background
- Education: University of Otago
- Thesis: Indigenous communities and the co-management of natural resources: the case of New Zealand freshwater management
- Doctoral advisor: Michelle Thompson-Fawcett, Richard Vane Welch

Gail Tewaru Tipa ONZM (born 1959) is a New Zealand resource management planner, and has worked in the environmental sector for thirty years. In 2021 Tipa was appointed an Officer of the New Zealand Order of Merit for services to Māori and environmental management.

== Career ==
Tipa is Māori, and affiliates to Kāi Tahu. Tipa has Bachelor of Arts, and a Master's degree in resource and regional planning. She completed a PhD titled Indigenous communities and the co-management of natural resources: the case of New Zealand freshwater management at the University of Otago in 2003. She trained as a teacher initially, and then worked for the Electricity Corporation of New Zealand, and then opened an environmental research and management consultancy. Tipa worked on the Kāi Tahu claim and settlement in the 1990s and has been involved in Kāi Tahu governance. Tipa is particularly concerned with freshwater and fisheries management. Tipa has developed new tools to improve the participation of Māori in freshwater management, including the Cultural Health Index and the Cultural Flow Assessment method.

Tipa is part of the Ngā Pae o Te Māramatanga Centre of Research Excellence, and was a member of the inaugural governance group of the New Zealand's Biological Heritage, Ngā Koiora Tuku Iho National Science Challenge. Her work with Ngā Pae was focused on researching the links between environmental integrity and health and wellbeing of Indigenous communities.

== Honours and awards ==
In the 2021 New Year Honours Tipa was appointed an Officer of the New Zealand Order of Merit for services to Māori and environmental management.

== Selected publications ==
- Ruth Panelli; Tipa, Gail (2008). "Beyond foodscapes: considering geographies of Indigenous well-being". Health & Place. 15 (2): 455–465. doi:10.1016/j.healthplace.2008.08.005. PMID 18948052. Wikidata Q37307124.
- Mae Noble; Phil Duncan; Darren Perry; Kerry Prosper; Denis Rose; Stephan Schnierer; Tipa, Gail; Erica Williams; Rene Woods; Pittock, Jamie (2016). "Culturally significant fisheries: keystones for management of freshwater social-ecological systems". Ecology and Society. 21 (2). doi:10.5751/es-08353-210222. Wikidata Q60512974.
- Stewart, Michael; Phillips, Ngaire R.; Greg Olsen; Hickey, Christopher Wayne; Tipa, Gail (2011). "Organochlorines and heavy metals in wild caught food as a potential human health risk to the indigenous Māori population of South Canterbury, New Zealand". Science of the Total Environment. 409 (11): 2029–2039. doi:10.1016/j.scitotenv.2011.02.028. PMID 21402398. Wikidata Q83607911.
- Tipa, Gail (2009). "Exploring Indigenous Understandings of River Dynamics and River Flows: A Case from New Zealand". Environmental Communication Yearbook. 3 (1): 95–120. doi:10.1080/17524030802707818. Wikidata Q125127384.
- Jim Sinner; Mark Newton; Barclay, Jaye; James Baines; Farrelly, Trisia Angela; Edwards, Peter; Tipa, Gail (2020). "Measuring social licence: What and who determines public acceptability of aquaculture in New Zealand?". Aquaculture. 521 734973. doi:10.1016/j.aquaculture.2020.734973. Wikidata Q124287739.
- Tipa, Gail; Kyle Nelson (2016). "Eco-cultural restoration across multiple spatial scales: a New Zealand case study". Water history. 9 (1): 87–106. doi:10.1007/s12685-016-0175-9. Wikidata Q113105673.
