= Van Mildert Boat Club =

British rowing club

- Motto: Latin: Sic vos non vobis
- Location: Durham, England
- Coordinates: 54.772658°N 1.573128°W
- Home water: River Wear
- Founded: 1965; 61 years ago
- Affiliations: British Rowing
- Website: vmbc.webspace.durham.ac.uk

Van Mildert Boat Club (VMBC) is the rowing club of Van Mildert College, Durham at Durham University on the River Wear in England.

VMBC was founded in 1965 by Simon Scott, an Engineering undergraduate at Durham University and one of the founding members of Van Mildert College.

VMBC is a registered Boat Club through British Rowing, with Boat Code "VAN" and is a member organisation of Durham College Rowing.

In Durham, the club is a regular participant at Durham Regatta, races across the north east, the Head of the River Race and the Women's Eights Head of the River Race in London and Durham College Rowing events.

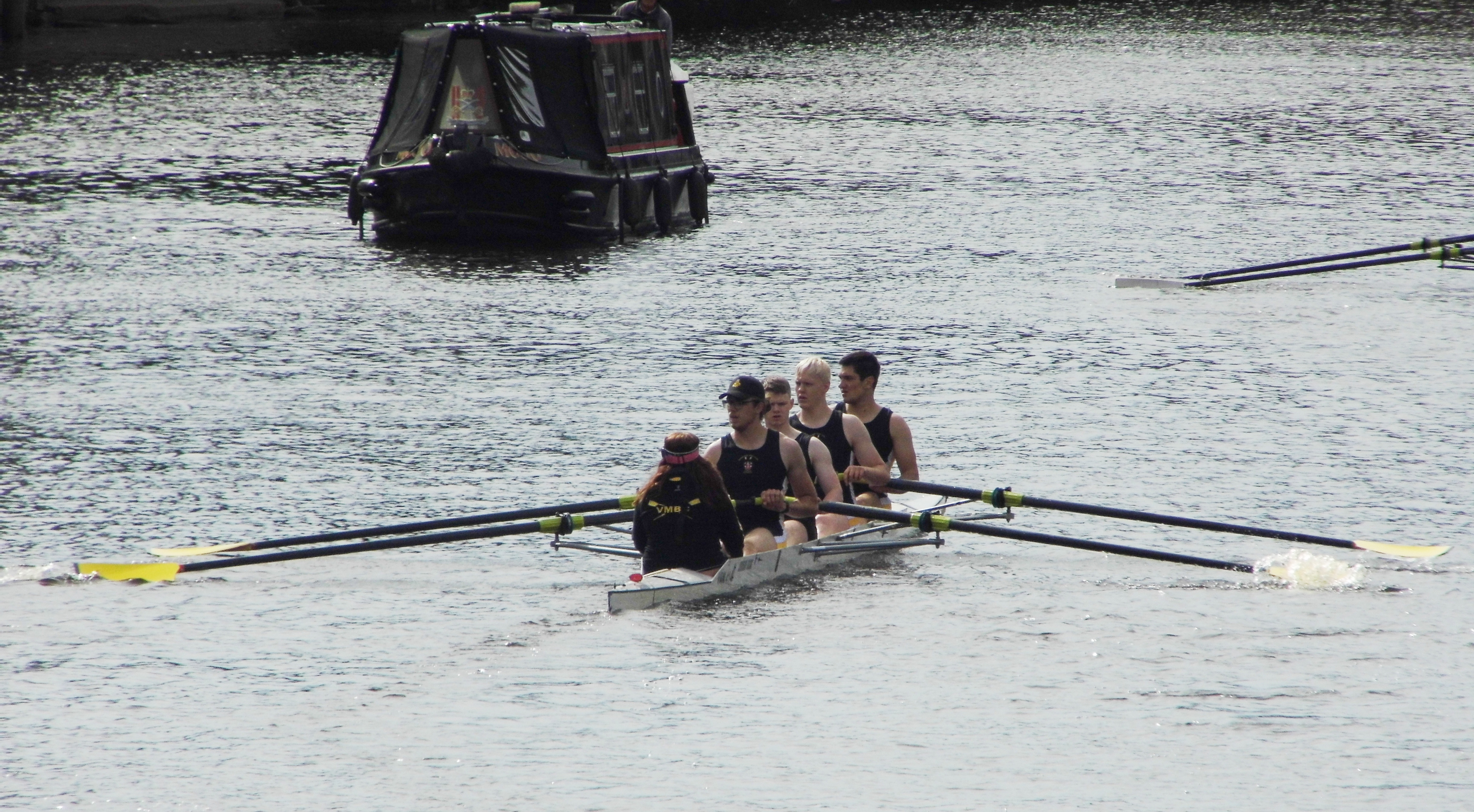
Van Mildert Boat Club at York Summer Regatta

The boathouse of the club is on the River Wear, opposite Dunelm House and below Kingsgate Bridge. The college boat house burnt down after an arsonist attacked it on 21 December 2021.

== See also ==
- University rowing (UK)
- List of rowing clubs on the River Wear
