= Home student (United Kingdom) =

In tertiary education in the United Kingdom, the term home student is used to refer to those who are eligible to pay university tuition fees at a lower rate than overseas students. In general, British, and Irish citizens qualify for home student status only if they have been "ordinarily resident" in the UK for three years prior to the start of university. From Autumn 2021, EU citizens lost their home student status and since have had to pay the higher international tuition fees. There are other criteria to be satisfied. All other students, even British citizens, who do not qualify as "home students" are considered to be overseas students and must pay higher overseas students tuition fees at university.

== Eligibility for home student status ==
=== United Kingdom students ===
On the first day of the first academic year of the course, to qualify as a home student, all of the following criteria must be fulfilled by the student:

- Be free from any immigration restrictions (e.g. British citizenship, exercising EU Freedom of Movement Rights, indefinite leave to enter/remain, right of abode, free from immigration control (as a diplomat or member of air crew))
- Be ordinarily resident in the United Kingdom
- Have been ordinarily resident in the United Kingdom, Channel Islands and/or Isle of Man for the whole period of the three years directly preceding the first day of the academic course
- The main purpose for the three years' residence in the UK and Islands must not have been to receive full-time education during any part of it, unless the student is a European Union citizen (but not a British citizen) and immediately prior to the three-year period was ordinarily resident in the European Economic Area, Switzerland or qualifying overseas territories (see below).

=== United Kingdom students having lived in Europe ===
On the first day of the first academic year of the course, to qualify as a home student, all of the following criteria must be fulfilled by the student:

- Be free from any immigration restrictions (e.g. British citizenship, exercising EU Freedom of Movement Rights, indefinite leave to enter/remain, right of abode, free from immigration control (as a diplomat or member of air crew))
- Be ordinarily resident in the United Kingdom for a whole period of three years directly preceding the first day of the academic course
- Having previous lived in the United Kingdom free from any immigration restrictions, the student later moved to the European Economic Area and/or Switzerland where he/she exercised his/her Freedom of Movement rights
- If the main purpose for the three years' residence in the European Economic Area and/or Switzerland was to receive full-time education during any part of it, the student must have already been ordinarily resident in the European Economic Area and/or Switzerland immediately before the three-year period.
- United Kingdom Nationals living abroad as expats can also qualify for home fees if they meet certain criteria on eligibility. These are mainly centered around Ordinary residence case law. Students with UK Nationality living as expats abroad should seek advice and research if they are able to meet these requirements.

=== Irish students ===
Due to Irish citizens being free from any immigration restrictions and entitled to access all levels of education in the UK on terms no less favourable than those available to the citizens of the UK under the Common Travel Area agreement Irish citizens are treated the same as British citizens for education purposes.

On the first day of the first academic year of the course, to qualify as a home student, both of the following criteria must be fulfilled by Irish students:

- Be ordinarily resident in the United Kingdom
- Have been ordinarily resident in the United Kingdom, Channel Islands and/or Isle of Man for the whole period of the three years directly preceding the first day of the academic course.

=== European Union students ===
Until the British withdrawal from the EU, the following were the conditions that citizens of the European Union had to satisfy in order to be considered a “home student”:

On the first day of the first academic year of the course, to qualify as a home student, all of the following criteria must be fulfilled by the student:

- Be a European Union citizen, or the spouse or dependent direct descendant of an EU citizen (including British citizen), or the dependent direct descendant of the spouse of an EU citizen (including British citizen), or the self-sufficient direct descendant of an EU citizen (who is not a British citizen), or the self-sufficient direct descendant of the spouse of an EU citizen (who is not a British citizen)
- Have been ordinarily resident in the European Economic Area, Switzerland and/or qualifying overseas territories for the whole period of the three years directly preceding the first day of the academic course
- The main purpose for the three years' residence in the European Economic Area, Switzerland and/or qualifying overseas territories must not have been to receive full-time education during any part of it.

=== European Economic Area and Swiss workers and their family members ===
On the first day of the first academic year of the course, to qualify as a home student, all of the following criteria must be fulfilled by the student:

- Be a European Economic Area or Swiss citizen (who is not a British citizen) who is resident in the United Kingdom as a worker (employed, self-employed or a frontier worker (living in the UK but returning to his/her residence in an EEA state/Switzerland other than the UK at least once a week)), or be the spouse or dependent direct descendant of such a person, or the self-sufficient direct descendant of such a person, or the dependent or self-sufficient direct descendant of such a person's spouse
- Be ordinarily resident in the United Kingdom
- Have been ordinarily resident in the European Economic Area, Switzerland and/or qualifying overseas territories for the whole period of the three years directly preceding the first day of the academic course

== Qualifying overseas territories ==
The following overseas territories are considered to be 'qualifying overseas territories' in terms of determining home student status:

- Anguilla
- Aruba
- Bermuda
- British Antarctic Territory
- British Indian Ocean Territory
- British Virgin Islands
- Cayman Islands
- Falkland Islands
- Faroe Islands
- French Polynesia
- French Southern and Antarctic Lands
- Greenland
- Montserrat
- New Caledonia
- Saint Pierre and Miquelon
- Turks and Caicos Islands
- Wallis and Futuna

== See also ==
- Universities in the United Kingdom
- UCAS
- Education in the United Kingdom
- St Anne's College, Oxford#Society of Oxford Home-Students (1879–1942)
