= Arthur Prowse =

British physicist and Academic administrator

Lieutenant Colonel William Arthur Prowse OBE TD (1907– 14 July 1981) was a British physicist and academic administrator. He was the founding Master of Van Mildert College, Durham.

Prowse matriculated at Hatfield College, Durham and graduated with a degree in Physics from Durham University in 1927. He completed his doctorate at the same institution in 1931 – this time, per the conditions of the Pemberton Studentship, as a member of University College. Except for a brief period of secondment under Willis Jackson at Imperial College, London from 1947 to 1948, he spent his entire academic career in Durham. He served as Vice-Master of University College from 1953 to 1965.

Active in the Officers' Training Corps, in 1966 he was awarded the O.B.E. He retired to Brancepeth in 1972.

Academic offices
Preceded by Office established	Master of Van Mildert College; 1965–1972	Succeeded by Paul Kent
