= Local Environment =

- Discipline: Urban studies
- Language: English
- Edited by: Julian Agyeman

Publication details
- History: 1996-present
- Publisher: Routledge
- Frequency: Monthly
- Impact factor: 1.928 (2017)

Standard abbreviations
- ISO 4: Local Environ.

Indexing
- ISSN: 1354-9839 (print); 1469-6711 (web)
- OCLC no.: 643039747

Links
- Journal homepage; Online archive

Local Environment: The International Journal of Justice and Sustainability is a peer-reviewed academic journal covering the fields of urban planning, environmental policy, and sustainable development with a focus on the intersection of social justice and sustainability in the local environment. The journal's audience and contributors include "researchers, activists, non-governmental organisations, students, teachers, policy makers and practitioners". It is published monthly by Routledge and was established in 1996. The editor-in-chief is Julian Agyeman of Tufts University. Associate editors are Stewart Barr of Exeter (UK), Michelle Thompson-Fawcett of Otago (NZ), and Robert Krueger of Worcester Polytechnic University (USA). According to the Journal Citation Reports, the journal has a 2017 impact factor of 1.928. It was ranked 13th among top urban studies and planning journals and 18th among sustainable development journals in 2018.
