= Michelle Thompson-Fawcett =

New Zealand geographer

- Education: University of Oxford
- Scientific career
- Fields: Human geography
- Workplaces: University of Otago
- Thesis: Envisioning urban villages : a critique of a movement and two urban transformations (1998)
- Doctoral students: Gail Tipa

Michelle Thompson-Fawcett is a New Zealand Māori academic of Ngati Whatua descent and is a full professor at the University of Otago. She is a Fellow of the Royal Society Te Apārangi.

== Academic career ==
After a 1998 PhD titled 'Envisioning urban villages : a critique of a movement and two urban transformations' at the University of Oxford, Thompson-Fawcett moved to the University of Otago, rising to full professor in 2017 and in 2022 was appointed distinguished professor at that university. Notable doctoral students of Thompson-Fawcett include Gail Tipa.

In March 2021, Thompson-Fawcett was made a Fellow of the Royal Society Te Apārangi, recognising her as a "world-leading expert in advancing contemporary mātauranga Māori and fostering Indigenous approaches to culturally sustainable environmental futures".

Thompson-Fawcett's book, Tāone Tupu Ora: Indigenous knowledge and sustainable urban design, published in 2010, was listed in Books of Mana as one of the 180 most significant works of Māori-authored non-fiction.

== Selected works ==
- Ancell, Sarah, and Michelle Thompson-Fawcett. "The social sustainability of medium density housing: A conceptual model and Christchurch case study." Housing Studies 23, no. 3 (2008): 423–442.
- Bond, Sophie, and Michelle Thompson-Fawcett. "Public participation and new urbanism: a conflicting agenda?." Planning Theory & Practice 8, no. 4 (2007): 449–472.
- Setiawan, Hery, Renaud Mathieu, and Michelle Thompson-Fawcett. "Assessing the applicability of the V–I–S model to map urban land use in the developing world: Case study of Yogyakarta, Indonesia." Computers, Environment and Urban Systems 30, no. 4 (2006): 503–522.
- Thompson-Fawcett, Michelle, and Sophie Bond. "Urbanist intentions for the built landscape: examples of concept and practice in England, Canada and New Zealand." Progress in Planning 60, no. 2 (2003): 147–234.
