= Julian Agyeman =

British professor (born 1958)

Julian Agyeman FRSA FRGS
- Born: November 20, 1958 (age 67); Beverley, England
- Occupations: Professor of Urban & Environmental Policy & Planning, Tufts University

Academic background
- Education: University of Durham (BSc); Middlesex University (MA); University of London (PhD)

Academic work
- Discipline: Urban planning; environmental social science
- Notable ideas: Just sustainabilities (social justice and environmental sustainability)
- Website: Official website

Julian K. Agyeman FRSA FRGS is a professor of Urban & Environmental Policy & Planning, Secondary Professor in Nutrition Science and Policy, and is Fletcher Professor of Rhetoric and Debate at Tufts University. He is a co-founder and the editor-in-chief of the journal Local Environment. During his career, Agyeman has developed the concept of just sustainabilities, defined as "the need to ensure a better quality of life for all, now, and into the future, in a just and equitable manner, whilst living within the limits of supporting ecosystems."

== Personal life and education ==
Agyeman was born on November 20, 1958, in Beverley, East Riding of Yorkshire, UK. He received a Bachelor of Science degree with joint honors in Geography and Botany from Durham University in 1980, a Post Graduate Certificate in Education from University of Newcastle-On-Tyne in 1982, a Master of Arts in Conservation Policy from Middlesex University in 1987, and a Doctor of Philosophy in Urban Studies from the University of London in 1996.

== Publications ==
Including his books and journal articles, Agyeman has over 175 publications in his field. His article, Mind the Gap: Why do people act environmentally and what are the barriers to pro-environmental behavior?, published in Environmental Education Research, is the most cited journal article by a North American urban planning scholar. His publications have led him to be ranked as one of the top 10 most highly cited urban planning faculty in North America. His work integrates multiple academic disciplines, including geography, sociology, urban planning and policy, environmental justice, and sustainability.

Books

- Introducing Just Sustainabilities: Policy, Planning and Practice (Bloomsbury Publishing, 2013)
  - An essential introduction to the concept of just sustainabilities, focused on solutions-oriented policies and initiatives addressing equity and justice while developing sustainable communities. Discusses key topics such as food justice, spatial justice, the democratization of our streets and public spaces, the just transition, and alternate economic models.
- Sustainable Communities and the Challenge of Environmental Justice (NYU Press, 2005)
  - Advocates and argues for the compatible goals between the environmental justice and sustainable communities movements. Offers examples of model organizations applying strategies from each movement.

Co-authored books

- Sharing Cities: A Case for Truly Smart and Sustainable Cities (MIT Press, 2015)

Co-edited books

- Nurturing Food Justice: Expansive and Intersectional Visions (MIT Press, 2026)
- Sacred Civics: Building Seven Generation Cities (Routledge, 2022)
- The Immigrant-Food Nexus: Borders, Labor, and Identity in North America (MIT Press, 2020)
- Food Trucks, Cultural Identity, and Social Justice: From Loncheras to Lobsta Love (MIT Press, 2017)
- Incomplete Streets: Processes, Practices, and Possibilities (Routledge, 2014)
- Cultivating Food Justice: Race, Class and Sustainability (MIT Press, 2011)
- Environmental Inequalities Beyond Borders: Local Perspectives on Global Injustices (MIT Press, 2011)
- Speaking for Ourselves: Environmental Justice in Canada (UBC Press, 2010)
- Environmental Justice and Sustainability in the Former Soviet Union (MIT Press, 2009)
- The New Countryside? Ethnicity, Nation and Exclusion in Contemporary Rural Britain (Policy Press, 2006)
- Just Sustainabilities: Development in an Unequal World (MIT Press, 2003)

Articles

- Kollmuss, A., & Agyeman, J. (2002). Mind the Gap: Why do people act environmentally and what are the barriers to pro-environmental behavior? Environmental Education Research, 8(3), 239–260. https://doi.org/10.1080/13504620220145401
- Julian Agyeman, David Schlosberg, Luke Craven, Caitlin Matthews. 2016. Trends and Directions in Environmental Justice: From Inequity to Everyday Life, Community, and Just Sustainabilities. Annual Review Environment and Resources. 41:321-340. https://doi.org/10.1146/annurev-environ-110615-090052
- Agyeman, J. and Evans, B. (2004), ‘Just sustainability’: the emerging discourse of environmental justice in Britain?. Geographical Journal, 170: 155-164. https://doi.org/10.1111/j.0016-7398.2004.00117.x
- Agyeman, J., Bullard, R. D., & Evans, B. (2002). Exploring the Nexus: Bringing Together Sustainability, Environmental Justice and Equity. Space and Polity, 6(1), 77–90. https://doi.org/10.1080/13562570220137907
- Agyeman, J, and Evans, T (2003) ‘Towards Just Sustainability in Urban Communities: Building Equity Rights with Sustainable Solutions.’ Annals of American Academy of Political and Social Science Vol. 590 pp 35-53. https://doi.org/10.1177/0002716203256565

== Career ==
In the early 2000s, Agyeman and colleagues developed the concept of just sustainabilities, exploring the intersecting goals of social justice and environmental sustainability. Just sustainabilities is defined as: "the need to ensure a better quality of life for all, now, and into the future, in a just and equitable manner, whilst living within the limits of supporting ecosystems.

In 2021 Agyeman was appointed to the Chair of the Fletcher Professor of Rhetoric and Debate, an endowed position at Tufts University. There are five Fletcher Professorships, established between 1925 and 1930 through the estate of Austin Barclay Fletcher, Tufts Alumnus (A.B., 1876).

In 2025 Agyeman was awarded the Tufts Distinguished Scholar Award by the Faculty Research Awards Committee.

=== Development of Just Sustainabilities ===
As a result of the 'equity deficit' which still pervades much 'green', 'climate' and 'environmental' sustainability theory, rhetoric and practice, Agyeman et al. (2002 p78) argued that "sustainability cannot be simply a 'green', or 'environmental' concern…". Integrating social needs and welfare offers a more 'just', rounded, equity-focused definition of sustainability, while not negating the very real environmental threats. A 'just' sustainability is therefore:

"The need to ensure a better quality of life for all, now and into the future, in a just and equitable manner, whilst living within the limits of supporting ecosystems."

Definitionally, he uses the term just sustainabilities because the singular form implies the existence of one single prescription for sustainability that can be universalized. The plural however acknowledges the pluriversality of just sustainabilities: its relative, place and culturally bound nature.

A just sustainabilities approach to policy, planning and practice brings together both an analysis and theory of change, with strategies to transform the way we treat each other, other species and the planet. The definition of just sustainabilities focuses equally on four essential conditions for just and sustainable communities of any scale. These conditions are:

1. Improving our quality of life and well-being;
2. Meeting the needs of both present and future generations (intra- and inter- generational equity);
3. Justice and equity in terms of recognition, procedure, outcome and reparation;
4. Living within earth-system and ecological limits.

Just sustainabilities is probably best understood as a bridging framework, rather than creating an entirely new social movement. It has reshaped how many planners, urban scholars, and sustainability practitioners think about the relationship between sustainability and justice. The concept has been received very positively in planning and urban studies, where it is often viewed as one of the major attempts to overcome the long-standing separation between environmental sustainability and social equity. As Castan Broto and Westmanon (2017) put it: "Just sustainabilities is not a ready-made recipe to deliver concrete initiatives, but a set of principles that should guide, rather than dictate, action. Just sustainabilities is a discourse of hope."

=== Editorships ===
- Co-founder (1996) and Editor-in-Chief of Local Environment: The International Journal of Justice and Sustainability
- Editor of the Routledge Equity, Justice and the Sustainable City Series
- Co-Editor of the Bristol University/Policy Press Series Smart Sharing Cities: Technology, Sustainability, Ethics and Politics
- Series Editor of Just Sustainabilities: Policy, Planning and Practice published by Bloomsbury Publishing

=== Awards and honours ===
He is a Fellow of the Royal Society of Arts (1996) and the Royal Geographical Society (2016). He received the Benton H. Box Award from Clemson University Institute for Parks in 2015 and the Athena City Accolade from the KTH Royal Institute of Technology in 2018. In 2023, he became Hedersdoktorer (Honorary Doctor) at KTH Royal institute of Technology, Stockholm, Sweden. In March 2025, he was awarded the Tufts Distinguished Scholar Award.

=== Visiting professorships ===
Agyeman has been a visiting professor at University of South Australia (2008–13), Northumbria University (2010-14), University of British Columbia (April–May 2011) and McGill University (2017-18); he also held the Walker Ames Visiting Professorship at the University of Washington (2017). He is currently the TD Walter Bean Visiting professor at the University of Waterloo, Canada (2020–21). He held a Visiting Fellowship at The Pacific Institute for Climate Solutions, hosted by the University of Victoria (2011). Agyeman was a Senior Scholar at the Center for Humans and Nature (2013–16) and a Fellow of the McConnell Foundation's Cities for People program in Montréal (2017).

=== Advisory positions ===
Agyeman currently sits on the Academic Board of The Centre for the Future of Places (KTH Royal Institute of Technology, Stockholm). He is also on the Advisory Boards of Shareable and Boston University Initiative on Cities. In November 2021, he was an advisor on Michelle Wu's Transition Committee for her transition into the office of mayor of Boston. Additionally, he is a Founding Senior Advisor/Thought Leader at PlacemakingX.
