= Tony Snell (RAF officer) =

British RAF pilot (1922–2013)

Anthony Noel Snell DSO
- Born: 19 March 1922; Tunbridge Wells, Kent, England, UK
- Died: 4 August 2013 (aged 91); British Virgin Islands
- Military career
- Allegiance: United Kingdom
- Branch: Royal Air Force
- Rank: Flight Lieutenant
- Nickname: Tony
- Service number: 119146
- Units: No. 242 Squadron RAF; No. 504 Squadron RAF
- Conflicts: World War II: North African Campaign; Allied invasion of Sicily
- Awards: Distinguished Service Order

Flight Lieutenant Anthony Noel Snell DSO (19 March 1922 – 4 August 2013), was a British RAF pilot during the Second World War. He flew in the North African campaign in 1942 and was shot down during the Allied invasion of Sicily in 1943. Initially captured by the Germans, he escaped from a firing squad but was later recaptured. He escaped captivity again while in Italy and became one of the very few men awarded the DSO solely for escaping from the enemy.

== Second World War ==
Snell was born in Tunbridge Wells, Kent, in 1922 and attended Cheltenham College. In November 1940 he volunteered for the RAF and was shipped to the United States for pilot training under the "Arnold" Scheme.

=== North Africa ===
Snell returned to Britain during the summer of 1942 and joined No. 242 Squadron RAF flying Spitfires. In October 1942 his unit was transferred to North Africa to provide air cover for the Operation Torch landings. For the rest of 1942 and into early 1943, Snell's squadron provided air interception and ground attack sorties in support of the British First Army as it drove towards Tunis.

=== Sicily ===
After the capitulation of Axis forces in May 1943, 242 Squadron was reassigned to Malta to refit for Operation Husky, the invasion of Sicily. On 10 July 1943, Snell was assigned to provide air cover over the Allied beachhead but was ambushed by German Messerschmitt Bf 109 fighters. His Spitfire was hit, and he crash-landed in enemy territory.

He initially encountered an Italian patrol, followed by a German one that opened fire on him. While attempting to escape from the Germans, he unknowingly took shelter in a minefield. After carefully making his way out, he was captured near an airfield by the Germans, who, suspecting him of being a spy, intended to execute him. Snell made another desperate escape, successfully fleeing once more but sustaining a wound to his right shoulder.

=== Escape from captivity ===
Weakened by his wound Snell was recaptured but this time was able to prove he was an Allied pilot. Treated for his wounds he was later transferred to a military hospital in Lucca. After Italy surrendered in September 1943 the Germany Army took control of the prison camp, and directed that the prisoners be transferred by train to Germany. While other prisoners on the train distracted the guards Snell, along with Major Per Lewis, escaped through a small window. The following morning they found they were near Mantua. After a six-day walk they encountered members of the Italian resistance movement near the small village of Fabrico, who helped them hide in a safe house in Modena for almost two months. With help from the resistance the pair gradually made it to the Swiss border, and they returned to Britain in November 1944. Lewis was mentioned in despatches on 1 January 1945, and Snell was awarded the Distinguished Service Order, a rare example of the award given for escaping from the enemy.

Snell spent time in hospital recuperating and later joined No. 504 Squadron RAF flying Gloster Meteor jet fighters. The squadron was assigned to Germany just after hostilities ceased and Snell remained August 1946 until discharged from the RAF a short while later.

== Post war ==
Snell travelled through Africa and met his future wife Jackie in New York in 1964. They travelled together in the United States and Mexico. He worked as an actor in films and theatre, and also as a songwriter and entertainer throughout his life. He recorded the album An Englishman Abroad whilst in New York. Returning to the UK in 1966, Snell and Jackie moved to Ibiza where they ran a charter service on a catamaran they had sailed there. In 1970 he moved to the British Virgin Islands to run an unsuccessful boat charter company.

His wife had opened a restaurant called The Last Resort which burnt down. Selling everything left in Ibiza the Snells rebuilt the restaurant into a success. Snell continued to provide entertainment to patrons up until his death.

He wrote an account of his life in Spitfire Troubadour.

== Distinguished Service Order citation ==
- 23 July 1946 – Flight Lieutenant Anthony Noel Snell (119146), Royal Air Force Volunteer Reserve
  On 10th July, 1943, this officer's aircraft was shot down during a patrol over the beach head in Sicily, where allied landings were taking place. He was then engaged in attacking a force of Messerschmidts. The crash landing took place in territory controlled by the enemy, but Flight Lieutenant Snell was able to evade capture and, after dark, endeavoured to return to the beach head. He first encountered a number of Italians whom he bluffed into thinking him a Vichy Frenchman. On escaping from the Italians, he eventually found a road which he recognised from his map. Whilst following this road he was challenged by some Germans who ordered him to put his hands up. Without warning they rolled a grenade at him along the ground. Just in time, he jumped aside and ran back, followed by more grenades; he escaped by taking cover in the scrub, shortly after this, he found himself in a minefield through which he picked his way for half an hour before reaching a track. Following this track, Flight Lieutenant Snell blundered on a German airfield, very near the battle area, where he was captured. The Germans decided to execute him as a spy. Flight Lieutenant Snell was marched out to a small open space and ordered to kneel down. Realising that he was to be shot in cold blood, he did not obey the order, but sprang away as the Germans fired. He was wounded in several places, his right shoulder being smashed. Despite this, Flight Lieutenant Snell evaded his captors, and hid for a time amongst boulders, before making a last attempt to reach the British lines. Owing to the extreme weakness and pain caused by his wounds, this attempt was not successful. Flight Lieutenant Snell was re-captured at dawn after he had collapsed from exhaustion. He was again threatened with execution for spying on the airfield, but finally managed to prove his identity to the satisfaction of the Germans. He was taken to a field hospital where his wounds received attention. Later, Flight Lieutenant Snell was transferred to Catania and thence to Lucca by sea. Here he was in hospital for about 2 months, until the Germans, who controlled the prisoners, decided to move them by train to Germany. Although not fully recovered from his wounds, Flight Lieutenant Snell determined to escape during the journey and made all possible preparations for this. In company with an American officer, he jumped from the train while it was passing through a junction, afterwards discovered to be Mantua. For the next week, they travelled south. During this journey, they had several narrow escapes from the Germans and were assisted by a number of Anti-Fascist Italians. With this help, the officers were able to reach Modena where they were sheltered by various friendly Italians for several months. It was eventually decided that Flight Lieutenant Snell and his companion should attempt to escape over the Alps to Switzerland. They made a long and risky train journey, accompanied by several of their Italian friends, to a small village near the frontier. There they were introduced to two guides who took them over the mountains. After a very long and steep climb, the frontier was reached and crossed. In Switzerland, Flight Lieutenant Snell was interned until October, 1944, when, the American advance reached the Swiss border.
