= Peter Lewis (British Army officer) =

- Born: 11 August 1918
- Died: 12 December 2008 (aged 90)
- Military career
- Allegiance: United Kingdom
- Branch: British Army
- Service years: 1937–1946
- Rank: Major
- Units: London Regiment; Queen's Royal Regiment; Durham Light Infantry
- Conflicts: Second World War: Second Battle of El Alamein; Allied invasion of Sicily
- Awards: Military Cross; Mentioned in Despatches

Major Peter John Lewis MC (11 August 1918 – 12 December 2008) was a British soldier, journalist and author awarded the Military Cross for his actions during the Second World War.

== Early life ==
Lewis was born in Leicester and educated at Lindisfarne College, leaving in 1935 to become a sub-editor at Everybody's Magazine.

== Military career ==
Lewis joined the Artists Rifles as a private in 1937 and was then commissioned into the 6th Battalion, Queen's Royal Regiment as a second lieutenant on 19 June 1940. Following the outbreak of war, the regiment went to France in 1940 as part of the British Expeditionary Force.

=== North African Campaign ===
Attached to 8th Battalion, the Durham Light Infantry in North Africa in May 1942, in June a patrol containing Lewis encountered a line of enemy positions. A small reconnaissance force was repelled, but the patrol leader, Captain Ian English, managed to contact his superior, Major Clarke, and inform him of the situation. Clarke decided to send in a force of armoured cars filled with soldiers from the Durham Light Infantry (commanded by Peter Lewis) at 9:15am, with machine gun, mortar and artillery units to support the attack (from 2nd Battalion Cheshire Regiment and 74 Field Regiment Royal Artillery) with a barrage starting at 9:14 and finishing at 9:16. The artillery assault started a minute late, and Lewis misinterpreted Clarke's orders to halt as an order to attack immediately. The force charged towards the Italian lines while dodging their own shells, and after Lewis's armoured car ran over the only operational Italian anti-tank gun the enemy force surrendered; 20 officers and 210 other soldiers in total, along with a large quantity of machine guns, anti-tank guns and other equipment; the British lost one man in the attack. Lewis received an immediate award of the Military Cross, gazetted on 24 September 1942, while his sergeant who had killed the anti-tank gunners was awarded the Distinguished Conduct Medal.

In 1942 he commanded a company in Operation Supercharge during the Second Battle of El Alamein; he was injured in combat, and the only officer from his unit to survive. He was again wounded in March 1943 when, on the Mareth Line, an officer nearby stepped on a mine.

=== Capture and escape from captivity ===
Following the Allied invasion of Sicily, Lewis was again injured in fighting at Catania and was captured by the Italian Army and sent to a Prisoner of War camp at Lucca. After Italy agreed peace terms in September 1943, the German Army took control of the prison camp and directed that the prisoners be transferred by train to Germany. While other prisoners on the train distracted the guards, Lewis, along with Flight Lieutenant Tony Snell, escaped through a small window. The following morning they found they were near Mantua. After a six-day walk they encountered members of the Italian resistance movement near the small village of Fabrico, who helped them hide in a safe house in Modena for almost two months. Among those members there were Don Mario Rocchi and Don Elio Monari, who had saved many British lives. With help from the Resistance, the pair gradually made it to the Swiss border, and from there they returned to England in November 1944. Lewis was Mentioned in Despatches on 1 January 1945, and Snell was awarded the Distinguished Service Order.

== Later life ==
Lewis retired in 1946 with the rank of acting Major and returned to his job at Everybody's, and worked as a motor racing correspondent for The Observer between 1954 and 1960. In 1949, he published his first book, co-authored with Major I R English MC, the original full title of which was 8th Battalion The Durham Light Infantry 1939–45 A History Compiled by Major P J Lewis MC, assisted by Major I R English MC from official records and personal accounts contributed by members of the Battalion.(J & P Bealls Ltd, Newcastle upon Tyne, 1949). The book has since been reprinted several times with the new title Into Battle with the Durhams. Later books include: Alf Francis, Racing Mechanic in 1957, Dicing with Death in 1961, Motor Racing through the Fifties in 1992 and The Price of Freedom in 2001.

In 1953 Lewis, with other of the British Officers whose lives were saved by Don Mario Rocchi, gave a significant support to the expansion of “Città dei Ragazzi” (Boys’ Town) in Modena, that was founded by Don Rocchi to help and to train children of poor families. In 1956 Lewis introduced the Charity International Help for Children (IHC) to Don Mario Rocchi to organize summer holidays of his Italian children to live in English foster families.

He died on 12 December 2008.
