= Adam Wakenshaw =

Recipient of the Victoria Cross

Adam Herbert Wakenshaw
- Born: 9 June 1914; Newcastle upon Tyne, Tyneside
- Died: 27 June 1942 (aged 28); Mersa Matruh, Egypt
- Burial place: El Alamein War Cemetery, Egypt
- Military career
- Allegiance: United Kingdom
- Branch: British Army
- Service years: 1939–1942
- Rank: Private
- Units: Durham Light Infantry
- Conflicts: World War II: North African Campaign; Western Desert Campaign; Battle of Mersa Matruh †
- Awards: Victoria Cross

Adam Herbert Wakenshaw VC (9 June 1914 – 27 June 1942) was an English recipient of the Victoria Cross, the highest and most prestigious award for gallantry in the face of the enemy that can be awarded to British and Commonwealth forces.

== Details ==
Wakenshaw was 28 years old, and a private in the 9th Battalion, The Durham Light Infantry, British Army during the Second World War, and was awarded a Victoria Cross for his actions on 27 June 1942 in Mersa Matruh, Egypt, where he was killed in combat.

=== Citation ===
On the 27th June, 1942, south of Mersa Matruh, Private Wakenshaw was a member of the crew of a 2-pounder anti-tank gun. An enemy tracked vehicle towing a light gun came within short range. The gun crew opened fire and succeeded in immobilising the enemy vehicle. Another mobile gun came into action, killed or seriously wounded the crew manning the 2-pounder, including Private Wakenshaw, and silenced the 2-pounder. Under intense fire, Private Wakenshaw crawled back to his gun. Although his left arm was blown off, he loaded the gun with one arm and fired five more rounds, setting the tractor on fire and damaging the light gun. A direct hit on the ammunition finally killed him and destroyed the gun. This act of conspicuous gallantry prevented the enemy from using their light gun on the infantry Company which was only 200 yards away. It was through the self sacrifice and courageous devotion to duty of this infantry anti-tank gunner that the Company was enabled to withdraw and to embus in safety.

— The London Gazette, 8 September 1942

== The Medal ==
His Victoria Cross medal is displayed at the Durham Light Infantry Museum & Durham Art Gallery, Durham City, England. His widow and son received the medal from King George VI at Buckingham Palace on 4 March 1943

== The 2-pounder gun ==
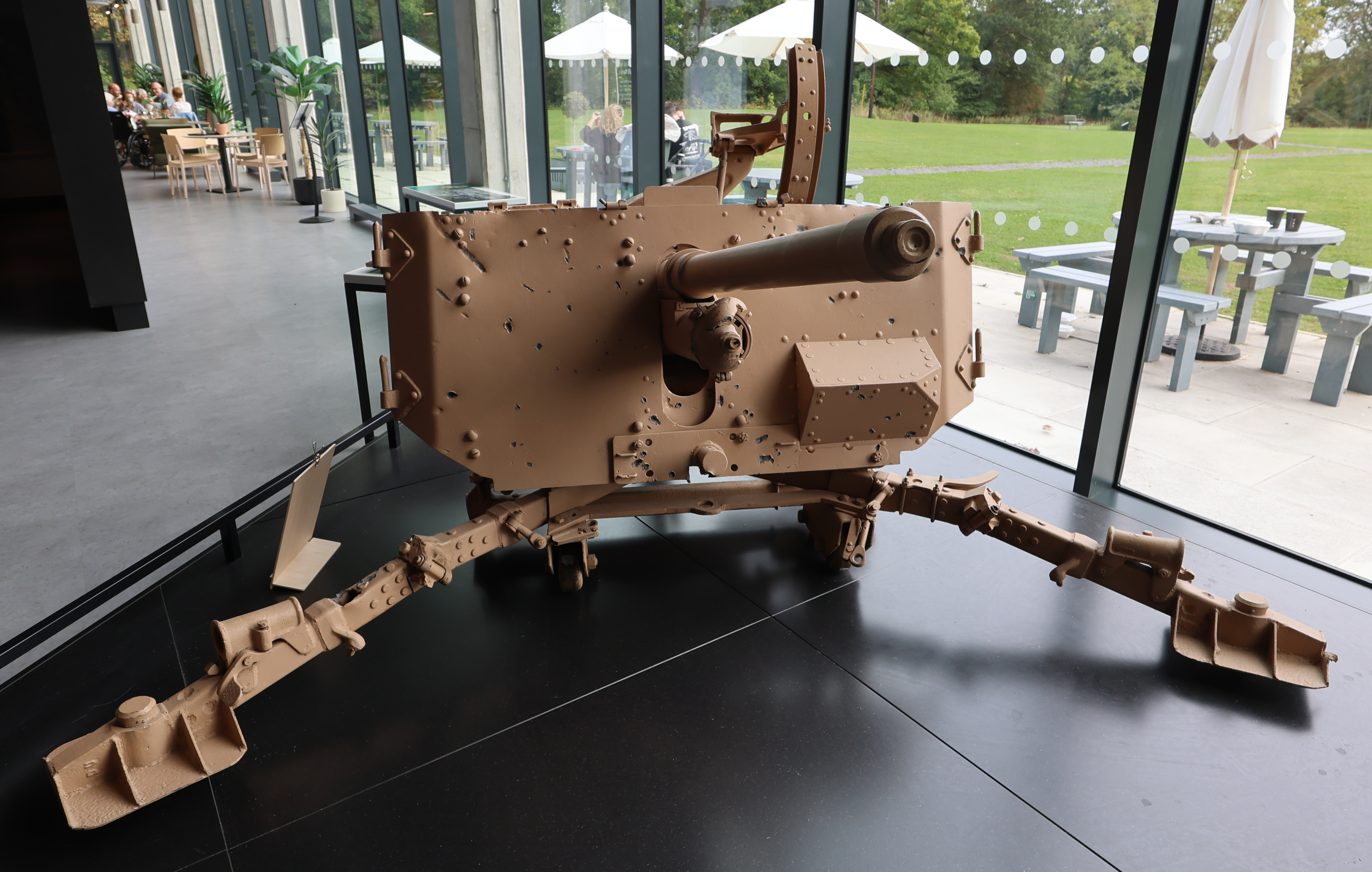
The 2-pounder gun Wakenshaw was firing

The Ordnance QF 2-pounder that Wakenshaw has been firing had initially been placed atop his grave. It was later relocated to Brancepeth Castle and is now in the Durham Light Infantry collection. In 2024 it went on display at The Story museum in Durham.

== Bibliography ==
- John, Laffin (1997). British VCs of World War 2: A Study in Heroism. Sutton Publishing. ISBN 0-7509-1026-7.
- Whitworth, Alan (2015). VCs of the North: Cumbria, Durham & Northumberland. Pen and Sword Books. ISBN 978-1473848221.
