= The Light, Durham =

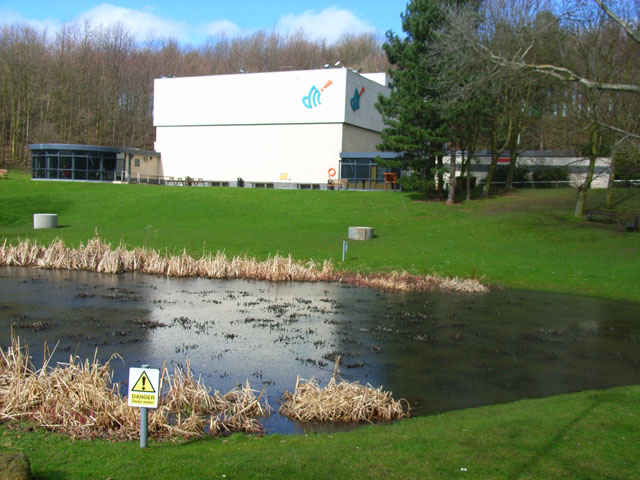
- The building in April 2006

General information
- Architectural style: Modern style
- Location: Aykley Heads in Durham, England
- Coordinates: 54.7844°N 1.5811°W
- Inaugurated: 1969

The Light, formerly known as the DLI Museum, is a cultural venue at Aykley Heads in Durham, England.

== History ==
The building was originally commissioned as a regimental museum for the Durham Light Infantry. The site selected was in a large rural setting known as Aykley Heads just to the southeast of County Hall. The building was designed in the modern style, built in concrete and glass and was officially opened by the Minister for the Arts, Jennie Lee, in 1969. The design involved a rectangular three-storey main block with a single-storey semi-circular section which projected forward at the southwest corner. The museum was located on the first two floors, with the Durham Art Gallery located on the third floor. It was refurbished to a design by Gareth Hoskins Architects, with interpretative displays about army life, in 1999.

In October 2015 Durham County Council announced the closure of the D.L.I. Museum as a cost saving exercise; it closed the following year. This decision sparked the formation of a campaign to see the museum saved led by John Richardson. In 2017, Durham University, in partnership with Durham County Council, opened a new D.L.I. Collection Gallery at the Palace Green Library on Palace Green in Durham (where the Regiment's final parade had taken place in 1968). In June 2019 Durham County Council revealed plans to move the Durham Light Infantry Collection to Mount Oswald, where a new history centre, named "The Story", opened in June 2024; it houses the DLI Archive and "the entire DLI Collection", but only a fraction is on public display.

Notwithstanding these developments, in 2021 the County Council agreed "to review options to reopen and repurpose" the old building at Aykley Heads. During 2025 and the first half of 2026, an extension was built which almost doubled the size of the old building. Following completion of the works, the venue opened on 22 August 2026. Renamed "The Light", it includes a dedicated DLI Gallery alongside other galleries and event facilities.
