= Abdy Ricketts =

British Army officer (1905–1993)

Major-General Abdy Ricketts CBE DSO
- Born: 8 December 1905
- Died: 16 January 1993 (aged 87)
- Military career
- Allegiance: United Kingdom
- Branch: British Army
- Service years: 1925–1957
- Rank: Major-General
- Commands: Cyprus District (1955–1956); 29th Infantry Brigade (1951–1952); 4th (West Africa) Infantry Brigade (1944–1945)
- Conflicts: Afridi Redshirt Rebellion; Second World War; Malayan Emergency; Korean War; Cyprus Emergency
- Awards: Commander of the Order of the British Empire; Distinguished Service Order; Mentioned in Despatches; Officer of the Legion of Merit (United States)

Major-General Abdy Henry Gough Ricketts, CBE, DSO (8 December 1905 – 16 January 1993) was a British Army officer who served as general officer commanding, Cyprus District during the Cyprus Emergency.

== Military career ==
Ricketts was commissioned in to the Durham Light Infantry in 1925. He served in the Second World War as second-in-command of the 3rd (West African) Infantry Brigade from March 1944 and then as commander of the 4th (West Africa) Infantry Brigade from October that year. After the war he served as a staff officer with responsibility for operations and staff duties in Malaya during the Malayan Emergency and then became commander of the 29th Infantry Brigade in October 1951 during the Korean War. He went on to be assistant commandant of the School of Land/Air Warfare in February 1953 and general officer commanding, Cyprus District in March 1955 during the Cyprus Emergency before retiring in 1957.
