= South Street =

South Street may refer to:

== Streets by that name ==
- South Street (Durham), England
- South Street, Mayfair, England
- South Street (Manhattan), United States
- South Street (Perth, Western Australia)
- South Street (Perth, Scotland)
- South Street (Philadelphia), United States
- South Street, Dorking, England
- South Street, Staines-upon-Thames, England
- South Street, Romford, England

== Other places, on or associated with streets of that name ==
- South Street (MBTA station) in Boston, Massachusetts
- South Street Seaport, a shopping complex overlooking the East River in Manhattan Island
- South Street Headhouse District, a neighborhood and commercial area in Philadelphia

== Villages and hamlets ==
- South Street, Bromley, England, a hamlet
- South Street, East Sussex, England, a hamlet in Chailey parish

== Other ==
- Royal South Street Eisteddfod, recent festivals in Ballarat, Australia
  - South Street Society, an earlier annual music competition
- "South Street" (song), a 1963 hit single by The Orlons
