= Kevin Pugh (footballer) =

English footballer

Personal information
- Full name: Kevin John Pugh
- Date of birth: 11 October 1960 (age 66)
- Place of birth: Corbridge, England
- Position: Midfielder

Youth career
- 1976–1978: Newcastle United

Senior career*
Years	Team	Apps	(Gls)
1978–1982	Newcastle United	1	(0)
1982–1983	Gateshead (Note: Alliance Premier League appearances only)	6	(0)
1983	Darlington	2	(0)
1983–1984	Gateshead	30	(5)
1984–1992	Charleroi (Note: The Belgian Soccer Database source has no appearance figures for the 1984–85 Belgian Second Division.)	175	(8)
1992–1996	La Louvière	66	(11)
1996–1997	Francs Borains		
1997–1999	Sambreville	47	(1)
- * Club domestic league appearances and goals

Kevin John Pugh (born 11 October 1960) is an English former footballer who played as a midfielder in the Football League for Newcastle United and Darlington and in non-league football for Gateshead. He went on to play for many years in Belgian football, including seven seasons in the First Division, for Charleroi, La Louvière, Francs Borains and Sambreville.

== Life and career ==
Pugh was born in Corbridge, Northumberland, and attended Framwellgate Moor Comprehensive School in Durham. Offered trials by several clubs, he chose to begin his club career with Newcastle United. He made only one substitute appearance for the club's first team, on 7 November 1981, replacing Imre Varadi in a 2–1 defeat at Chelsea in the Second Division. He was released at the end of that season, and dropped into non-league football with Gateshead, playing regularly as they won the 1982–83 Northern Premier League title and with it promotion to the Alliance Premier League. He began the new season with Gateshead, joined Darlington for long enough to make two substitute appearances in the Fourth Division, and was back with Gateshead by October. (Note: The player's individual page at Neil Brown's site lists nine appearances and a goal, but both Hugman's 1998 PFA Premier & Football League Players' Records and the Darlington F.C. page at Neil Brown's site assign him two appearances and no goal.) He finished his Gateshead career with 24 goals from 76 appearances in all competitions, 5 goals from 36 appearances in the Alliance Premier League.

Pugh continued his career in Belgium with Charleroi. He captained the team to promotion via a fifth-place finish and the Second Division play-offs in his first season, and remained with the club for a further seven seasons in the First Division. He then spent four years with La Louvière, two in the third tier followed by two in the second, and finished his playing career in the fourth tier with a year at Francs Borains and two at Sambreville, whom he also coached.

After retiring from football, Pugh stayed in Belgium where he ran a bar in Charleroi.
