= Kevin Pugh =

Kevin Pugh may refer to:

- Kevin Pugh (footballer)
- Kevin Pugh (dancer)
