= Durham Indoor Market =

Historic marketplace in the city of Durham

Coordinates: 54°46′38″N 1°34′34″W

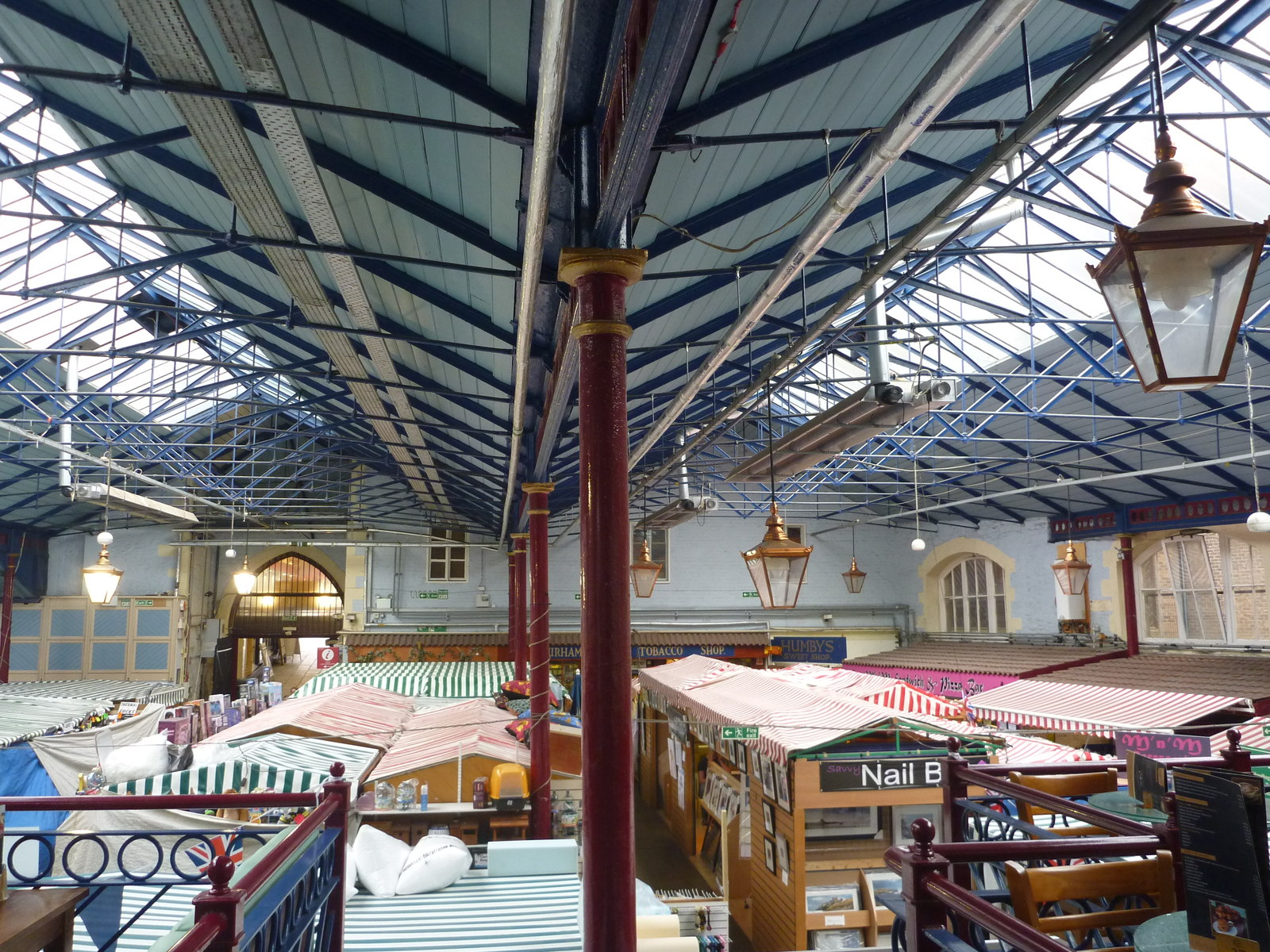
The indoor market

The indoor market

Durham Indoor Market is a covered market located off the Market Place in the City of Durham, England.

== History ==
The City of Durham has long had an association with markets going back to Saxon and Norman times. The Market Place became the focal point for traders to sell their wares alongside farmers, butchers, greengrocers, shoemakers, street peddlers and entertainers.

The area set aside for the new Market Hall was part of the site of New Place, the former palace and gardens built in the Middle Ages for the Nevilles of Raby and Brancepeth, the Earls of Westmoreland, who had forfeited the property to the Crown after their involvement in the ill-fated Rebellion of the North in 1569.

The palace was eventually bought from King James II in 1612 by Henry Smith's Charity and was used as a factory, workhouse and charity school before being demolished to ultimately make way for the present Market Hall.

The Town Hall, behind which lies the Market Hall

The Market Hall is described by Nikolaus Pevsner as "interior mostly with the usual cast-iron roof in a series of pitches on cast-iron columns, but stone vaulted at the north end. The back elevation, exposed to Leazes Road, has no Gothic pretences, just a massive retaining wall and plain segmental-headed windows under a row of gables".

By the start of the nineteenth century, overcrowding in the Market Place became a real problem with the various trades being widespread and disorganised throughout that part of the City. Traders banded together with local businessmen to petition for both the building of a purpose built Market Hall and for a more organised running of the Markets.

In May 1851, The Durham Markets Company Act was passed for establishing new Markets and Market Places in the City of Durham, for abolishing the Corn Tolls and "for regulating the Markets and Fairs within the said City and Suburbs therof and for other Purposes."

In the late nineteenth Century, fairs for horses, sheep and horned cattle were regularly held in the Market Hall and twice a year servants' hirings were held. Originally the Market was only open on a Saturday, when trading finished at 11pm with the ringing of the Market Bell, an example of which can still be seen today hanging in the Balcony Bistro.

== 1996 Re-Opening ==
As the demand for quality products at affordable prices increased, so the days of trading were extended until, following a major refurbishment, the Market Hall opened for trading from Monday to Saturday in November 1996. The refurbished Market Hall was officially opened by Tony Blair, the then Leader of the Opposition, on 20 December 1996, 144 years after the Market Hall had first opened.

Today the Indoor Market is home to over 50 traders selling a wide variety of food, goods and services and receives over 2 million visitors through its doors each year.

== Indoor Market Facts ==
- It has a giant mural of the City painted on an inner wall by Durham University's Student Community Action group in 2010.
- Since its reopening, it has entertained a number of famous guests including Sir Ming Campbell, Rt. Hon. Nick Clegg MP and writer Terry Deary and has played host to a number of live radio and TV broadcasts.
- Durham Indoor Market plays the lead role in organising the award-winning annual City of Durham Christmas Festival, the busiest retail weekend of the year in the City Centre.
- Durham Markets Company, which operates the Indoor Market, also runs a Saturday Outdoor Retail Market and the City's twice-yearly Continental Market in the Market Place. Durham Indoor Market plays the leading role in organising the Durham Christmas Festival and Durham City Food Festival.
- In 2010, the Indoor Market's mezzanine level was extended to provide greater facilities for retailers and a larger café bistro.
- In January 2011, Durham Indoor Market received the award "Best Private Market" from NABMA, the National Association of British Market Authorities.
