= Durham High School for Girls =

Former independent school in Durham, County Durham, England

Durham High School

Location
- Farewell Hall; Durham, County Durham, DH1 3TB; England; 54°45′24″N 1°35′14″W

Information
- Type: Independent school
- Motto: Be Your Best
- Religious affiliation: Church of England
- Established: 1884
- Closed: July 2, 2026
- Chair: Helen McMillan
- Head teacher: Michelle Hill
- Gender: coeducational (girls until Sep 2025)
- Age: 3 to 18
- Houses: Booth, Neville, Heath, Tempest
- Colours: Green and Gold
- House Colours: Blue, Red, Yellow and Black
- Website: www.durhamhighschool.com

Durham High School, formerly Durham High School for Girls, was a coeducational independent day school for children aged 3 to 18 years old in Durham, United Kingdom. Founded in 1884, it was for most of its existence a single-sex school for girls, until opting to admit boys from September 2025. The school closed permanently at the end of the 2025-26 academic year.

== History ==
The school was founded in 1884 and has occupied various sites during its history. Its final premises were located south of Durham City at Farewell Hall. The school was a member of the Girls' Schools Association.

Durham High School was judged as "Excellent" across all areas by the latest inspection carried out by the Independent Schools Inspectorate (ISI) in October 2022.

In July 2026, The Northern Echo and the BBC reported on uncertainty about whether the school would continue to operate in September 2026. A spokesperson for the school said "No decisions have been formally announced", and later confirmed the school will close at the end of the summer term.

The school closed their doors for its final time at the end of the summer term, ending on Thursday 2nd July 2026.

== Academic results ==
Academic results were higher than average, even for the independent sector. Government performance figures show 98% of students achieving 5 Grade A* - C grades or better in their General Certificates of Secondary Education.

In 2025 the school announced that they would begin accepting boys for Pre-Prep and Prep starting in September 2025, as well as male students for Senior School and Sixth Form in September 2026.

== Scholarships ==
The school offered a number of scholarships and bursaries, which included one what offered up to a 100% rebate on the fees for seven years. Scholarships and exhibitions in sport, music, drama and exam entrance awards were frequently awarded.

== Notable former pupils ==
- Amy Tinkler - Olympic Bronze Medallist (Gymnastics)
- Helen Bond, Professor of Christian Origins and Head of the School of Divinity, University of Edinburgh
- Mica McNeill - Olympian (bobsled)
- Wendy Craig - actress
- Wendy Gibson- actress and news presenter
