= Henry Blackett =

New Zealand storekeeper and politician

Henry Blackett (c. 1820 – 11 July 1907) was a New Zealand storekeeper and politician, he was born in Durham, England in circa 1820, he was the first Mayor of Rangiora.
