= Framwellgate Moor =

Village in County Durham, England

Coordinates: 54.799°N 1.59°W

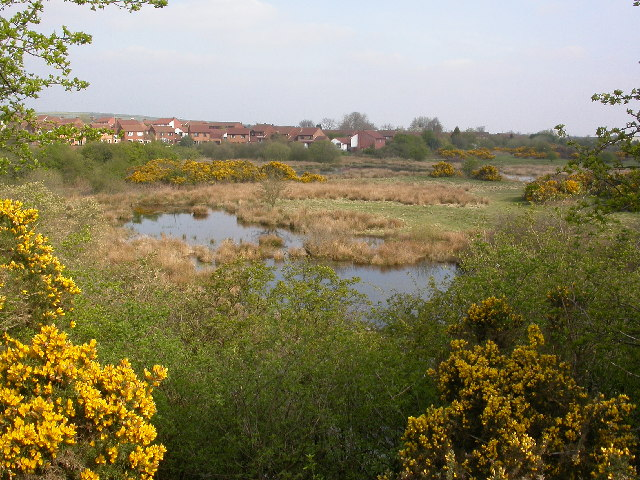
- The Carrs

- Location within County Durham
- Population: 6,112 (2011 census)
- OS grid reference: NZ262447
- Civil parish: Framwellgate Moor
- Unitary authority: County Durham
- Ceremonial county: County Durham
- Region: North East
- Country: England
- Sovereign state: United Kingdom
- Post town: DURHAM
- Postcode district: DH1
- Dialling code: 0191
- Police: Durham
- Fire: County Durham and Darlington
- Ambulance: North East
- UK Parliament: City of Durham

Framwellgate Moor is a village and civil parish in County Durham, England. It is situated to the north of Durham, and is adjacent to Pity Me and Newton Hall. It had a population of 5,404 in the 2011 Census. With a slight increase to 6,112 in a 2018 local report.

It is the location of New College Durham, the major further education establishment of the city. In addition, it is the location of Framwellgate School Durham which is a large and successful comprehensive school, science college and sixth form centre. The civil parish is based on the village of Framwellgate Moor and also includes neighbouring Pity Me and Brasside.

== Etymology and name ==
The name Framwellgate means "road to the vigorous spring/stream", and is derived from the Old English elements fram ("vigorous, strong") + wella ("a well") + the Old Norse gata ("a road").

== Governance ==
Framwellgate Moor is part of an electoral ward with Newton Hall, and has its own parish council.

== Climate ==
Climate in this area has mild differences between highs and lows, and there is adequate rainfall year-round. The Köppen Climate Classification subtype for this climate is "Cfb" (Marine West Coast Climate/Oceanic climate).
