= John Tindale =

English cricketer

Personal information
- Full name: John Tindale
- Born: 9 October 1967 (age 59); Durham, County Durham, England
- Batting: Right-handed
- Bowling: Right-arm medium-fast

Domestic team information
- Years: Team
- 1988–1990: Durham

Career statistics
Competition	List A
Matches	1
Runs scored	30
Batting average	30.00
100s/50s	–/–
Top score	30
Balls bowled	30
Wickets	–
Bowling average	–
5 wickets in innings	–
10 wickets in match	–
Best bowling	–
Catches/stumpings	–/–
- Source: Cricinfo, 8 August 2011

John Tindale (born 9 October 1967) is a former English cricketer. Tindale was a right-handed batsman who bowled right-arm medium-fast. He was born in Durham, County Durham.

Tindale made his debut for Durham against Bedfordshire in 1988 Minor Counties Championship. He played Minor counties cricket for Durham from 1988 to 1990, making 17 Minor Counties Championship appearances and 2 MCCA Knockout Trophy appearances. He made his only List A appearance against Somerset in the 1988 NatWest Trophy. He scored 30 runs in this match, before being stumped by Neil Burns off the bowling of Steve Waugh.
