= Durham police mast =

Structure in Durham, England

The Durham police mast (officially the County Police Communications Tower) was a structure that stood in the city of Durham in northern England. It was designed by county architect J. L. Parnaby and structural engineer Ove Arup and Partners. It was erected in 1968 and stood 162 feet (49 m) tall, providing radio communications for Durham Constabulary. It was built to a tripod design in reinforced concrete to satisfy a requirement for a rigid mast that was slender enough to minimise impact on views of Durham Cathedral. The structure was dismantled in 2017 as part of a redevelopment of the police headquarters but was required, by a planning condition, to be re-erected. In 2022 Durham Constabulary applied for permission to dispose of the mast but this was denied by Durham County Council in February 2023.

== Design and construction ==
Durham County Police (now known as Durham Constabulary) relocated their headquarters from Old Elvet in the city centre to a more expansive setting at Aykley Heads in 1964. As part of the relocation there was a requirement for a new radio mast to facilitate police communications. This was required to be at least 150 feet (46 m) in height to provide sufficient range. A further requirement was that the mast bend less than one degree in wind speeds of 50 miles per hour (80 km/h), as mast bending distorts the radio frequency.

The architectural design was carried out by county architect J. L. Parnaby and the structural design by Ove Arup and Partners. The designers settled on a tripod-based mast with three elements supporting a central mast upright. This design avoided high bending moments at the transition between the superstructure and foundation, reducing bending in the superstructure and improving the communications performance. The main upright was designed to be "ultra thin" to avoid blocking views of Durham Cathedral, the use of concrete allowed for a thinner upright than other materials given the bending constraint.

The structure was designed to be made from steel-reinforced concrete on a cast in-situ concrete foundation. The structure comprised three leg elements, a keystone and a 98-foot (30 m) high central mast portion. The design intentionally allowed for the pre-casting of the main concrete elements. These were cast on site with white Portland cement and lifted into place by two large cranes. The pre-cast design avoided the need for any scaffolding or formwork to be used in construction. There was also no need to install any restraints to support the structure against wind loading.

The completed structure measured 162 feet (49 m) from ground to the top of the concrete, where a spigot mounting allowed for the fixing of communications apparatus. It weighed 50 tonnes (55 tons). The construction of the structure cost £10,000 and was completed in 1968. The mast was commended by the judges at the Concrete Society's 1969 awards; they described it as "an attractive three-dimensional design in which a slender mast is superimposed over a tripod to avoid a guyed structure and yet retain sufficient stiffness to limit tilt and induced oscillation under wind loads".

When Charles, Prince of Wales visited the police headquarters on 31 May 1978 he was presented with a silver model of the mast. The mast was granted statutory protection by Historic England on 26 March 2003 when it became a grade II listed building, they described it as a "one-off elegant design".

== Dismantling ==
Durham Constabulary constructed a new headquarters nearby and, in 2012, applied for planning permission to redevelop the old site for housing. The police asked permission to demolish the mast but, following opposition from English Heritage and the City of Durham Trust, this was refused. The police argued that leaving the mast in situ would knock £1 million off the sale price for the land. Permission was granted for the demolition of the former headquarters and construction of 200 houses with a condition that the mast be re-erected at the new headquarters. It is thought that the old headquarters site was then sold by the police for £20 million.

The mast was dismantled in 2017, with the engineers involved viewing footage of its erection to help plan its dismantling. The mast components are in open-air storage next to the new headquarters site (54°47′14.1″N 1°34′53.4″W).

== Proposed demolition ==
In October 2022 Durham Constabulary applied for permission to demolish the structure, that is to dispose of it rather than re-erecting. The police claimed that the keystone of the mast had been damaged during dismantling and was beyond repair, requiring recasting. They also reported that structural surveys had shown "significant corrosion" in the mast elements. The police stated that the cost of re-erecting the mast was now £496,000, significantly more than their estimate of £400,000 made in 2019, with an additional £56,600 required for security fencing and ongoing maintenance liability of a further £421,900. The police also warned that the economic situation had changed since 2017 and there were more demands on their budget. They stated that if they were forced to re-erect the structure it would adversely affect "service delivery in terms of responding to crime and non-crime police incidents which in turn impacts upon community, victim and business confidence". Durham Constabulary looked at erecting the mast elsewhere but found no party willing to accept it because of the costs and risks of doing so. They also looked at storing the mast for future re-erection but found that warehousing would cost £750,000 upfront with £30-70,000 annual storage fees and that burial on site would cost £460,000. They estimate that disposal of the structure will cost £223,800.

The Twentieth Century Society have opposed the proposed demolition, noting that the mast is "a particularly valuable feature of Durham’s post-war architectural heritage" and provided "a placemaking focal point for the community, potentially even a symbol of local pride". The City of Durham Trust also opposed the proposed demolition, stating that "neglecting to maintain the structure is not a sound reason for applying for planning consent to be rid of it. It is an important principle in the planning process that neglect is not a cause for demolition – otherwise, anyone could allow a listed building to deteriorate if they wished to see it demolished". The application to demolish was refused by Durham County Council in February 2023.
