= Maiden Castle, Durham =

Maiden Castle
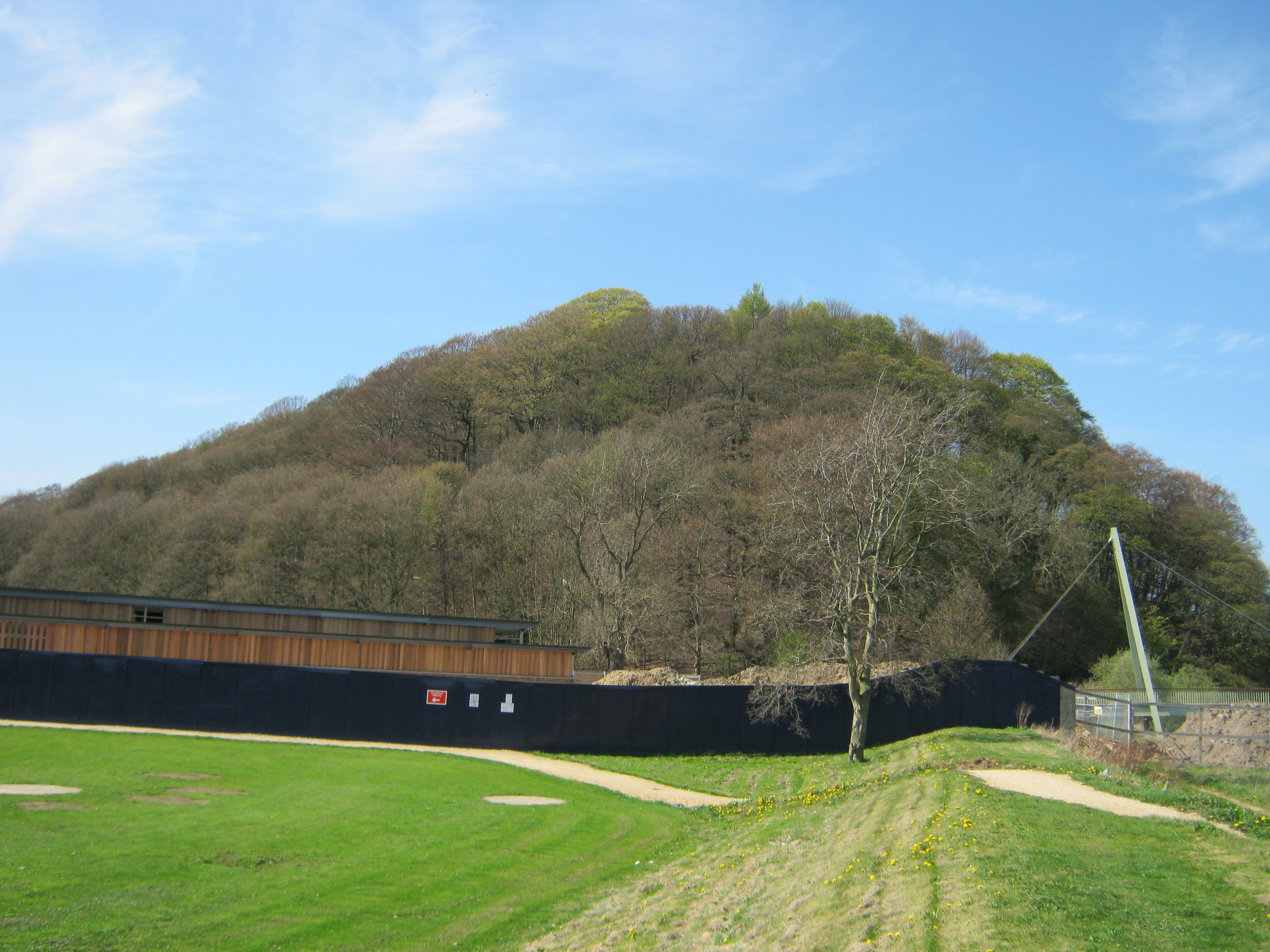

- Location within County Durham
- 54.769°N 1.561°W
- Location: Durham, England
- OS grid reference: NZ 283 417

History
- Built: Iron Age

Site notes
- Area: 1.23 ha (3.0 acres)
- Governing body: English Heritage
- Owner: Durham University

Scheduled monument
- Designated: 14 December 1926
- Reference no.: 1008844

Maiden Castle is an Iron Age promontory fort in Durham, England. It is listed as a scheduled monument.

== Location ==
The Victoria County History describes the location of the fort as follows:

This is a lofty promontory of great natural strength, to the east of the city [of Durham], and approached from the west side. The north, south and east slopes are very steep, especially the last, which rises about 100 feet above the river Wear

— William Page (ed), Victoria County History: Durham, vol 1 (1905), p 348

An earlier description gives more detail:

On the right and left the steep sides of the mount are covered with a thick forest of oaks: The crown of the mount consists of a level area or plain, forty paces wide on the summit of the scar, in the front or north east side, one hundred and sixty paces long on the left-hand side, and one hundred and seventy paces on the right. The approach is easy on the land side, from the south-west, fortified with a ditch and breast work: The entrance or passage over the ditch is not in the middle, but made to correspond with the natural rise of the outward ground ... The ditch is twelve paces wide, and runs with a little curvature to each edge of the slope, ... on one hand being fifty paces in length, and the other eighty paces. After passing the ditch there is a level parade or platform, twenty paces wide, and then a high earth fence, now nine feet perpendicular ... A breast work has run from the earth fence on each hand along the brink of the hill, to the edge of the cliff or scar. The earth fence closes the whole neck of land, and is in length one hundred paces, forming the south-west side of the area.

— William Hutchinson, The History & Antiquities of the County Palatine of Durham (1823), vol 2, p 395

Although the river Wear now touches the site only on one side, the local topography suggests that the site may have been chosen because, at that time, the river enclosed it on three sides, the river having since adopted a more easterly course across its floodplain.

== Structure ==
Although the entire site has been overgrown with trees for over a century, there are remains of earthworks at the western end.

Here, where the land is level, a bank and outer ditch were constructed, enclosing a wedge-shaped area which is 120 metres wide at the western end, narrowing to 50 m at the eastern end, and extending 145 m from east to west.

The bank is about 6 m wide and 5 m high. The ditch, which is located rather more than 20 m west of the bank, has a maximum depth of about 2 m.

It is not certain where the entrance to the fort was located. It may have been at the northern end, where there is a gap in the ditch, or at the extreme southern end, but the area has been disturbed by landscaping, making interpretation difficult.

Only limited excavation has been carried out on the site, but there is some evidence that the interior of the bank was strengthened with a stone wall; the excavation unearthed at least one stone bearing a stonemason's mark, which dates the work to the Middle Ages.

== Origin of the name ==
The name "maiden" probably means a "fortification that looks impregnable" or one that has never been taken in battle. Alternatively, Maiden Castle comes from the Brythonic *moe din meaning 'grassy plain'.
