= Durham School Boat Club =

British Rowing Club

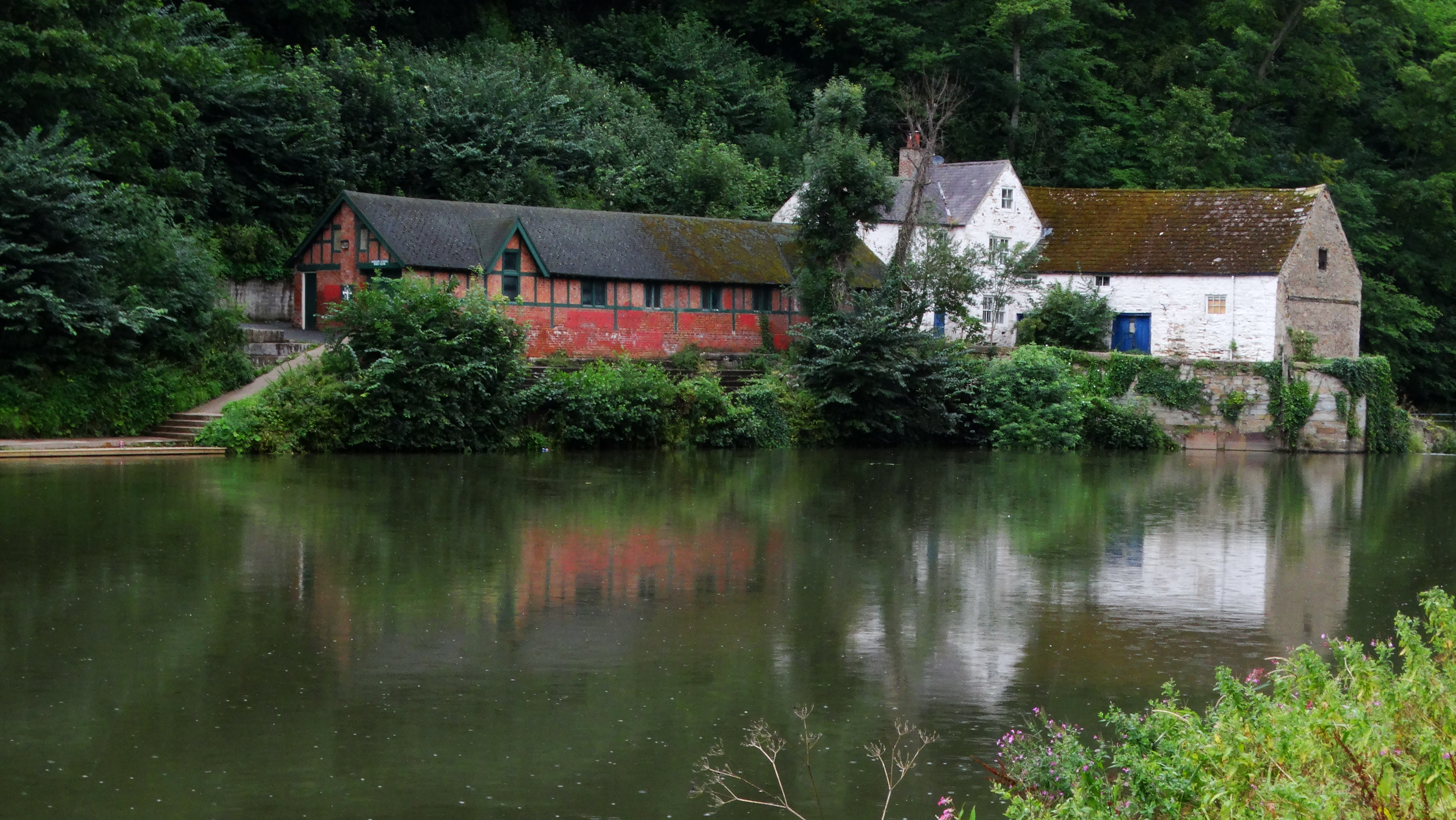

- Motto: Mileage Makes Champions
- Location: Durham School Durham
- Coordinates: 54°46′19.39″N 1°34′48.29″W
- Home water: River Wear
- Founded: 1847
- Affiliations: British Rowing Northern Rowing Council
- Website: dsbc.synthasite.com

Durham School Boat Club (DSBC) is a school club offering rowing to students, parents, friends and other local schools. Based at Durham School in the city of Durham, England.

== History ==
Durham School Boat Club was founded in 1847. However, there was rowing at Durham School in earlier years: the club was a founder of Durham Regatta in 1834 and it is, therefore, one of the oldest clubs on the River Wear in Durham. Record keeping in the early days was non-existent and the first reference to a School boat was to the four oared wherry Argo in 1838. At the regatta, the club went on to win its first Challenge Cup in 1865. The first club rower to win a blue for Oxford or Cambridge rowing in The Boat Race was W. King, who rowed for Oxford in 1854.

== Facilities ==
The club operates from its own boathouse situated just downstream of Prebends Bridge; this was built in 1892.

The club has a range of boats ranging in size from singles to eights and octuples. Durham School boats use the three letter boat code DUS.

== Philosophy ==
The club is not selective; that is, it is open to all students: "All year groups at the school have the opportunity to row at the appropriate level for their physiological and physical development".

The club also offers rowing to The Chorister School and parents and friends of Durham School.

== PODS ==
The Parents of Durham School Boat Club or PODS are a group of parents at the school who raise money to support the development of the Club.

== International representation ==
The club has been successful at international level, the athletes having represented their home countries and Great Britain at Olympic, World Championships, Under-23, University and Junior level, most recently being GB representation, winning a silver medal in the junior women's 8, at the 2010 Coupe de la Jeunesse in Hazewinkel, Belgium; England in the 2010 Home International Regatta in Cork, Ireland; the World Rowing Junior Championships in Brive-la-Gaillarde, France in August 2009; the Coupe de la Jeunesse in Cork, Ireland in 2008 and England representation at the Home International Regatta in 2006.

== National events ==
The club enters a number of local, national and international events. In addition to wide-ranging representation at the various north-eastern heads and regattas oarsmen and women of different ages are regularly entered in events further afield.

The club has been successful in the British Rowing Championships producing eight champion crews, the last in 2010 with Gold in the Open Junior Coxless Pair and women's eight composite.

In the National Schools Regatta in 2010 the club won silver in the Fours Cup for First Coxed Fours.

Recent years have also seen the club at Henley. The women's 1st Eight entered Henley Women's Regatta in 2010 for the first time in The Peabody Cup, losing to Headington School Oxford who went on to the final. The 1st Eight rowed in the Princess Elizabeth Challenge Cup at the Henley Royal Regatta in 2008 for the first time in over 40 years. Having pre-qualified again, the 1st Eight was in action in the Princess Elizabeth Challenge Cup at Henley Royal Regatta in 2009, achieving a win over Reading Blue Coat School in their first race before being knocked out by Abingdon School (one of the country's premier rowing schools who went through to the final) on the second day. The school achieved pre-qualification into the Princess Elizabeth Challenge Cup again in 2011, being knocked out by the Sophie Barat Schule. In 2013, Durham School Boat Club was the only club in the North-East of England to have a J18 boat qualify for an event at Henley Royal Regatta, pre-qualifying a first eight for the Princess Elizabeth Challenge Cup. They were beaten by Bedford School in the heats. Most recently competing at HRR in the Prince Elizabeth entering their men's 8+ in August 2021. Where they competed first day against Norwich School.

There are also frequent trips to various events held on the Tideway in London, the Holme Pierrepont National Watersports Centre and Dorney Lake. In 2012, the school achieved its first success at the School's Head of the River race on the Tideway, with the women's J16 4+ winning their category.

== International events ==
The club also trains and competes internationally.

Each year there is an annual training camp, previously to Gent with entry into the Gent Spring Regatta in Belgium. In 2010 the club won gold, silver and bronze medals in a number of categories. In 2011 the camp was on Lago d'Iseo in Italy, based in Lovere. Since 2012, the club has held its training camp annually in Soustons, France.

In addition, the club visited the United States in October 2008 to row in the Head of the Charles Regatta, achieving an excellent result for their first visit.

== Honours ==
=== British champions ===
Year	Winning crew/s
1992	Men J16 2x
1993	Men J18 4+
1994	Men J16 2x
2008	Open Ltw 2x, Open J16 4-
2009	Open Ltw 2x
2010	Women 8+, Open J16 2-

== See also ==
- List of rowing clubs on the River Wear
