= Newton Hall, Durham =

Housing estate in County Durham, United Kingdom

Coordinates: 54.798°N 1.576°W

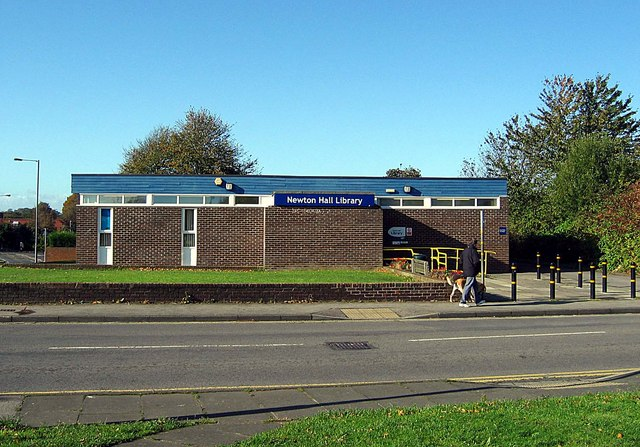
Newton Hall Library

Newton Hall is a large housing estate in County Durham, in England. It is situated to the north of Durham, near Framwellgate Moor, Pity Me and Brasside. The East Coast Main Line runs the length of its east boundary. It is also a ward of Durham with a population taken at the 2011 census of 7323.

== History ==
The first mention of Newton occurs about 1183, in the Boldon Book, a record of the estates of the Bishop of Durham, Hugh le Puiset. Newton is described as held by the Abbot of Peterborough, and amongst others holding an interest in the land is Richard the Engineer. He was the Bishop's famous mason/architect who was responsible for building Norham Castle in Northumberland and most probably worked on Le Puiset's additions to Durham Castle and Cathedral.

By 1337 the Bowes family held the manor of Newton and retained it until 1565, when it was sold to Anthony Middleton. On his death in 1581 it was sold to Thomas Blaikston, whose family kept the estate until shortly after 1662, when the Liddell family acquired it.

The Liddell family held Ravensworth Castle, near Gateshead, as well as Newton and it was this northern part of the county that they developed their coal mining interests and acquired their wealth. Sir Henry Liddell (c1644–1723) was one of the prime movers in attempts to regulate the North East coal trade in the early 18th century, and he served as MP for Durham in 1689 and 1695-8, and Newcastle from 1701 – 10. It was under his guidance that the old Newton Hall was restored around 1717–23.

Recently, a collection of Sir Henry's letters and drawings has come to light revealing a great deal about these buildings and gardens at Newton. One of the earliest is a builder's final account for the main construction work dated 5 November 1717. The resultant remodelling was very successful, as the Hall's handsome west front would show. During this remodelling it was decided to install new sash windows, something of a contemporary design statement. These were originally made in London and some were sent up to Newton, but after difficulties fixing them Sir Henry agreed to have local craftsmen do the work.

The gardens extended west and south of the Hall, with the service buildings to the north and east. Those at the north still exist today, at Brancepeth Close. A great walled garden was laid out to the south overlooking the City with formal ornate patterns with fashionable plants such as the pyramidal yew. To the west and beyond a small walled forecourt, stretched out the long avenue, framed by woodland on both sides.

Sir Henry never saw the house and gardens completed, dying in London in 1723. The Liddels stayed at Newton throughout the 18th century, extending the Hall in 1751 by adding an attic floor, probably within the earlier roof. Ravensworth Castle increasingly became their principal residence and in the 19th century the Newton Estate was sold to William Russell of Brancepeth Castle who began to rent it out to professional gentlemen and minor gentry.

Sir Julian Byng resided in Newton Hall for two years after purchasing it in 1909.

After Byng left, it ceased to be a private house and served as a branch of the County Lunatic Asylum. Finally vacated after the First World War, it was demolished in 1926. Its walls and gardens remained in a fragmentary state, in part, right up until the early 1970s, when the increasing demand for housing development on the old estate finally obliterated the upstanding remains.

The oldest remaining building on the site is Newton Hall farm cottage which stands hidden in trees off Carr House Drive, just down from the old fish pond which is drained but still visible. One of the wells used by the hall for drinking water still sits in what is now a garden close by. The majority of the other streets take their names from either cathedral cities (mainly those in the east of the estate) or castles in the north of England (mainly those in the west of the estate).

Photographs of the Hall in various states of repair as well as a map of the area before housing development hang in the Lounge of the Jovial Monk public house.

Newton Hall sits 2 miles (3.2 km) outside Durham City Centre. Most of the housing was built in the 1960s, 70s and 80s and is mainly 2 and 3 bedroomed Detached and semi-detached houses, along with some 1 and 2 bedroomed flats. The original community centre, which was one of the original farm buildings, along with the playground and tennis courts were demolished in 2007 to make way for a small development of housing. The prefabricated houses which were erected in the 1970's as temporary housing were vacated in 2025 and are due to be demolished by 2026.

== Public houses and shops ==
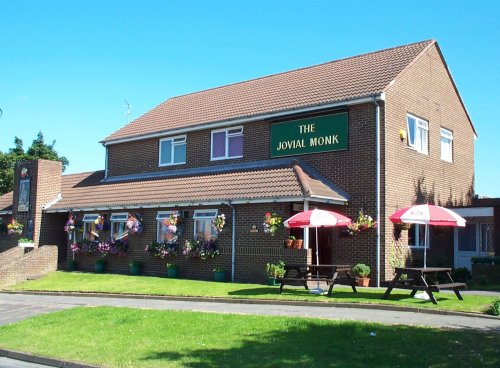
The Jovial Monk

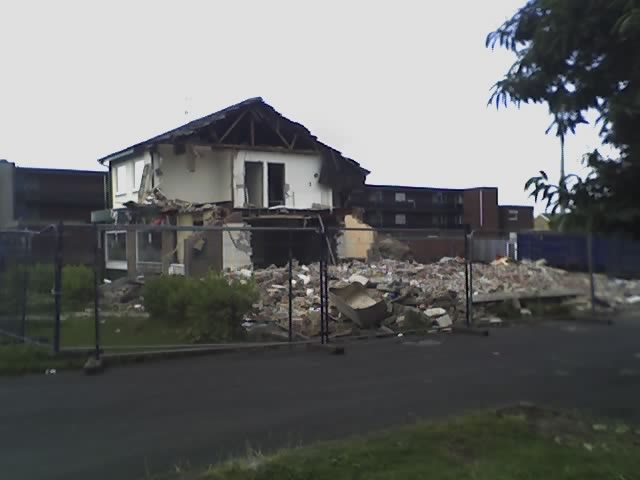
The Newton Hall

Newton Hall has two shopping parades and a public library. There are two public houses, the Jovial Monk built in 1980 and the Newton Grange built in 1982. The estate's first pub, the Newton Hall, was built in 1968 but was demolished in August 2009. A private nursing home now stands on the site.

The nearby Arnison Centre, built on fields in the 1990s, covers an area of 208,000 square feet (19,300 m^{2}).

== Transport ==
Newton Hall is bypassed by the A167 which connects to Darlington and Newcastle upon Tyne via Chester-le-Street along the former route of the A1 through the region. A projected link between the A690 and A167 is still to be realised. Newton Hall is well served by buses and is 2 miles (3.2 km) from Durham railway station on the East Coast Main Line.

== Education ==
The estate has several primary schools. Finchale Primary School and St Godric's Roman Catholic Primary School each comprise infant and juniors on the same site, whilst Newton Hall Infant School feeds into the adjoining Blue Coat Church of England Aided Junior School. The majority of Newton Hall children of secondary school age attend Framwellgate School Durham in nearby Framwellgate Moor, which also includes a sixth form. For further education, New College, Durham is nearby.

== In Culture ==
Newton Hall is the subject of the song "Livin' In Newton Hall" by the Toy Dolls on their 2000 album "Anniversary Anthems" (which despite the title was a studio album, not a compilation). Whilst the first verse lyric reads "A thousand streets of two bedroom semis. We always dreamed that we'd have one of these," the last begins "A thousand streets of shoe box semis. It's a nightmare livin' in one of these. We never dreamed it would end up like this." The song parodied those singer/songwriter Michael "Olga" Algar knew who moved to Newton Hall to escape the claustrophobic feeling living in one of Durham's old council estates only to find they'd swapped it for somewhere equally as suffocating once the novelty wore off.
