= Pity Me =

Area of Durham, England

Coordinates: 54.801°N 1.587°W

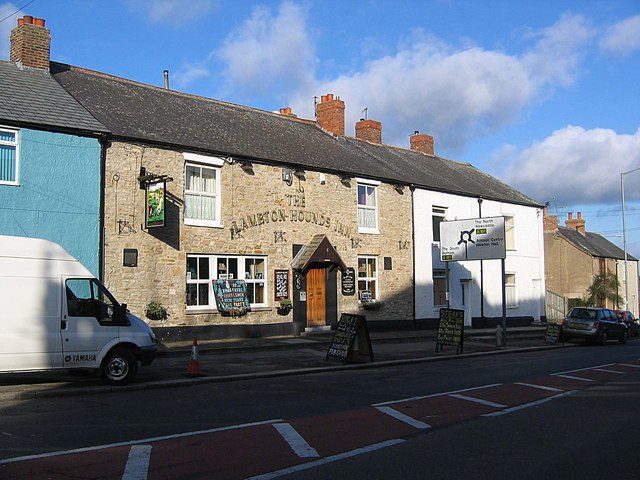
- La Spada Ristorante in Pity Me

- Location within County Durham
- OS grid reference: NZ265452
- Unitary authority: County Durham
- Ceremonial county: County Durham
- Region: North East
- Country: England
- Sovereign state: United Kingdom
- Post town: DURHAM
- Postcode district: DH1
- Dialling code: 0191
- Police: Durham
- Fire: County Durham and Darlington
- Ambulance: North East
- UK Parliament: City of Durham

Pity Me is a suburban village of Durham, England, located north of Framwellgate Moor and west of Newton Hall.

== Toponym ==
There are various theories on the origin of Pity Me's unusual name. Most likely, as speculated in the Oxford Dictionary of British Place Names, it is simply "a whimsical name bestowed in the 19th century on a place considered desolate, exposed or difficult to cultivate". Alternatively it may be a shortened form of an earlier place name referring to a shallow lake or mere, such as Petit Mere (i.e. from Norman French), Petty Mere or Peaty Mere. Related theories suggest that it comes from Pithead Mere, referring to an extended area of boggy waste ground onto which the outwash from minehead pumping engines was discharged, or that petite mer (French: small sea) is an ironic name for the settlement given the arid nature of the land.

However, the existence of several examples of other, lesser settlements, that share this name in Northumberland - particularly one north of Barrasford, near Hexham, and another outside Hartburn, west of Morpeth - suggests that it may be derived from some actual feature of the landscape, or former land-use, that has since been forgotten (one exotic suggestion for the North Tynedale example being the Ancient British term "Beddan Maes", meaning "burial ground" - although this suggestion has never been offered to explain the name of the Durham settlement. This form looks suspiciously like modern Welsh rather than any Brythonic name. As a Welsh name it makes no sense, although 'bedd' is 'grave', and 'maes' is 'open field').

More obvious folk etymologies include the story that the coffin of St Cuthbert was dropped near Pity Me on the way to Durham, at which point the saint implored the monks carrying him to take pity on him and be more careful; or that coming to the location during a flight from a Viking raid, a group of monks sang the 51st Psalm, the Latin version of which includes the words "Miserere mei, Deus", which may be rendered in English as "Pity me, O God".

== Transport ==
Pity Me is bypassed by the A167 which connects to Darlington and Newcastle via Chester-le-Street along the former route of the A1 through the region.

The Arnison Centre, an out of town retail park, is located on the edge of the village. It is served by several frequent bus routes operated by Go North East; destinations include Newcastle, Sunderland, Durham and Sherburn Village.

== See also ==
There are various other instances of the place name "Pity Me" in the north of England: near Morpeth and Barrasford in Northumberland, near Bradbury in south County Durham and Pityme in Cornwall.

Ordnance Survey grid references:

=== Northumberland ===
- 428140,563380 Pity Me hamlet demolished, on the north bank of River Tyne near St Anthony's.
- 428050,585740 Pityme building demolished, on the north bank of River Wansbeck east of North Seaton railway viaduct.
- 411790,586680 Pity Me building extant, west of Morpeth.
- 391860,576730 Pity Me building extant, north of Barrasford.

=== County Durham ===
- 419530,529560 Pity Me building demolished, on the south bank of River Wear west of Bishop Auckland.
- 432420,550360 Pity Me building demolished, now the site of Sedgeletch Industrial Estate, Fencehouses.
- 430160,528390 Pity Me building demolished, west of Bradbury.
- 397030,540330 Pityme Spring watercourse extant, west of Stanhope.

Other unusual place names in the North East include the village of No Place, believed to be a contraction of North Place, as marked on the original Ordnance Survey maps, and Bearpark, from Beaurepaire, French for "beautiful retreat" - the name of a nearby Norman priory.
