= Durham, England =

City in County Durham, England

Durham
- City and civil parish
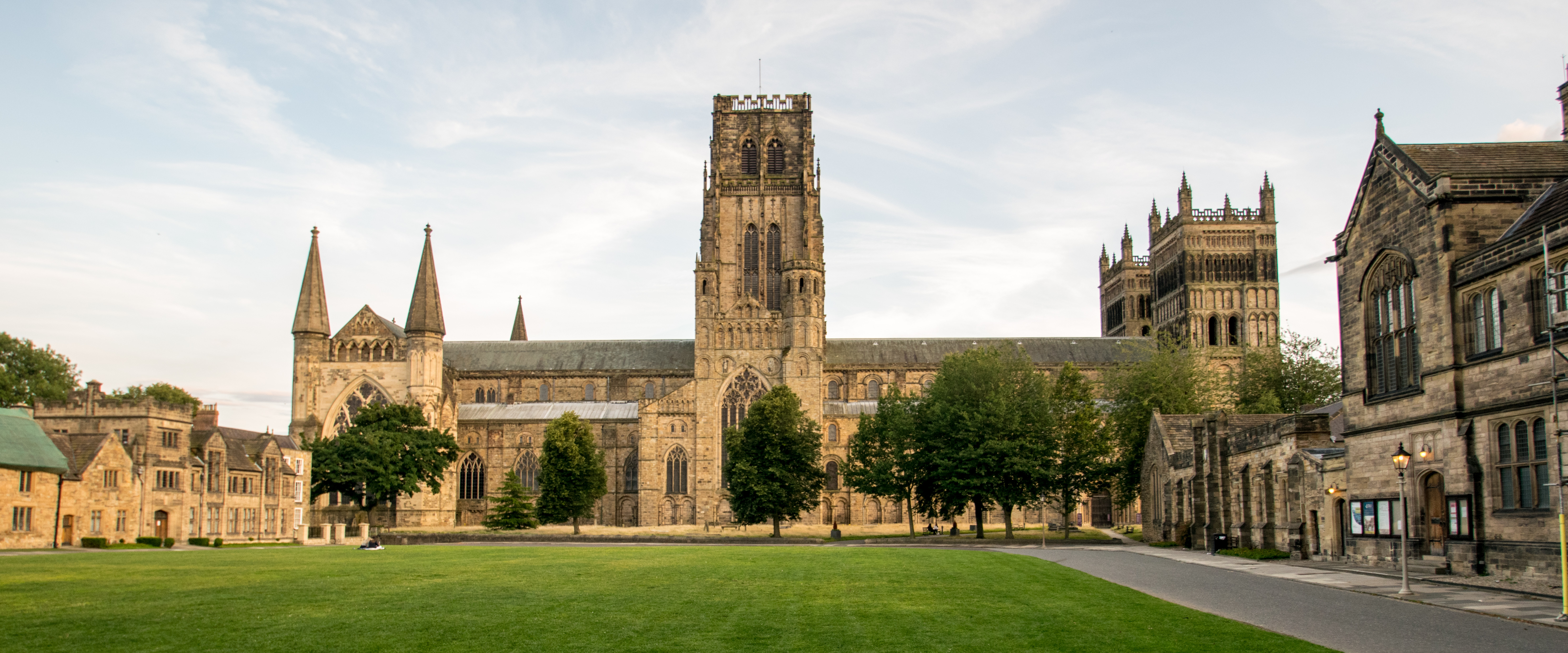
- Durham Cathedral Durham Castle St Nicholas Church Elvet Bridge

- Coat of arms

- Location within County Durham
- Area: 14.8 km^{2} (5.7 sq mi)
- Population: 50,510 (2021 census)
  - Density: 3,413/km^{2} (8,840/sq mi)
- Founded: 995
- Civil parish established: 1 April 2018
- Civil parish: City of Durham
- Unitary authority: County Durham
- Ceremonial county: County Durham
- Region: North East
- Country: England
- Sovereign state: United Kingdom
- Areas of the city (2011 census BUASD): List: The Bailey; Belmont (parish); Brasside; Crossgate; Elvet; Framwelgate; Framwellgate Moor (parish); Gilesgate (no parish); Kepier; Neville's Cross; Newton Hall (no parish); Pity Me
- Post town: DURHAM
- Postcode district: DH1
- Dialling code: 0191
- Police: Durham
- Fire: County Durham and Darlington
- Ambulance: North East
- Website: cityofdurham-pc.gov.uk

Durham (/ˈdʌrəm/ DURR-əm, locally /ˈdɜːrəm/) (Note: In general Northern England English, the city's name is pronounced /ˈdʊrəm/.) is a cathedral city and civil parish in County Durham, England. It is the county town and contains the headquarters of Durham County Council, the unitary authority which governs the district of County Durham. The built-up area had a population of 50,510 at the 2021 Census.

The city was built on a meander of the River Wear, which surrounds the centre on three sides and creates a narrow neck on the fourth. The surrounding land is hilly, except along the Wear's flood plain to the north and south-east.

Durham was founded in 995 by Anglo-Saxon monks seeking a place safe from Viking raids to house the relics of St Cuthbert. The church the monks built lasted only a century, as it was replaced by the present Durham Cathedral after the Norman Conquest; together with Durham Castle, it is a UNESCO World Heritage Site. From the 1070s until 1836, the city was part of the County Palatine of Durham, a semi-independent jurisdiction ruled by the prince bishops of Durham which acted as a geopolitical buffer between the kingdoms of England and Scotland. In 1346, the Battle of Neville's Cross was fought half a mile west of the city, resulting in an English victory. In 1650, the cathedral was used to house Scottish prisoners after their defeat at the Battle of Dunbar. During the Industrial Revolution, the Durham coalfield was heavily exploited, with dozens of collieries operating around the city and in nearby villages. Although these coal pits have now closed, the annual Durham Miners' Gala continues and is a major event for the city and region. Historically, Durham was also known for the manufacture of hosiery, carpets, and mustard.

The city is the home of Durham University, which was founded in 1832 and therefore has a claim to be the third-oldest university in England. The university is a significant employer in the region, alongside the local council and national government at the land registry and passport office. The University Hospital of North Durham and HM Prison Durham are also located close to the city centre. The city also has significant tourism and hospitality sectors.

== Toponymy ==
The name "Durham" comes from the Brythonic element dun, signifying a hill fort, and the Old Norse holme, which translates as island. The Lord Bishop of Durham uses a Latin variation of the city's name in his official signature, which is signed "N. Dunelm". Some attribute the city's name to the legend of the Dun Cow and the milkmaid who in legend guided the monks of Lindisfarne carrying the body of Saint Cuthbert to the site of the present city in 995 AD. Dun Cow Lane is said to be one of the first streets in Durham, being directly to the east of Durham Cathedral and taking its name from a depiction of the city's founding etched in masonry on the south side of the cathedral. The city has been known by a number of names throughout history. The original Nordic Dun Holm was changed to Duresme by the Normans and was known in Latin as Dunelm. The modern form Durham came into use later in the city's history. The north-eastern historian Robert Surtees chronicled the name changes in his History and Antiquities of the County Palatine of Durham but states that it is an "impossibility" to tell when the city's modern name came into being.

Durham is likely to be Gaer Weir in Armes Prydein, derived from Brittonic cajr meaning "an enclosed, defensible site, fort" from Latin castrum, “fort, military settlement” (cf. Carlisle; Welsh caer) and the river-name Wear.

== History ==
=== Early history ===
Archeological evidence suggests a history of settlement in the area since roughly 2000 BC. The present city can clearly be traced back to AD 995, when a group of monks from Lindisfarne chose the strategic high peninsula as a place to settle with the body of Saint Cuthbert, that had previously lain in Chester-le-Street, founding a church there.

=== City origins, the Dun Cow story ===
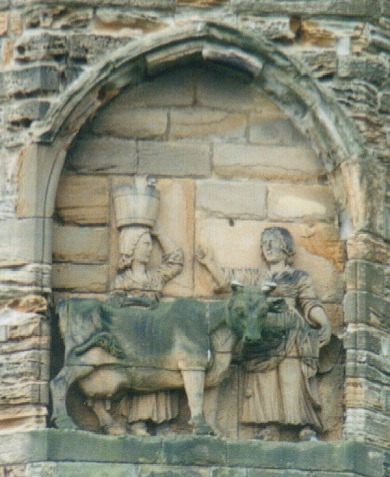
Legend of the founding of Durham (from a carving on the north side of the cathedral)

Local legend states that the city was founded in A.D. 995 by divine intervention. The 12th-century chronicler Symeon of Durham recounts that after wandering in the north, Saint Cuthbert's bier miraculously came to a halt at the hill of Warden Law and, despite the effort of the congregation, would not move. Aldhun, Bishop of Chester-le-Street and leader of the order, decreed a holy fast of three days, accompanied by prayers to the saint. During the fast, Saint Cuthbert appeared to a certain monk named Eadmer, with instructions that the coffin should be taken to Dun Holm. After Eadmer's revelation, Aldhun found that he was able to move the bier, but did not know where Dun Holm was.

The legend of the Dun Cow, which is first documented in The Rites of Durham, an anonymous account about Durham Cathedral, published in 1593, builds on Symeon's account. According to this legend, by chance later that day, the monks came across a milkmaid at Mount Joy (southeast of present-day Durham). She stated that she was seeking her lost dun cow, which she had last seen at Dun Holm. The monks, realising that this was a sign from the saint, followed her. They settled at a wooded "hill-island" – a high wooded rock surrounded on three sides by the River Wear. There they erected a shelter for the relics, on the spot where Durham Cathedral would later stand. Symeon states that a modest wooden building erected there shortly thereafter was the first building in the city. Bishop Aldhun subsequently had a stone church built, which was dedicated in September 998. This no longer remains, having been supplanted by the Norman structure.

The legend is interpreted by a Victorian relief stone carving on the north face of the cathedral and, more recently, by the bronze sculpture 'Durham Cow' (1997, Andrew Burton), which reclines by the River Wear in view of the cathedral.

=== Medieval era ===
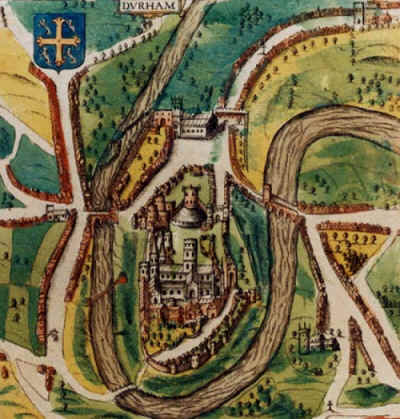
A map of the city from 1610

During the medieval period the city gained spiritual prominence as the final resting place of Saint Cuthbert and Saint Bede the Venerable. The shrine of Saint Cuthbert, situated behind the High Altar of Durham Cathedral, was the most important religious site in England until the martyrdom of St Thomas Becket at Canterbury in 1170.

Saint Cuthbert became famous for two reasons. Firstly, the miraculous healing powers he had displayed in life continued after his death, with many stories of those visiting the saint's shrine being cured of all manner of diseases. This led to him being known as the "wonder worker of England". Secondly, after the first translation of his relics in 698 AD, his body was found to be incorruptible. Apart from a brief translation back to Holy Island during the Norman Invasion the saint's relics have remained enshrined to the present day. Saint Bede's bones are also entombed in the cathedral, and these also drew medieval pilgrims to the city.

In 1070, William I recognised the natural strength of Durham's site and began to construct a castle. Durham's geographical position has always given it an important place in the defence of England against the Scots. The city played an important part in the defence of the north, and Durham Castle is the only Norman castle keep never to have suffered a breach. In 1314, the Bishopric of Durham paid the Scots a 'large sum of money' not to burn Durham. The Battle of Neville's Cross took place around half a mile west of the city on 17 October 1346 between the English and Scots and was a disastrous loss for the Scots.

The city suffered from plague outbreaks in 1544, 1589 and 1598.

=== Bishops of Durham ===
Owing to the divine providence evidenced in the city's legendary founding, the Bishop of Durham has always enjoyed the formal title "Bishop by Divine Providence", similar to the archbishops of Canterbury and York, as opposed to the style of "Bishop by Divine Permission" used by most bishops. However, as the north-east of England lay so far from Westminster, the bishops of Durham enjoyed extraordinary powers such as the ability to hold their own parliament, raise their own armies, appoint their own sheriffs and Justices, administer their own laws, levy taxes and customs duties, create fairs and markets, issue charters, salvage shipwrecks, collect revenue from mines, administer the forests and mint their own coins.

So far-reaching were the bishop's powers that the steward of Bishop Antony Bek commented in 1299 AD: "There are two kings in England, namely the Lord King of England, wearing a crown in sign of his regality and the Lord Bishop of Durham wearing a mitre in place of a crown, in sign of his regality in the diocese of Durham". All this activity was administered from the castle and buildings surrounding the Palace Green. Many of the original buildings associated with these functions of the county palatine survive on the peninsula that constitutes the ancient city.

The entrance to Durham Castle, the bishops' palace until 1832 when it moved to Auckland Castle

From 1071 to 1836 the bishops of Durham ruled the county palatine of Durham. Although the term "prince bishop" has been used as a helpful tool in the understanding the functions of the bishops of Durham in this era, it is not a title they would have recognised. The last bishop to rule the palatinate, Bishop William Van Mildert, is credited with the foundation of Durham University in 1832. Henry VIII curtailed some of the bishop's powers and, in 1538, ordered the destruction of the shrine of Saint Cuthbert.

A UNESCO site describes the role of the bishops in the "buffer state between England and Scotland":

From 1075, the Bishop of Durham became a Prince-Bishop, with the right to raise an army, mint his own coins, and levy taxes. As long as he remained loyal to the king of England, he could govern as a virtually autonomous ruler, reaping the revenue from his territory, but also remaining mindful of his role of protecting England's northern frontier.

=== Legal system ===
The bishops had their own court system, including most notably the Court of Chancery of the County Palatine of Durham and Sadberge. The county also had its own attorney general, whose authority to bring an indictment for criminal matters was tested by central government in the case of R v Mary Ann Cotton (1873). Certain courts and judicial posts for the county were abolished by the Supreme Court of Judicature Act 1873. Section 2 of the Durham (County Palatine) Act 1836 and section 41 of the Courts Act 1971 abolished others.

=== Civil War and Cromwell (1640 to 1660) ===
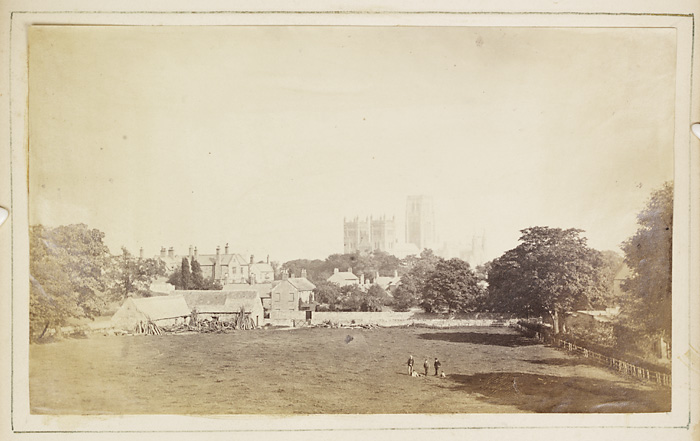
View of Durham Cathedral and its surroundings c. 1850

The city remained loyal to King Charles I in the English Civil War – from 1642 to the execution of the king in 1649. Charles I came to Durham three times during his reign of 1625–1649. He first came in 1633 to the cathedral for a majestic service, in which he was entertained by the Chapter and Bishop at great expense. He returned during preparations for the First Bishops' War (1639). His final visit to the city came towards the end of the civil war; he escaped from the city as Oliver Cromwell's forces got closer.

Local legend stated that he escaped down the Bailey and through Old Elvet. Another local legend has it that Cromwell stayed in a room in the present Royal County Hotel on Old Elvet during the civil war. The room is reputed to be haunted by his ghost. Durham suffered greatly during the civil war (1642–1651) and Commonwealth (1649–1660). This was not due to direct assault by Cromwell or his allies, but to the abolition of the Church of England and the closure of religious institutions pertaining to it. The city has always relied upon the Dean and Chapter and cathedral as an economic force.

The castle suffered considerable damage and dilapidation during the Commonwealth due to the abolition of the office of bishop (whose residence it was). Cromwell confiscated the castle and sold it to the Lord Mayor of London shortly after taking it from the bishop. A similar fate befell the cathedral, it being closed in 1650 and used to incarcerate 3,000 Scottish prisoners, who were marched south after the Battle of Dunbar. Graffiti left by them can still be seen today etched into the interior stone.

At the Restoration in 1660, John Cosin (a former canon) was appointed bishop (in office: 1660–1672) and set about a major restoration project. This included the commissioning of the famous elaborate woodwork in the cathedral choir, the font cover and the Black Staircase in the castle. Bishop Cosin's successor Bishop Lord Nathaniel Crewe (in office: 1674–1721) carried out other renovations both to the city and to the cathedral.

=== 18th century ===
A plan to turn Durham into a seaport through the digging of a canal north to join the River Team, a tributary of the River Tyne near Gateshead, was proposed by John Smeaton. Nothing came of the plan, but the statue of Neptune in the Market Place was a constant reminder of Durham's maritime possibilities.

The thought of ships docking at the Sands or Millburngate remained fresh in the minds of Durham merchants. In 1758, a new proposal hoped to make the Wear navigable from Durham to Sunderland by altering the river's course, but the increasing size of ships made this impractical. Moreover, Sunderland had grown as the north east's main port and centre for shipping.

In 1787, the Durham infirmary was founded.

The 18th century also saw the rise of the trade-union movement in the city.

=== 19th century ===
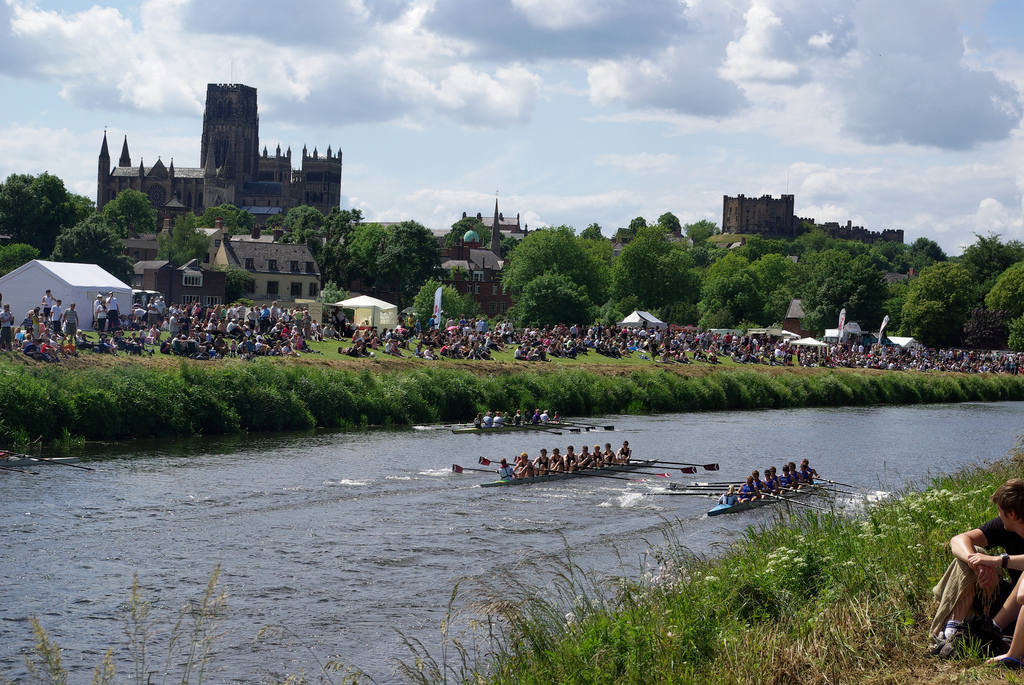
Durham Cathedral and Durham Castle as seen from the river bank whilst a boat race takes place between University College, Durham and Newcastle University

The Municipal Corporations Act 1835 gave governing power of the town to an elected body. All other aspects of the Bishop's temporal powers were abolished by the Durham (County Palatine) Act 1836 and returned to the Crown.

The Representation of the People Act 2000 and is regarded as the second most senior bishop and fourth most senior clergyman in the Church of England. The Court of Claims of 1953 granted the traditional right of the bishop to accompany the sovereign at the coronation, reflecting his seniority.

The first census, conducted in 1801, states that Durham City had a population of 7,100. The Industrial Revolution mostly passed the city by. However, the city was well known for carpet making and weaving. Although most of the mediaeval weavers who thrived in the city had left by the 19th century, the city was the home of Hugh MacKay Carpets' factory, which produced the famous brands of axminster and tufted carpets until the factory went into administration in April 2005. Other important industries were the manufacture of mustard and coal extraction.

The Industrial Revolution also placed the city at the heart of the coalfields, the county's main industry until the 1970s. Practically every village around the city had a coal mine and, although these have since disappeared as part of the regional decline in heavy industry, the traditions, heritage and community spirit are still evident.

The 19th century also saw the founding of Durham University thanks to the benevolence of Bishop William Van Mildert and the Chapter in 1832. Durham Castle became the first college (University College, Durham) and the bishop moved to Auckland Castle as his only residence in the county. Bishop Hatfield's Hall (later Hatfield College, Durham) was added in 1846 specifically for the sons of poorer families, the Principal inaugurating a system new to English university life of advance fees to cover accommodation and communal dining.

The first Durham Miners' Gala was attended by 5,000 miners in 1871 in Wharton Park, and remains the largest socialist trade union event in the world.

=== 20th century ===
Early in the century, coal became depleted, with a particularly important seam worked out in 1927, and in the following Great Depression Durham was among those towns that suffered exceptionally severe hardship. However, the university expanded greatly. St John's College and St Cuthbert's Society were founded on the Bailey, completing the series of colleges in that area of the city. From the early 1950s to early 1970s, the university expanded to the south of the city centre. Trevelyan, Van Mildert, Collingwood, and Grey colleges were established, and new buildings for St Aidan's and St Mary's colleges for women, formerly housed on the Bailey, were created. The final 20th century collegiate addition came from the merger of the independent nineteenth-century colleges of the Venerable Bede and St Hild, which joined the university in 1979 as the College of St Hild and St Bede. The 1960s and 1970s also saw building on New Elvet. Dunelm House for the use of the students' union was built first, followed by Elvet Riverside, containing lecture theatres and staff offices. To the southeast of the city centre sports facilities were built at Maiden Castle, adjacent to the Iron Age fort of the same name, and the Mountjoy site was developed, starting in 1924, eventually containing the university library, administrative buildings, and facilities for the Faculty of Science.

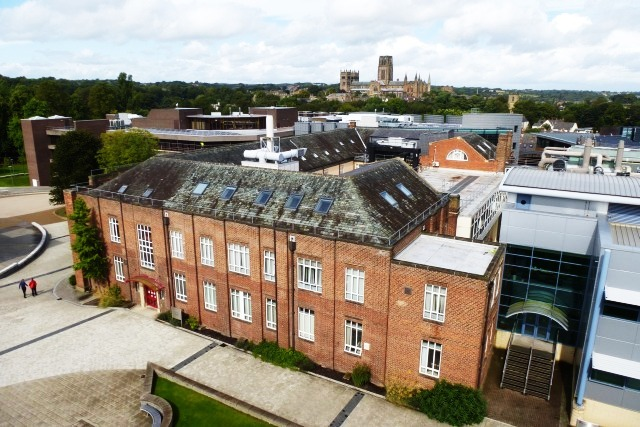
View over the university's Mountjoy site towards the cathedral

Durham was not bombed during World War II, though one raid on the night of 30 May 1942 did give rise to the local legend of 'St Cuthbert's Mist'. This states that the Luftwaffe attempted to target Durham, but was thwarted when Cuthbert created a mist that covered both the castle and cathedral, sparing them from bombing. The exact events of the night are disputed by contemporary eyewitnesses. The event continues to be referenced within the city, including inspiring the artwork 'Fogscape #03238' at Durham Lumiere 2015.

Durham Castle and Cathedral was named a UNESCO World Heritage Site in 1986. Among the reasons given for the decision were 'Durham Cathedral [being] the largest and most perfect monument of "Norman" style architecture in England', and the cathedral's vaulting being an early and experimental model of the gothic style. Other important UNESCO sites near Durham include Auckland Castle, North of England Lead Mining Museum and Beamish Museum.

=== 21st century ===
In 2025, Durham became a UNESCO Learning City, one of twelve in the UK and 425 globally.

== Geography ==
=== General ===
Place	Distance	Direction	Relation
London	234 miles (377 km)	South	Capital
Darlington	17 miles (27 km)	South	Largest place in the county
South Shields	16 miles (26 km)	North east	Combined authority area
Gateshead	12 miles (19 km)	North	Combined authority area
Sunderland	11 miles (18 km)	North east	Next nearest city
Washington	8 miles (13 km)	North east	Combined authority area
Chester-le-Street	7 miles (11 km)	North	Nearby large town

The River Wear at Durham, looking toward Milburngate Bridge

The River Wear flows north through the city, making an incised meander which encloses the centre on three sides to form Durham's peninsula. At the base of the peninsula is the Market Place, which still hosts regular markets; a permanent indoor market, Durham Indoor Market, is also situated just off the Market Place. The Market Place and surrounding streets are one of the main commercial and shopping areas of the city. From the Market Place, the Bailey leads south past Palace Green; The Bailey is almost entirely owned and occupied by the university and the cathedral.

Durham is a hilly city, claiming to be built upon the symbolic seven hills. Upon the most central and prominent position high above the Wear, the cathedral dominates the skyline. The steep riverbanks are densely wooded, adding to the picturesque beauty of the city. West of the city centre, another river, the River Browney, drains south to join the Wear to the south of the city.

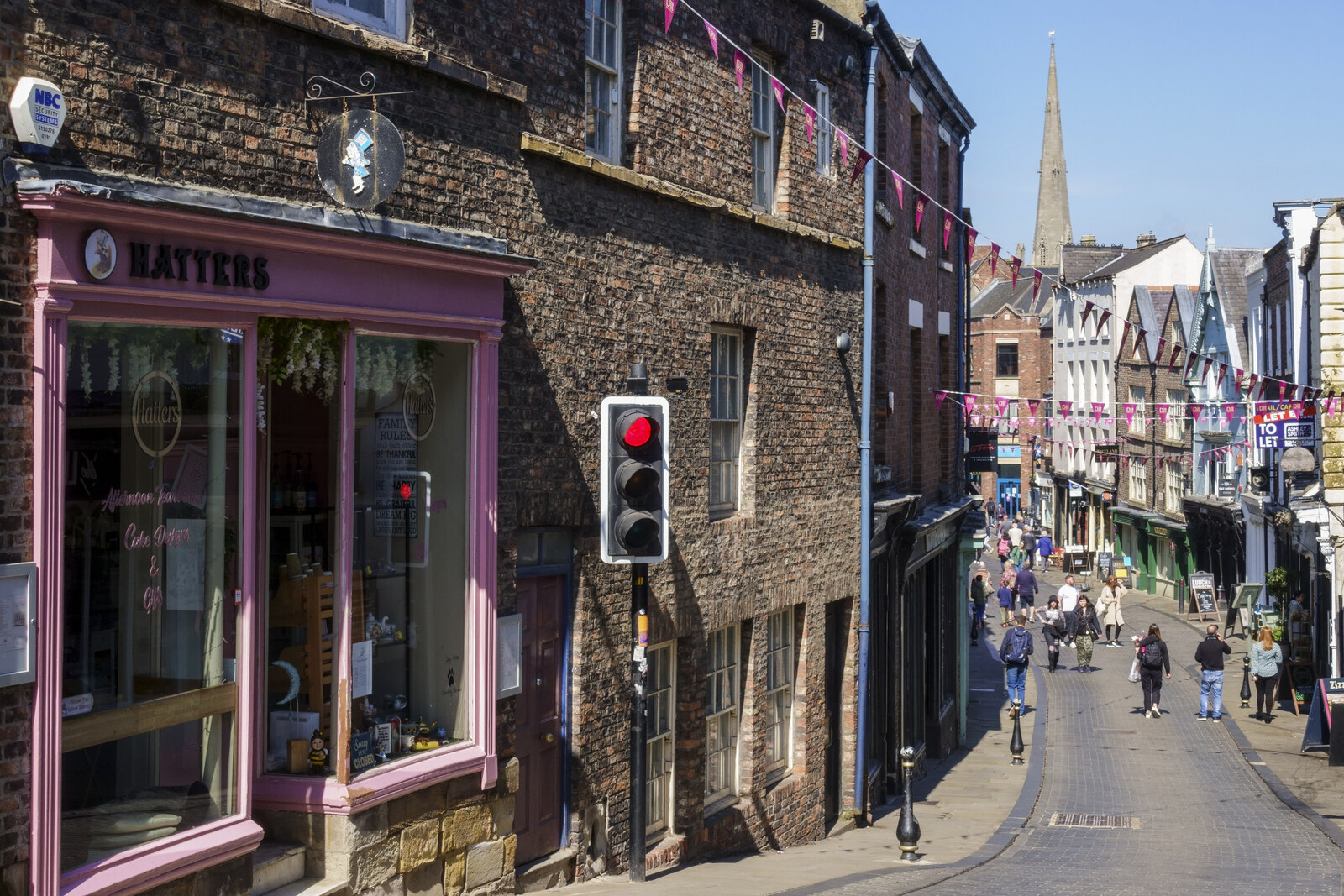
Saddler Street looking to the market square

There are three old roads out of the Market Place: Saddler Street heads south-east, towards Elvet Bridge, the Bailey and Prebends Bridge. Elvet Bridge leads to the Elvet area of the city, Durham Prison and the south; Prebends Bridge is smaller and provides access from the Bailey to south Durham. Heading west, Silver Street leads out of the Market Place towards Framwellgate Bridge and North Road, the other main shopping area of the city. From here, the city spreads out into the Framwelgate, Crossgate, Neville's Cross and viaduct districts, which are largely residential areas. Beyond the viaduct lie the outlying districts of Framwellgate Moor and Neville's Cross. Heading north from the Market Place leads to Claypath. The road curves back round to the east and beyond it lie Gilesgate, Gilesgate Moor and Dragonville.

==== Green belt ====
As part of the wider Tyne and Wear Green Belt area, Durham's portion extends beyond its urban area extents of Framwellgate Moor/Pity Me, Elvet and Belmont, it being completely surrounded by green belt. This primarily helps to maintain separation from Chester-le-Street, and restrain expansion of the city and coalescence with nearby villages such as Bearpark, Great Lumley and Sherburn. Landscape features and facilities within the green belt area include Raintonpark Wood, Belmont Viaduct, Ramside Hall, Durham City Golf Course, the River Wear, Browney and Deerness basins, and Durham University Botanic Gardens. It was first drawn up in the 1990s.

=== Historical ===
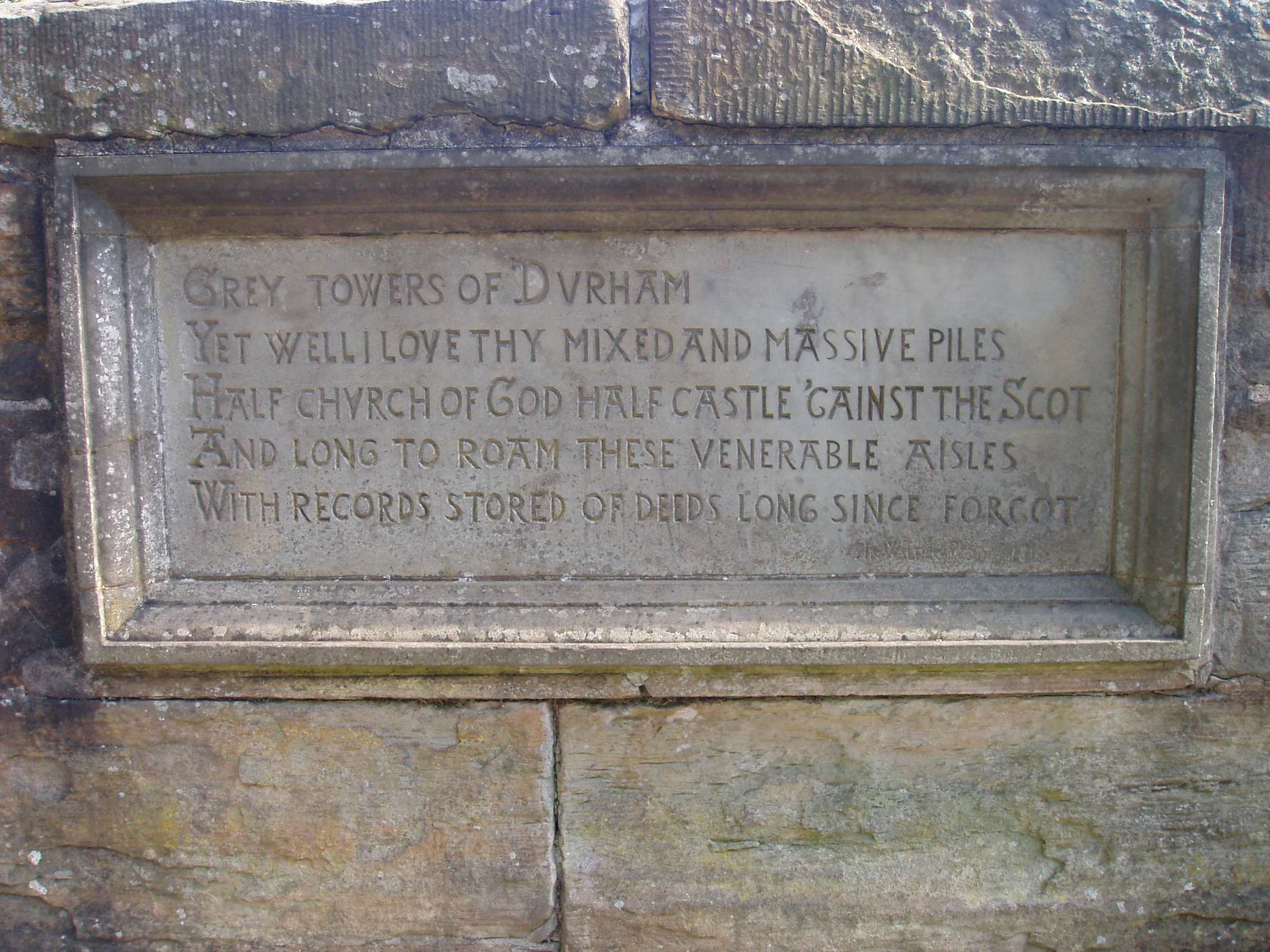
Sir Walter Scott's words on Durham are inscribed into Prebends Bridge

The historic city centre of Durham has changed little over 200 years. It is made up of the peninsula containing the cathedral, palace green, former administrative buildings for the palatine and Durham Castle. This was a strategic defensive decision by the city's founders and gives the cathedral a striking position; so much so that Symeon of Durham stated:

To see Durham is to see the English Sion and by doing so one may save oneself a trip to Jerusalem.

Sir Walter Scott was so inspired by the view of the cathedral from South Street that he wrote "Harold the Dauntless", a poem about Saxons and Vikings set in County Durham and published on 30 January 1817. The following lines from the poem are carved into a stone tablet on Prebends Bridge:

Grey towers of Durham
Yet well I love thy mixed and massive piles
Half church of God, half castle 'gainst the Scot
And long to roam those venerable aisles
With records stored of deeds long since forgot.

The old commercial section of the city encompasses the peninsula on three sides, following the River Wear. The peninsula was historically surrounded by the castle wall extending from the castle keep and broken by two gatehouses to the north and west of the enclosure. After extensive remodelling and "much beautification" by the Victorians the walls were removed with the exception of the gatehouse which is still standing on the Bailey.

The medieval city was made up of the cathedral, castle and administrative buildings on the peninsula. The outlying areas were known as the townships and owned by the bishop, the most famous of these being Gilesgate (which still contains the mediaeval St Giles Church), Claypath and Elvet.

The outlying commercial section of the city, especially around the North Road area, saw much change in the 1960s during a redevelopment spearheaded by Durham City Council; however, much of the original mediaeval street plan remains intact in the area close to the cathedral and market place. Most of the mediaeval buildings in the commercial area of the city have disappeared apart from the House of Correction and the Chapel of Saint Andrew, both under Elvet Bridge. Georgian buildings can still be found on the Bailey and Old Elvet most of which make up the colleges of Durham University.

=== Climate ===
The table below gives the average temperature, rainfall and sunshine figures taken between 1991 and 2020, and extreme temperatures back to 1850 for the weather station at Durham University Observatory:

Climate data for Durham Coordinates 54°46′04″N 1°35′04″W; elevation: 102 m (335 ft) 1991–2020 normals, extremes 1843–2023
Month	Jan	Feb	Mar	Apr	May	Jun	Jul	Aug	Sep	Oct	Nov	Dec	Year
Record high °C (°F)	16.3 (61.3)	17.4 (63.3)	21.8 (71.2)	24.1 (75.4)	29.7 (85.5)	30.7 (87.3)	36.9 (98.4)	32.5 (90.5)	30.0 (86.0)	25.3 (77.5)	19.3 (66.7)	15.9 (60.6)	36.9 (98.4)
Mean daily maximum °C (°F)	6.9 (44.4)	7.8 (46.0)	9.9 (49.8)	12.5 (54.5)	15.4 (59.7)	18.0 (64.4)	20.2 (68.4)	19.9 (67.8)	17.4 (63.3)	13.5 (56.3)	9.7 (49.5)	7.1 (44.8)	13.2 (55.8)
Daily mean °C (°F)	4.1 (39.4)	4.6 (40.3)	6.2 (43.2)	8.3 (46.9)	10.9 (51.6)	13.6 (56.5)	15.8 (60.4)	15.6 (60.1)	13.3 (55.9)	10.0 (50.0)	6.6 (43.9)	4.2 (39.6)	9.5 (49.1)
Mean daily minimum °C (°F)	1.3 (34.3)	1.4 (34.5)	2.5 (36.5)	4.1 (39.4)	6.5 (43.7)	9.3 (48.7)	11.3 (52.3)	11.3 (52.3)	9.2 (48.6)	6.5 (43.7)	3.6 (38.5)	1.4 (34.5)	5.7 (42.3)
Record low °C (°F)	−16.9 (1.6)	−18.0 (−0.4)	−15.0 (5.0)	−11.1 (12.0)	−4.8 (23.4)	−0.8 (30.6)	1.4 (34.5)	0.0 (32.0)	−1.7 (28.9)	−5.3 (22.5)	−12.0 (10.4)	−16.4 (2.5)	−18.0 (−0.4)
Average precipitation mm (inches)	51.8 (2.04)	44.6 (1.76)	41.1 (1.62)	51.2 (2.02)	44.4 (1.75)	61.0 (2.40)	60.9 (2.40)	66.5 (2.62)	56.9 (2.24)	63.4 (2.50)	73.0 (2.87)	61.0 (2.40)	675.7 (26.60)
Average precipitation days (≥ 1.0 mm)	11.8	9.9	8.6	9.1	8.6	9.9	10.7	10.3	9.4	11.8	12.0	12.0	124.1
Mean monthly sunshine hours	60.9	84.4	121.7	160.8	187.1	167.1	174.3	167.3	135.3	98.9	64.6	57.6	1,480
Source 1: Met Office
Source 2: Durham Weather

Like the rest of the United Kingdom, Durham has a temperate climate. At 675.65 millimetres (27 in), the average annual rainfall is lower than the national average of 1,162.70 millimetres (46 in). Equally there are only an average of 124.14 days where more than 1 millimetre (0.04 in) of rain falls compared with a national average of 159.08 days. The city sees an average of 1479.95 hours of sunshine per year, compared with a national average of 1402.61 hours. There is frost on 46.81 days compared with a national average of 53.36 days. Average daily maximum and minimum temperatures are 13.20 and 5.71 °C (55.8 and 42.3 °F) compared with a national averages of 12.79 and 5.53 °C (55.0 and 42.0 °F) respectively.

Durham has the second longest weather record in England, with continuous daily records since August 1843. The coldest temperature recorded was in February 1895, falling to −18.0 °C (−0.4 °F), and the hottest was in July 2022, reaching 36.9 °C (98.4 °F), beating the previous record from July 2019 by 4.0 °C (39.2 °F). The wettest day since homogeneous rainfall records began in 1876 was in September 1976, with 87.8 millimetres (3.46 in) falling in 24 hours.

=== Demography ===
The county town of County Durham, until 2009, Durham was located in the City of Durham local government district. This extended beyond the city, and had a total population of 87,656 in 2001, covering 186.68 square kilometres in 2007. In 2001, the unparished area of Durham had a population of 29,091, whilst the built-up area of Durham had a population of 42,939. Many of the inner city areas are now inhabited by students living in shared housing.

== Governance ==
City of Durham Parish Council

Type
- Type: Parish Council

History
- Founded: 1 April 2018

Leadership
- Chairperson: Cllr Elizabeth Scott
- Clerk: Adam Shanley

Structure
- Seats: 15 Councillors
- Liberal Democrats: 10 / 15
- Labour Party: 4 / 15
- Independent: 1 / 15
- Green Party: 0 / 15

Elections
- Voting system: Plurality-at-large
- Last election: 1 May 2025
- Next election: 3 May 2029

Meeting place
- Millennium Pl, Durham

Website
- cityofdurham-pc.gov.uk

Durham Town Hall (Guildhall)

The ancient borough covering Durham was Durham and Framwelgate, which was reformed by the Municipal Corporations Act 1835. In 1974, it was merged with Durham Rural District and Brandon and Byshottles Urban District to form the City of Durham district of County Durham. The district was abolished in 2009 with its responsibilities assumed by Durham County Council, a unitary authority.

Since April 2009, city status has been held by charter trustees, who are the Durham county councillors for the area of the former district. The trustees appoint the Mayor of Durham. The creation of the new City of Durham Parish Council has not affected the charter trustees.

Durham's MP is Mary Foy of the Labour Party.

Durham Town Hall is located on the west side of the Market Place. The earliest part of the complex of buildings is the guildhall which dates from 1665. The town hall, at the rear, was opened in 1851 (at the same time as the indoor market, which extends beneath and either side of the hall).

A local referendum was held on creating a parish council for unparished areas of Durham City in February and March 2017, in which 66% of voters supported the proposal. The County Council approved the plans in September 2017. The City of Durham Parish Council was created on 1 April 2018, with the first elections for the 15 council seats taking place on 3 May 2018. The parish council is divided into three electoral wards, electing a total of 15 councillors. One in Aykley Heads, 6 in Elvet and Gilesgate and 8 in Nevilles Cross. These councillors are responsible for burial grounds, allotments, play areas and some street lighting. Elections to the parish council are held every four years and the most recent elections were held in May 2025.

== Economy ==
This is a table of trend of regional gross value added of County Durham at current basic prices (Note: With figures in millions of British Pounds Sterling.)

Year	Regional gross value added (Note: Components may not sum to totals due to rounding.)	Agriculture (Note: Includes hunting and forestry.)	Industry (Note: Includes energy and construction.)	Services (Note: Includes financial intermediation services indirectly measured.)
1995	4,063	47	1,755	2,261
2000	4,783	40	1,840	2,904
2003	5,314	39	1,978	3,297

== Landmarks ==
The whole of the centre of Durham is designated a conservation area. The conservation area was first designated on 9 August 1968, and was extended on 25 November 1980. In addition to the Cathedral and Castle, Durham contains more than 630 listed buildings, 569 of which are located within the city centre conservation area. Particularly notable properties include:

=== Grade I listed ===
- Chorister School
- Crook Hall
- Durham Castle
- Durham Cathedral
- Elvet Bridge
- Framwellgate Bridge
- Kepier Hospital
- Kingsgate Bridge
- Prebends Bridge

=== Grade II* listed ===
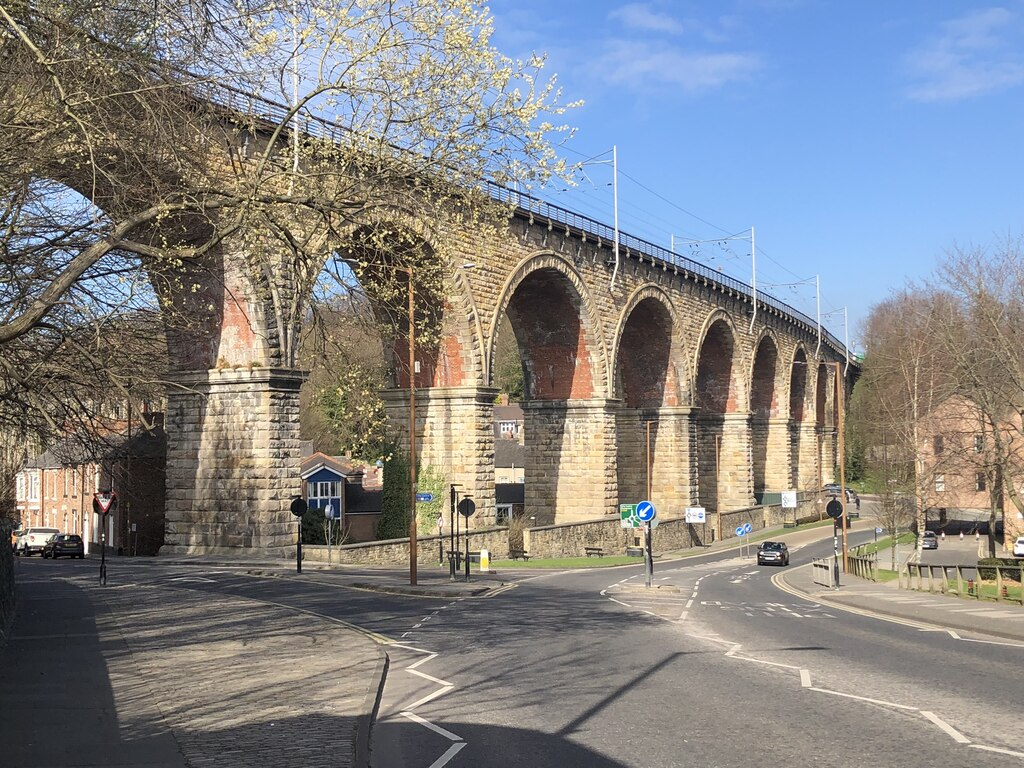
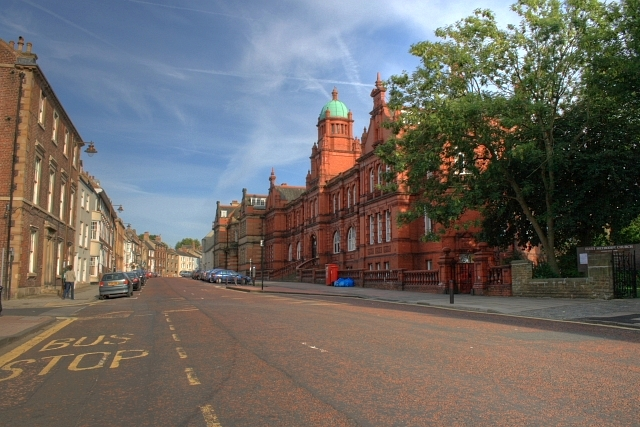
Cosin's Hall, the railway viaduct, and the Shire Hall
- St. Anne's Court, Castle Chare
- Aykley Heads House (now Durham City Register Office and Finbarr's Restaurant)
- Bishop Cosin's Hall, Palace Green
- Cosin's Library (now part of University Library, Palace Green)
- Crown Court, Old Elvet
- St Cuthbert's Society, 12 South Bailey
- St John's College, 3 South Bailey
- Railway viaduct, North Road
- Town Hall and Guildhall, Market Place
- Old Shire Hall, Old Elvet

=== Grade II listed ===
Durham has multiple grade II listed buildings, including:

- University Observatory
- The Chapel of the College of St Hild and St Bede
- The Victoria, a public house at 86 Hallgarth Street
- Redhills, the headquarters building of the Durham Miners' Association.
- Durham police mast, currently dismantled, at the Durham Constabulary headquarters.

=== Durham Castle ===
Durham Castle, view from the central tower of the cathedral

The castle was originally built in the 11th century as a projection of the Norman power in Northern England, as the population of England in the north remained rebellious following the disruption of the Norman Conquest in 1066. It is an excellent example of the early motte and bailey castles favoured by the Normans. The holder of the office of Bishop of Durham was appointed by the King to exercise royal authority on his behalf and the castle was the centre of his command.

It remained the Bishop's Palace for the Bishops of Durham until the Bishop William Van Mildert made Bishop Auckland their primary residence. A founder of Durham University, Van Mildert gave the castle as accommodation for the institution's first college, University College. The castle was famed for its vast Great Hall, created by Bishop Antony Bek in the early 14th century. It was the largest great hall in Britain until Bishop Richard Foxe shortened it at the end of the 15th century. However, it is still 46 feet high and more than 33 yards long. The castle is still the home of University College, Durham (which is, as a result, known informally as "Castle"). It has been in continuous use for more than 900 years.

=== Religious buildings ===
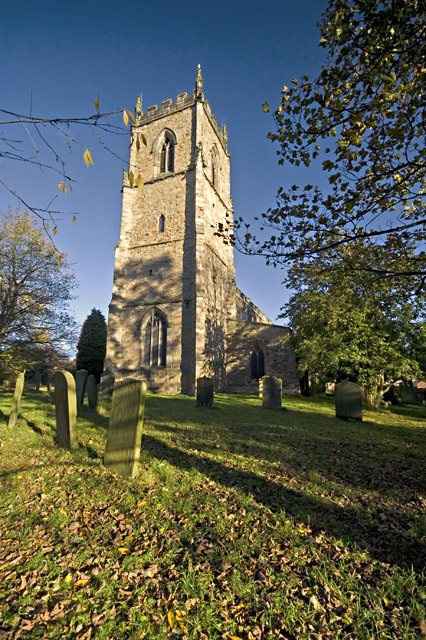
St Oswald's, St. Nicholas and Durham Cathedral

The Cathedral Church of Christ, Blessed Mary the Virgin and St Cuthbert of Durham, commonly referred to as Durham Cathedral was founded in its present form in AD 1093 and remains a centre for Christian worship today. It is generally regarded as one of the finest Romanesque cathedrals in Europe and the rib vaulting in the nave marks the beginning of Gothic ecclesiastical architecture. The cathedral has been designated a UNESCO World Heritage Site along with nearby Durham Castle, which faces it across Palace Green, high above the River Wear.

The cathedral houses the shrine and related treasures of Cuthbert of Lindisfarne, and these are on public view. It is also home to the head of St Oswald of Northumbria and the remains of the Venerable Bede.

The city also has other listed churches, some have been repurposed:

- Grade I listed
  - St Giles, Gilesgate
  - St Margaret of Antioch, Crossgate
  - St Mary-le-Bow (now Durham Heritage Centre)
- St Oswald's, grade II* listed
- Grade II listed
  - St. Cuthbert's (Catholic)
  - St. Nicholas

== Education ==
Results relate to the 2008 examination series.

=== Primary ===
Primary schools include:

- Shincliffe
- Finchale
- Framwellgate Moor
- Durham Blue Coat Junior
- Newton Hall Infants
- Durham Gilesgate
- St Joseph's RCVA
- St Godric's RC
- St Margaret's CofE
- St Oswald's CofE
- Nevilles Cross
- St Hild's College CE Aided

=== Secondary ===
Durham is served by four state secondary schools:

School	GCSE Results (percentage A* to C)	A/AS Average points
Belmont School Community and Arts College	48%	N/A
Durham Johnston Comprehensive School	89%	853.1
Framwellgate School Durham	77%	645.8
St Leonard's Catholic School	65%	751

=== College or sixth form ===
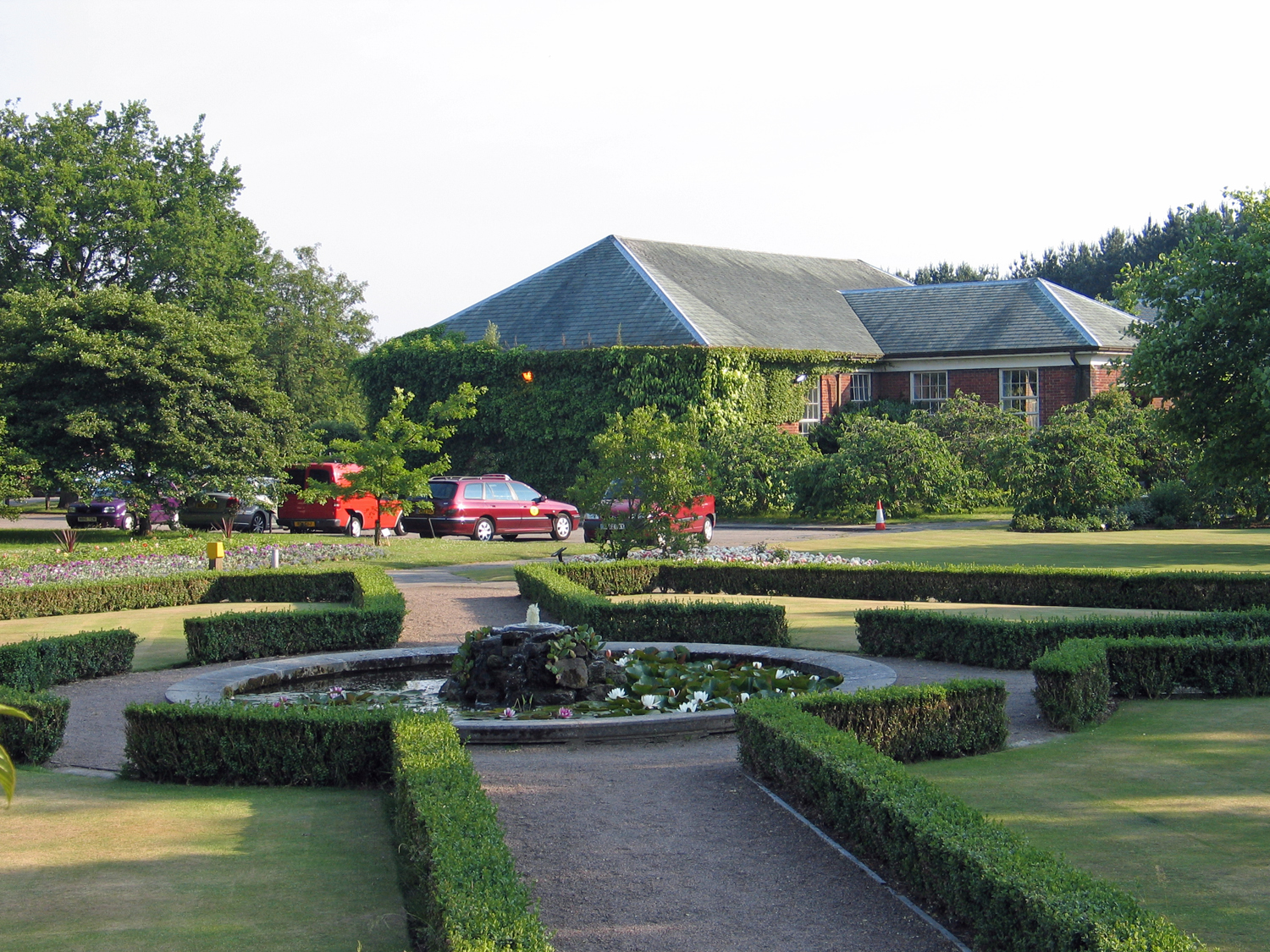
East Durham College, Houghall campus

New College Durham is the city's largest college of further education. It was founded in 1977 as a result of a merger between Neville's Cross College of Education and Durham Technical College. The college operated on two main sites near the city of Durham: Neville's Cross and Framwellgate Moor. The site at Framwellgate Moor opened in 1957 and has subsequently been rebuilt. The Neville's Cross centre is now home to Ustinov College, the postgraduate college of Durham University.

Durham Sixth Form Centre specialises in sixth form courses, while East Durham College has a campus specialising in land-based education at Houghall on the eastern outskirts of the city.

==== Independent ====
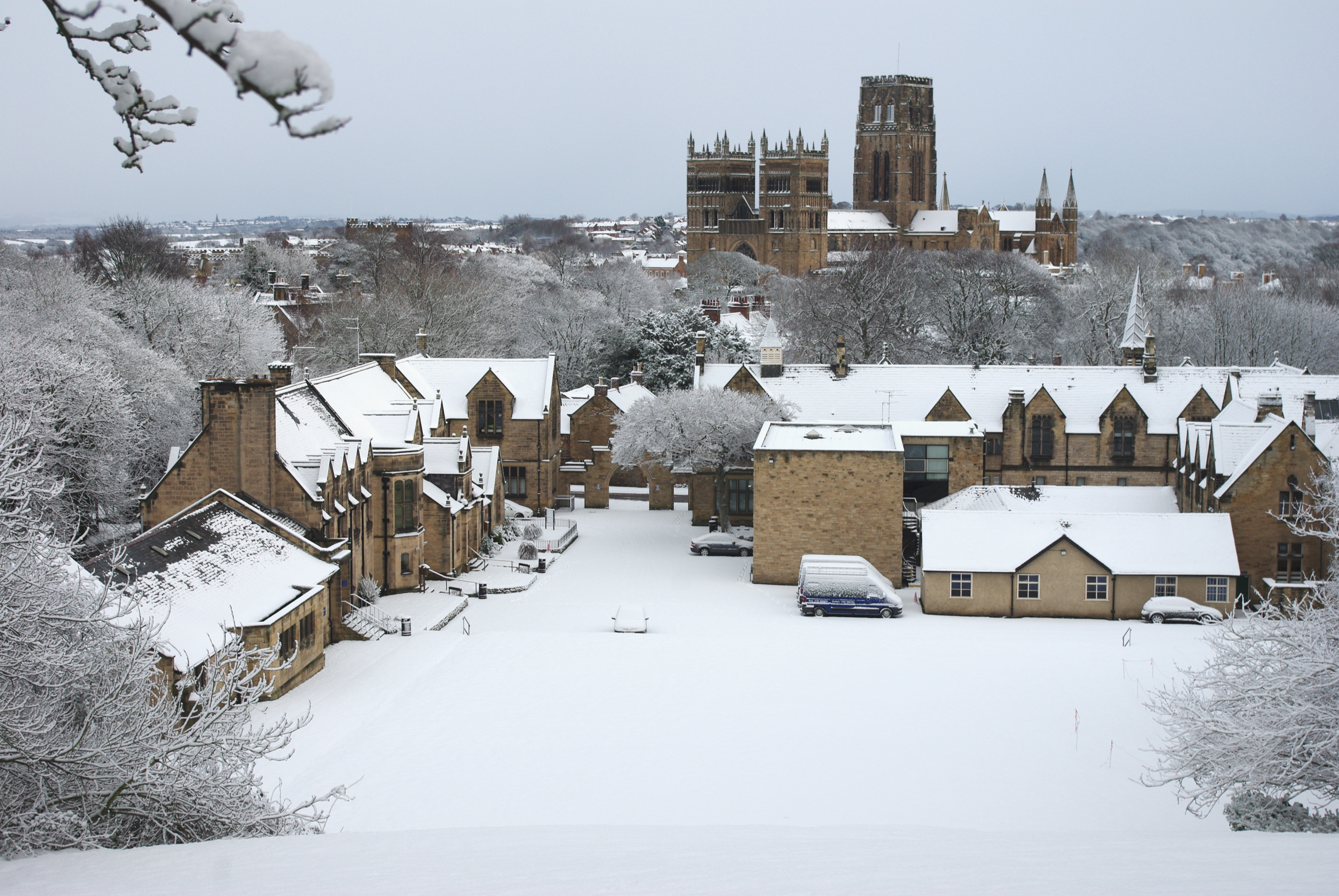
Durham School with Durham Cathedral in the background, January 2010

There are two independent schools:

School	GCSE Results (percentage A* to C)	A/AS Average points
Durham High School for Girls	98%	854.8
Durham School	76%	807.1

=== University ===
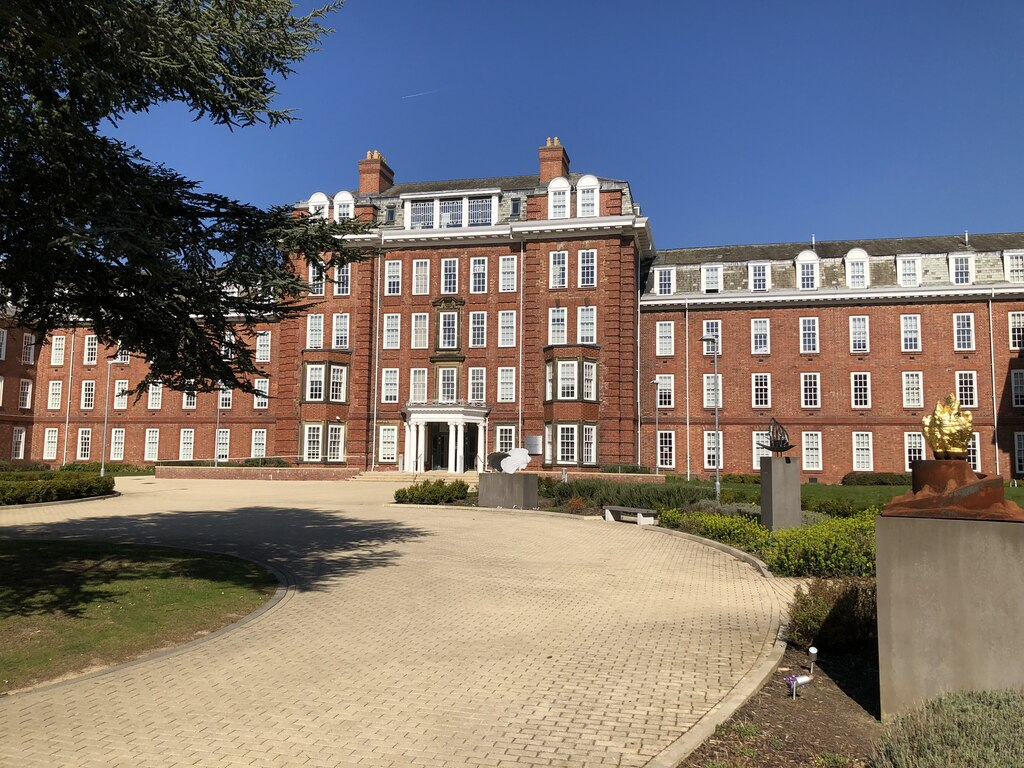
Sheraton Hall used by Ustinov College

The city is home to Durham University. It was founded as the University of Durham (which remains its official and legal name) by Act of Parliament in 1832 and granted a Royal Charter in 1837. It was one of the first universities to open in England for more than 600 years, and is claimed to be England's third oldest after the Universities of Oxford and Cambridge. Durham University has an international reputation for excellence, as reflected by its ranking in the top 200 of the world's universities.

== Healthcare ==
Healthcare in Durham, from 2013 to July 2022, was the responsibility of NHS Durham Dales, Easington and Sedgefield, and Sunderland and South Tyneside clinical commissioning groups. In July 2019 they proposed to merge into two, one covering Durham, and the other covering Tees Valley and including Darlington.

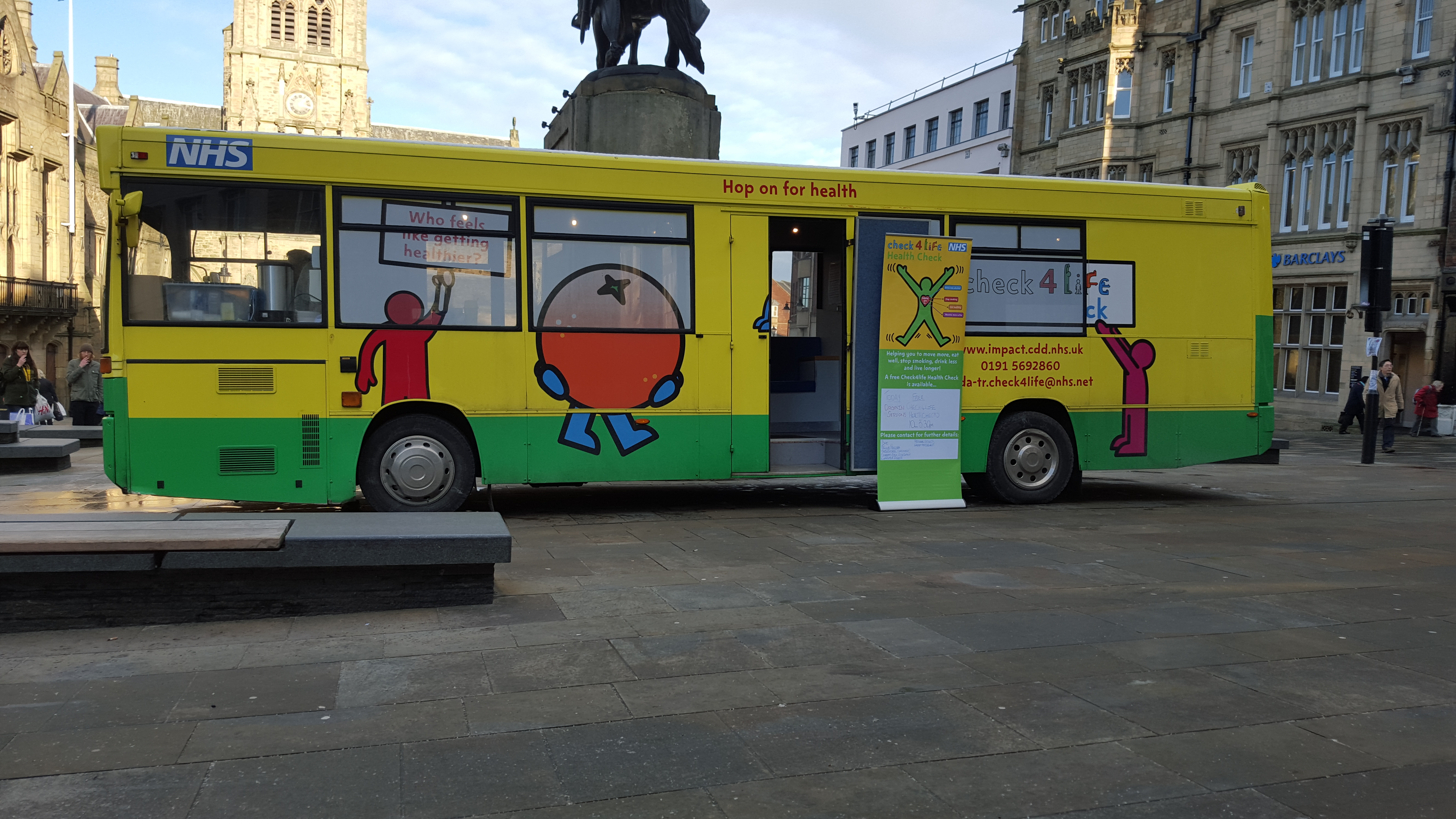
Health bus in Durham Market Place

== Local media ==
The city's local radio stations are Durham On Air, Purple Radio which broadcasts from Durham University and Durham Hospitals Radio which has been broadcasting from the University Hospital of North Durham (previously Dryburn Hospital) since 1963.

== Transport ==
=== Railway ===
The northbound platform at Durham station

Durham railway station is a stop on the East Coast Main Line between Edinburgh Waverley and London King's Cross. From the south, trains enter Durham over a Victorian viaduct, high above the city.

The station is served by four train operating companies:

- London North Eastern Railway operates services between London Kings Cross, York, Darlington, Newcastle and Edinburgh Waverley
- TransPennine Express provides services between Liverpool Lime Street, Manchester Piccadilly, Leeds, York and Newcastle
- CrossCountry operates long-distance services between Plymouth, Bristol Temple Meads, Birmingham New Street, Derby, Sheffield, York and Edinburgh Waverley
- Northern Trains runs a limited service in early mornings and evenings; destinations include Newcastle, Carlisle and Darlington.

A second station, Durham Elvet, also served the city. It opened in 1893, closing to passenger services in 1931 and to goods trains in 1954.

=== Road ===
By road, the A1(M), the modern incarnation of the ancient Great North Road, passes just to the east of the city. The road's previous incarnation, now numbered A167, passes just to the west.

Durham market place and its peninsula form the UK's first (albeit small) congestion charging area, which was introduced in 2002.

=== Buses ===
The city is served by Arriva North East and Go North East's local bus services, with routes running in and around the North East England region including to Bishop Auckland, Darlington and Sunderland.

==== Bus station ====
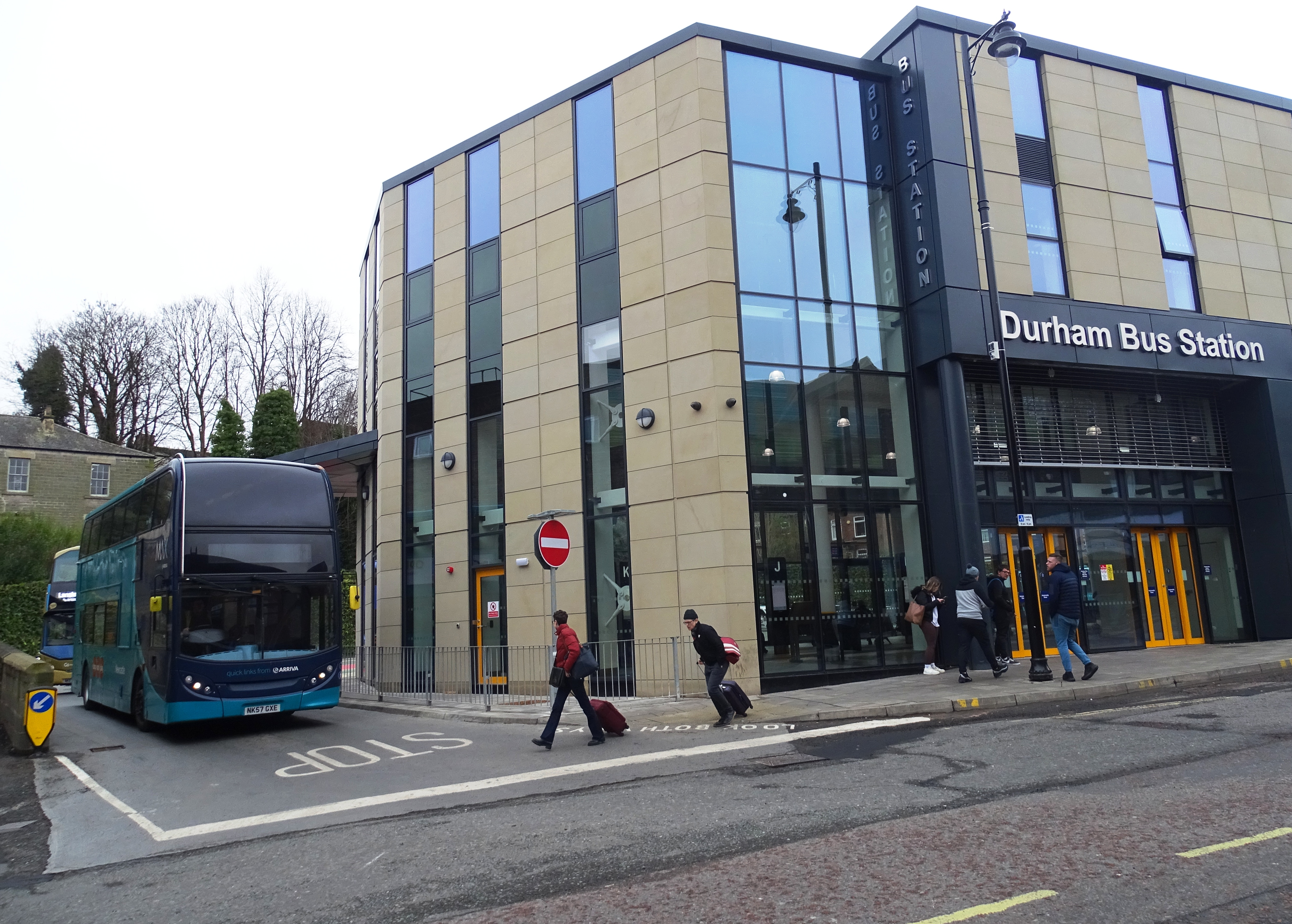
The new bus station

Durham bus station was located off North Road, a short walk from the cathedral, university and railway station; it was managed and owned by the county council. In February 2021, it was demolished to make way for a £10m redevelopment and originally was planned to reopen in Summer 2023 before being twice delayed to November 2023 and January 2024, when it finally reopened. During the time of the closure, scheduled buses ran from temporary stands on North Road and Milburngate.

The current bus station has increased space for passengers and new facilities including toilets, a changing places unit, improved information displays and additional seating in the passenger waiting area.

==== Park and Ride ====
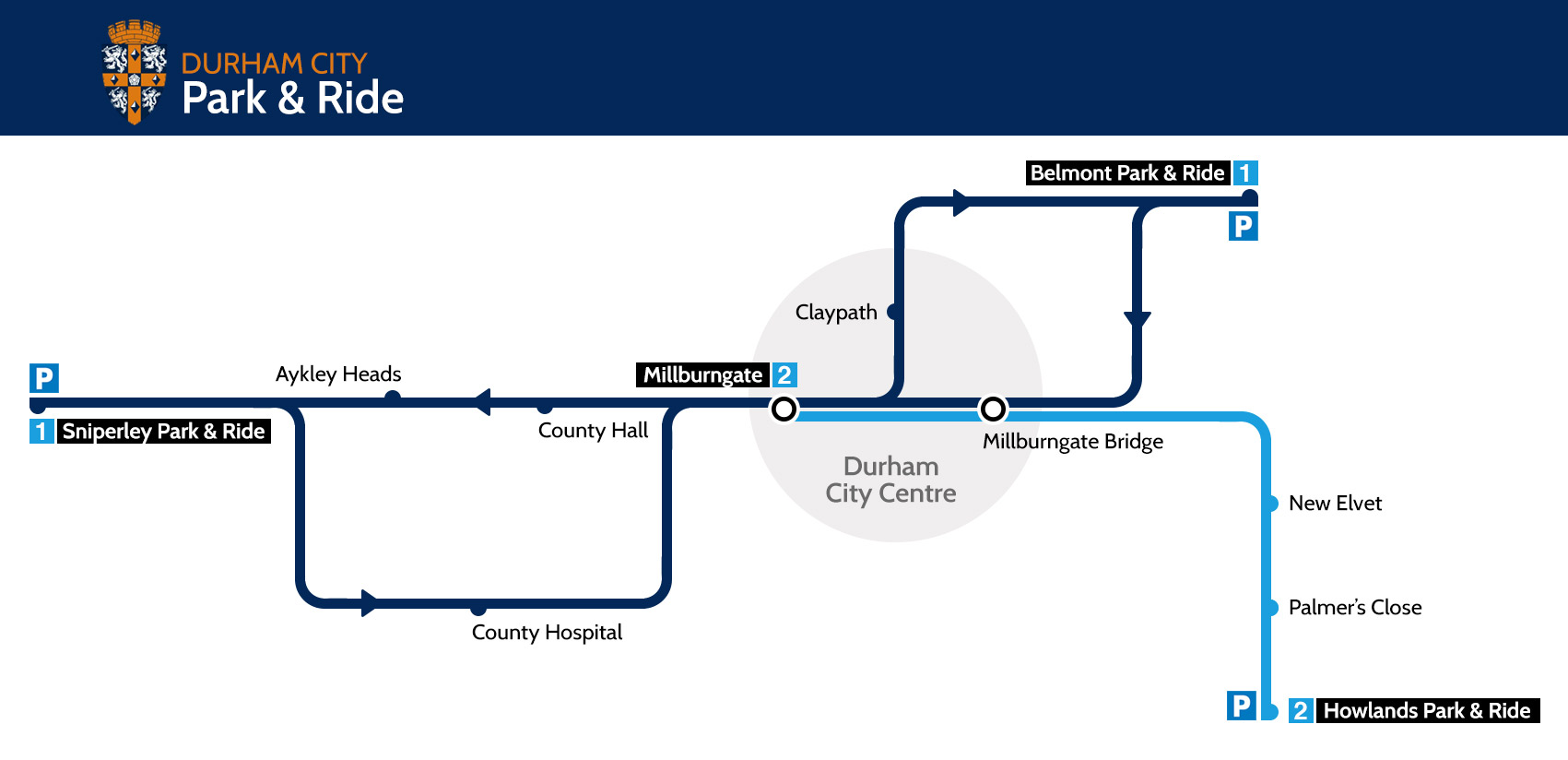
Durham City park and ride map

Durham City park and ride consists of three sites (Belmont, Howlands and Sniperley), which are located around the outskirts of the city centre. The Belmont site is closest to the A1(M). Frequent, direct bus services operate up to every 10 minutes between 7am and 7pm (Monday–Saturday). Car parking is free, with a return bus journey costing £2 per person (as of June 2020).

=== Air ===
Durham's nearest airports are at Teesside, within the county to the south-east, and Newcastle to the north; both are located 25–30 miles (40–48 km) from the city by road.

== Sport ==
=== Archery ===
Durham hosts several archery clubs who shoot at various locations in the city, members of these clubs shoot for the region and individually at national events, as well as many who shoot for recreation. In 2014, the regional Durham And Northumberland Archery Team won the National Intercounty Team Event at Lilleshall NSC, this event saw 260 archers from 19 counties competing over two days for the title.

=== Cricket ===
Durham City Cricket Club plays at Green Lane Cricket Ground near the River Wear. Formed in 1829, Durham City was one of the founder members of the Durham Senior Cricket League upon its creation in 1903 and the First XI have been champions on thirteen occasions.

=== Football ===
The town's football club Durham City A.F.C. was a member the Football League between 1921 and 1928, but has long been a non-league club, currently playing in the Northern League. Their home ground was New Ferens Park. However, after a dispute with the landlord, Durham left New Ferens Park and made a deal to groundshare at Willington F.C.

Durham is also home to FA Women's Championship team Durham Women's F.C., a team founded in 2014, they are a collaboration between South Durham and Cestria Girls and Durham University, the team are nicknamed The Wildcats, who are coached by Lee Sanders and play their Home games at Maiden Castle, part of Durham University.

=== Hockey ===
Durham has two hockey clubs that compete in the Men's England Hockey League, the Women's England Hockey League, the North Hockey League, the Yorkshire Hockey Association League and the BUCS leagues. These are Durham City Hockey Club and Durham University Hockey Club.

=== Ice ===
Durham Ice Rink was a central feature of the city for some 60 years until it closed in 1996. It was home to the Durham Wasps, one of the most successful British ice hockey clubs that competed in the British Hockey League during the 1980s and early 1990s. Durham City Wasps was another club that disbanded following the closure of Durham Ice Rink.

Durham Ice Rink's demolition began in May 2013. On the location of the former ice rink now stands Freemans Reach which houses the Durham Passport Office

Durham Dragons play some fixutures at Billingham Forum.

=== Rowing ===
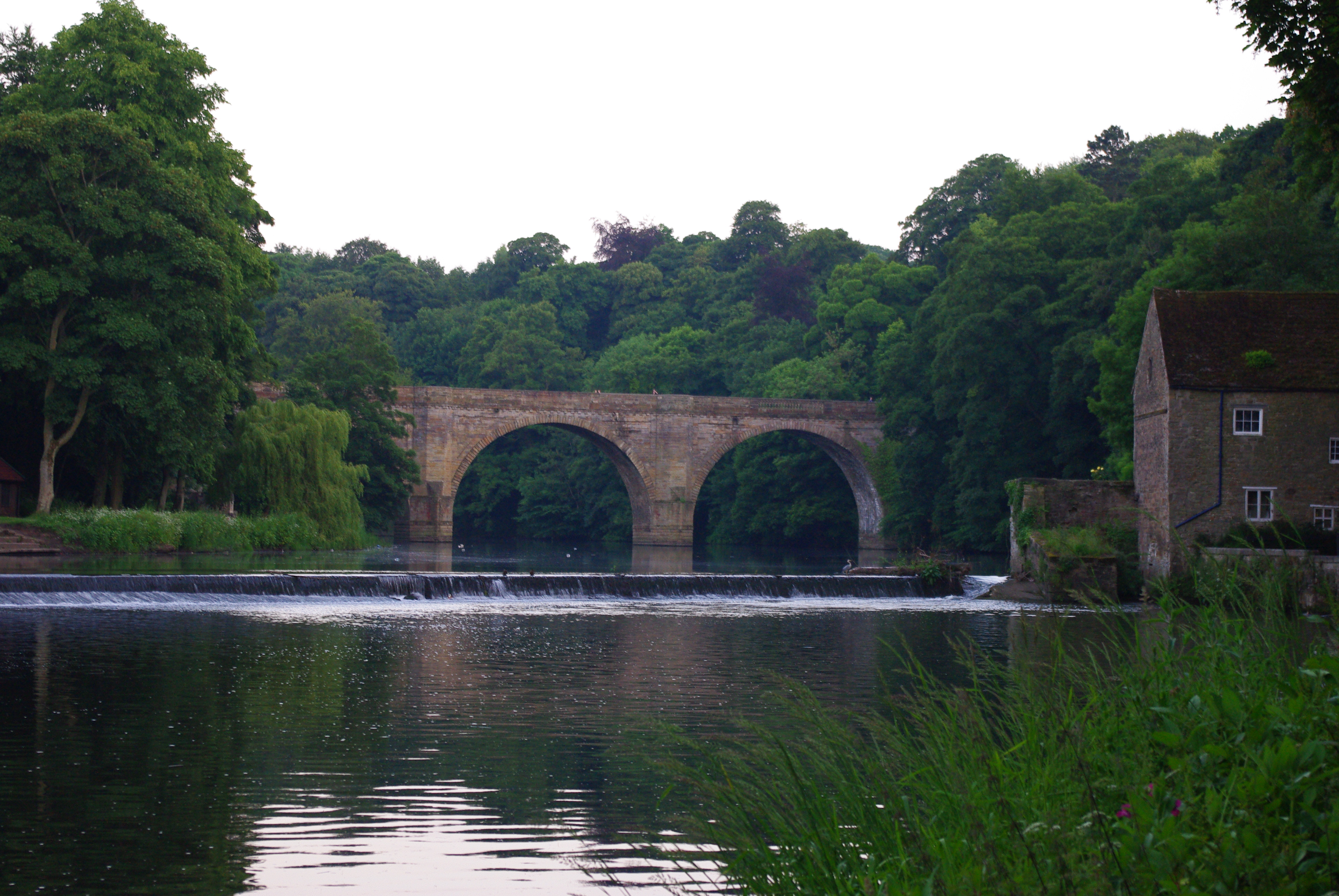
Prebends Bridge and the weir marking the end of the stretch available for rowing

The River Wear provides more than 2 kilometres (1.2 miles) of river that can be rowed on, stretching from Durham University Boat Club's boathouse at Maiden Castle in the east to the weir next to Durham School Boat Club's boathouse in the west. This includes the 700 metres (770 yd) 'short course' straight used for most Durham Regatta races, the 1,800 metres (2,000 yd) 'long course' that includes navigation through the arches of Elvet Bridge, reputed to be the narrowest row through bridge in Europe, and 1,000 metres (1,100 yd) and 2,000 metres (2,200 yd) measured distances. There is a path running alongside the river's south bank (i.e. the Cathedral side) for the entire length of the stretch available for rowing, the concrete section between Hatfield College boathouse and Elvet Bridge being completed in 1882.

For sport rowing there are a number of boating clubs operating on this stretch, Durham Amateur Rowing Club, Durham University Boat Club, the 16 college clubs of the university, Durham Constabulary and the school clubs – Durham School Boat Club and St Leonard's who row regularly in their own colours out of their own boathouses and Durham High School for Girls who may row out of Durham Amateur Rowing Club.

==== Durham Amateur Rowing Club ====
Durham Amateur Rowing Club, DARC, operates out of a purpose-built community clubhouse on the River Wear which opened in 2007:

Durham Amateur Rowing Club is one of the country's oldest clubs (founded in 1860) and lies at the end of Green Lane in Durham, occupying a tranquil setting on the River Wear.

The club takes part in the government scheme playing for success where it uses sport to combine rowing, science, computers and video to help boost literacy and numeracy.

==== University rowing ====
University rowing is divided into two sections: Durham University Boat Club and Durham College Rowing; the latter comprises 16 college boat clubs.

==== Regattas and head races ====
The River Wear is host to a number of regattas and head races throughout the year. These include: the Novice Cup, Wear Long Distance Sculls and Senate Cup in November and December; Durham Small Boats Head in February; Durham City Regatta in May; Durham Regatta and Admiral's Regatta in June; and Durham Primary Regatta in September.

===== Durham Regatta =====
Durham Regatta has been held on the River Wear in Durham since 1834. It is the second oldest regatta in Britain and is often referred to as "the Henley of the North'. Durham Regatta dates back to 1834, originally with only a handful of trophies being competed for during a three-day period. In its current form, the regatta takes place over two days, when dozens of trophies are competed for. Durham University, Durham School and Durham Amateur Rowing Club have competed regularly since the early days.

==== Pleasure boats ====
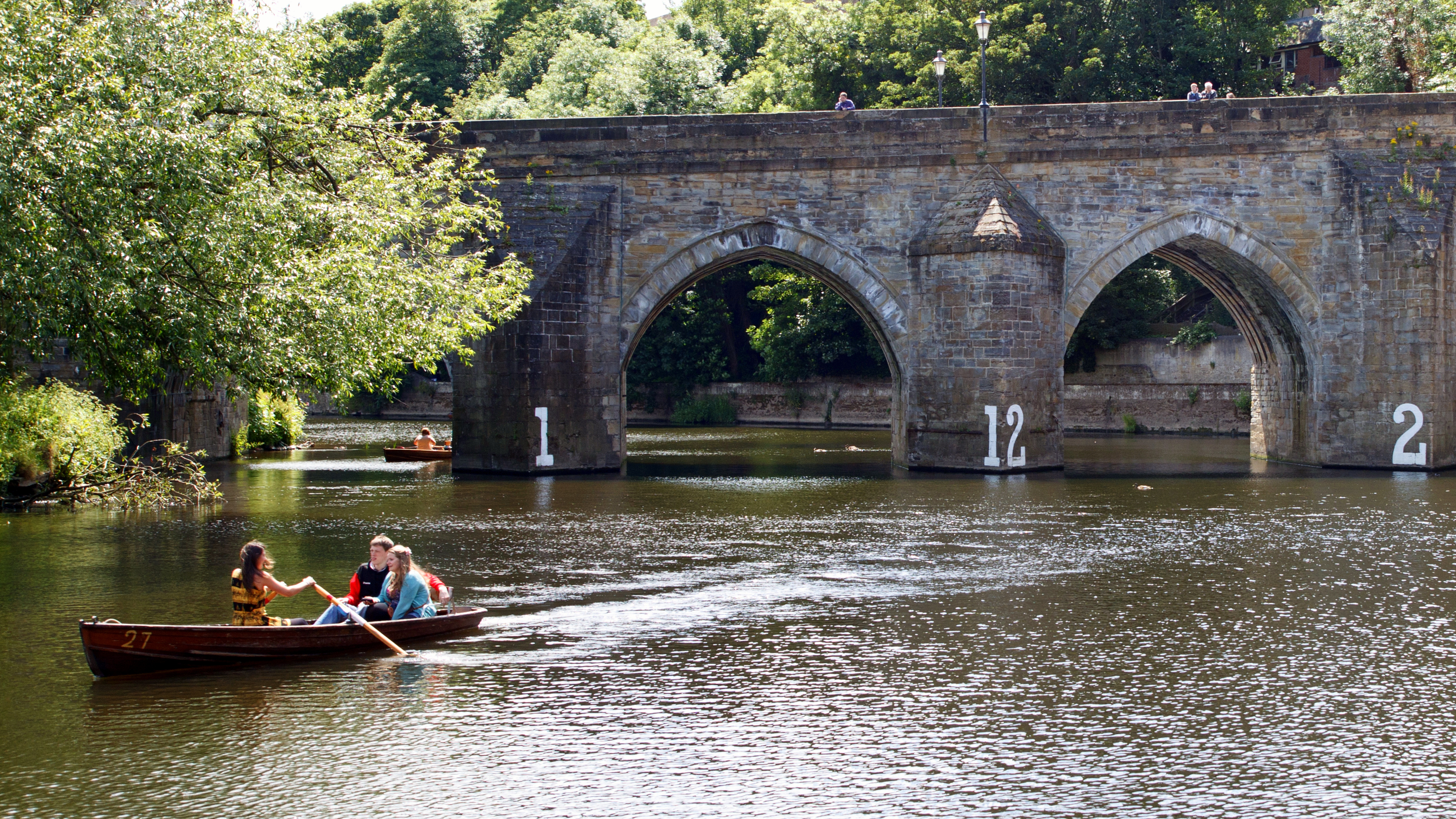
Pleasure boats and tour boats on the River Wear in Durham

In addition to the competitive rowing and sculling of the boat clubs mentioned above, there is also hire of public pleasure boats from April to October.

=== Rugby ===
Durham City Rugby Club has its headquarters on Green Lane; the second oldest club in the county was founded in 1872, with navy and gold playing colours and Durham Cathedral's sanctuary knocker as the club's crest. City's Hollow Drift home has been developed into a facility which includes two floodlit pitches and a training area.

At present, City run four senior sides, a Veteran's XV, a Ladies' XV and mini and junior teams from aged 6 to 17.

== Notable people ==
- Pat Barker, (born in Thornaby in 1943), novelist ('Regeneration' trilogy), now resident in Durham.
- Barnabe Barnes, (baptised 1571, died 1609), Elizabethan poet. Died in Durham.
- Henry Blackett (c. 1820–1907), New Zealand storekeeper and politician, born in Durham.
- Sir Tony Blair, (born 1953) former Prime Minister of the United Kingdom. Attended the Chorister School 1961–1966.
- Count Joseph Boruwlaski (1739–1837), dwarf, spent last years of his life in Durham.
- Rev. Edward Bradley (1827–1889). Studied at Durham University and took his pen name "Cuthbert Bede" from the names of the city's two saints.
- Richard Caddel (1949–2003), poet. Lived in Durham from the 1970s and was co-director of the Basil Bunting poetry centre at Durham University library from 1988.
- George Camsell (1902–1966), international footballer, born in Framwellgate Moor.
- Thomas Carr (engineer) (1824-1874), inventor of the Carr's disintegrator.
- Paul Collingwood (born 1976), international cricketer. Born in Shotley Bridge, now resident in Durham.
- Sir Kingsley Dunham (1910–2001), Professor of Geology and later Professor Emeritus at the University of Durham, director of the British Geological Survey from 1967 to 1975.
- John Bacchus Dykes (1823–1876), hymnologist, clergyman in Durham from 1849 to his death.
- John Meade Falkner (1858–1932), arms manufacturer and novelist. Lived in Durham from 1902, and became Honorary Reader in Paleography at the University of Durham, and Honorary Librarian to the Dean and Chapter Library of Durham Cathedral.
- James Fenton (born 1949), journalist and poet. Attended the Chorister School 1957–1962.
- Max Ferguson (born 1924), Canadian broadcaster, born in Durham.
- John Garth (1721–1810), composer. Lived in Durham for much of his life.
- Archie Gray (born 2006), midfielder and right-back for Leeds United, England U20 team.
- Godric of Finchale (c. 1065–1170), popular medieval saint, briefly served as doorkeeper at St Giles Hospital in Durham before becoming a hermit.
- Andy Gomarsall (born 1974), International rugby union player. Born in Durham.
- John Gully (1783–1863), prize fighter, racehorse owner and politician. Resident in Durham at time of his death.
- Trevor Horn (born 1949), record producer and member of the Buggles and Art Of Noise.
- Sir John Grant McKenzie Laws, Lord Justice Laws, judge (attended the Chorister School)
- Jane Porter, novelist
- Granville Sharp, abolitionist
- John Tindale, former cricketer
- Henry Baker Tristram FRS (1822–1906), clergyman and ornithologist died in Durham.
- Sir Peter Vardy, businessman (attended the Chorister School)
- Sir Hugh Walpole, novelist
- James Wood, literary critic

== Twin towns ==
Durham has a number of twin towns:

- Durham, North Carolina - United States
- Durham, Connecticut - United States
- Durham, New Hampshire - United States
- Tübingen - Germany
- Kreis Wesel - Germany
- Department of the Somme - France
- Banská Bystrica - Slovakia
- Nakskov - Denmark
- Alcalá de Guadaíra - Spain
- Jászberény - Hungary

Following the 2022 Russian invasion of Ukraine, Durham County council revoked the twinning arrangements with the Russian city of Kostroma, which had been in place since 1968.

== Freedom of the City ==
The following people and military units have received the Freedom of the City of Durham.

=== Individuals ===
- Sir Bobby Robson
- Archbishop Desmond Tutu

=== Military units ===
- 607 Squadron, RAF: 6 December 2017
