= Framwellgate School Durham =

Academy in Durham, England

Location
- Newton Drive; Framwellgate Moor, Durham, County Durham, DH1 5BQ; England; 54.79727°N 1.58525°W

Information
- Type: Academy
- Motto: Excellence, compassion and respect for all
- Established: 1965
- Department for Education URN: 137696 Tables
- Ofsted: Reports
- Chair of governors: K. Cromarty
- Head teacher: Michael Wright
- Gender: Mixed
- Age: 11 to 18
- Enrolment: 1234
- Colours: Grey and navy
- Former Name: Framwellgate Moor Comprehensive School
- Former Colours: Blue, black and gold
- School Animal: Eagle (Bird)
- Website: http://www.framdurham.com

Framwellgate School Durham is a large state secondary school and sixth form centre located in the Framwellgate Moor area of Durham City, County Durham, England. It was granted academy status in 2011.

== Composition ==
At the time of its most recent inspection in November, 2024, the school had approximately 1280 pupils, of which around 135 were in the sixth form.

The school serves Framwellgate Moor and the nearby Newton Hall estate. However, some pupils travel greater distances, typically from outlying former pit villages.

In the last two Ofsted reports, in July 2021 and November 2024, the school was graded as 'Good' and in the 2024 report this was updated to mostly 'Good' with some elements that 'Require Improvement' under the new assessment scheme

== History ==
The first school buildings were opened in 1965, with most of the other blocks following over the next decade. The school operated as a comprehensive since 1971.

The school was formerly known as Framwellgate Moor Comprehensive School, and was commonly known by the initials FMCS.

The school was granted Specialist Science College status in 2003.

In 2011 the school was granted independent academy status as part of the UK Conservative government's "Big Society" education plans. This meant that the school gained greater control over its education and teaching, though it remains state-run.

In 2016, the school was granted £2m funding to build a new sports centre to replace the former one; the building was completed in September 2017.

== Performance ==
In 2007, 77% of pupils taking GCSEs achieved 5 or more at grade C or above. In the sixth form in the same year, the average level 3 point score was 607 per student.

The school received an 'Outstanding', grade 1 for the Ofsted inspection that took place in October 2005.

In the 2008 Ofsted report the school received a 'Good', grade 2.

The Ofsted report of July 2021 rated the school as 'Good' and the most recent report in November 2024 this was updated to mostly 'Good' with some elements that 'Require Improvement'

== Notable former pupils ==
- David Duke, former Swindon Town and Darlington footballer
- Tony Hackworth, former Leeds United footballer
- Andy Rafferty, current Hartlepool United footballer
- Mark Summerbell, former Middlesbrough footballer
- Craig Tracey, British Conservative Party MP
- Rachel Sweeney, television presenter for GB News
