= Healthcare in Durham =

Healthcare services

Healthcare in Durham, from 2013 to July 2022, was the responsibility of NHS Durham Dales, Easington and Sedgefield, and Sunderland and South Tyneside clinical commissioning groups. In July 2019 they proposed to merge into two, one covering Durham, and the other covering Tees Valley and including Darlington.

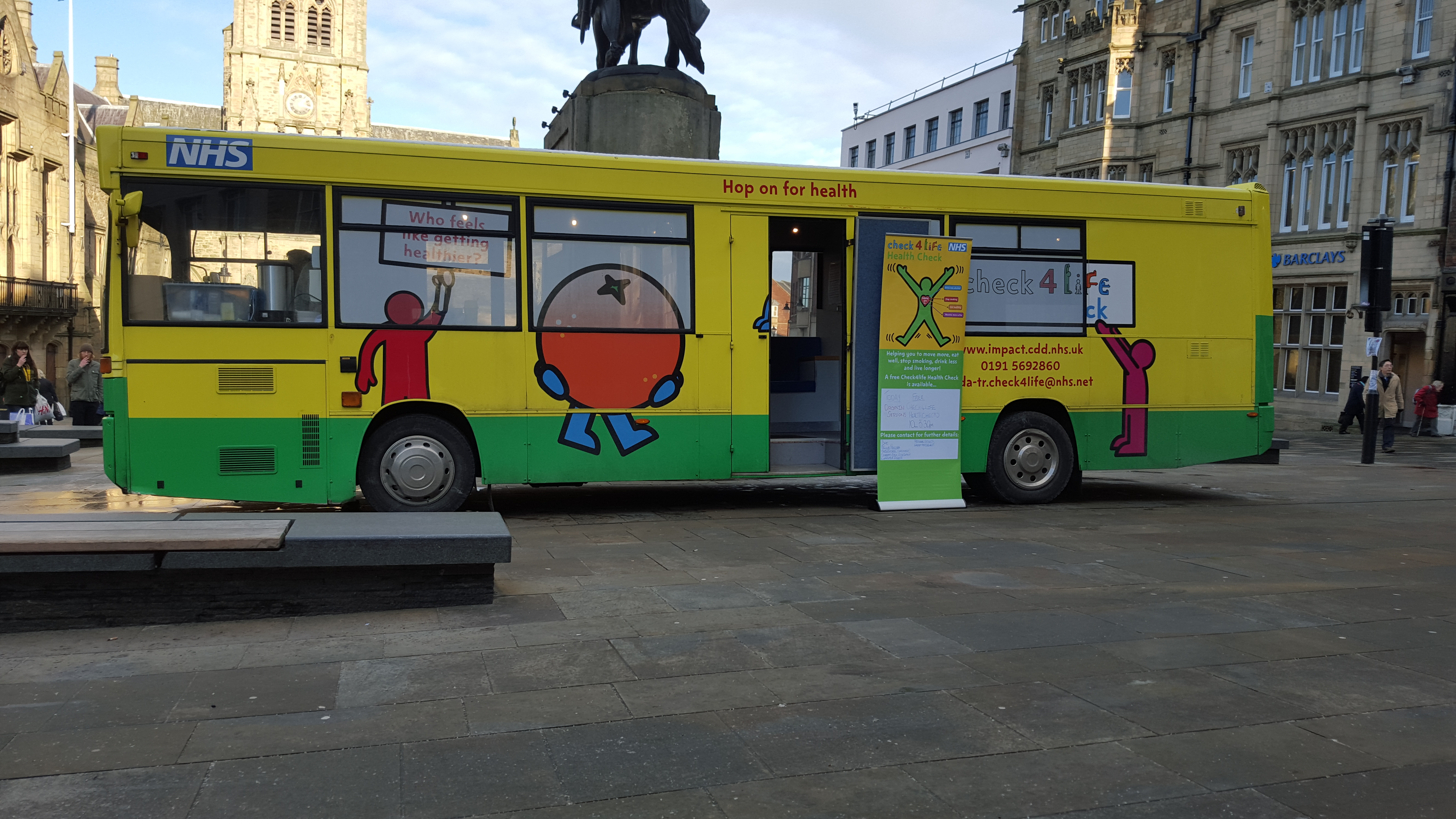
Health bus in Durham Market Place

== History ==
From 1947 to 1974 NHS services in Durham were managed by Newcastle Regional Hospital Board. In 1974 the boards were abolished and replaced by regional health authorities. Durham came under the Northern RHA. Regions were reorganised in 1996 and Durham came under the Northern and Yorkshire Regional Health Authority. Durham from 1974 had one district health authority, but in 1992 was divided into two, North and South. Five primary care trusts: Derwentside, Durham and Chester-le-Street, Durham Dales, Easington and Sedgefield, were established covering the whole the county in 2002, but in 2006 the first five were amalgamated into County Durham PCT. They were managed by the North East Strategic Health Authority from 2002 until 2013. For NHS purposes Darlington has generally been treated as part of Durham, not with the rest of Yorkshire.

The CCGs took on the responsibilities of the former PCTs on 1 April 2013 and were replaced with integrated care systems in 2022.

== Sustainability and transformation plans ==
Durham, Darlington and Tees, Hambleton, Richmondshire and Whitby formed a sustainability and transformation plan area in March 2016 with Alan Foster the Chief Executive of North Tees and Hartlepool NHS Foundation Trust as its leader. The plan proposed to tackle the projected 2020/21 deficit of £260 million, with efficiency savings mostly coming from the reconfiguration of hospital services (£110.7 million).

== Primary care ==
Out-of-hours services are provided by County Durham and Darlington NHS Foundation Trust.

Walk-in centres in North Ormesby and Eston were closed in 2017 and replaced by the South Tees Access Response service, run by ELM Alliance Ltd, an alliance of local GPs, which offered late night and weekend appointments at four GP surgeries.

== Mental health providers ==
Mental health services in the county are provided by Tees, Esk and Wear Valleys NHS Foundation Trust.

== Hospital services ==
Acute hospital services are provided by North Tees and Hartlepool NHS Foundation Trust, County Durham and Darlington NHS Foundation Trust, and South Tyneside and Sunderland NHS Foundation Trust, which was building a new diagnostic and treatment centre in Durham in 2017. The North East Ambulance Service covers the county.

Sunderland and South Tyneside clinical commissioning groups decided in February 2018 to centralise hospital-based stroke, maternity, gynaecology and paediatric services at Sunderland Royal Hospital, so the services at South Tyneside District Hospital will be closed or downgraded. A 14-hour-a-day, nurse-led paediatric minor injuries and illnesses service at South Tyneside was to be established in their place.
