= South Street (Durham) =

Affluent residential street in Durham, England

Coordinates: 54.774081°N 1.580222°W

South Street is an affluent residential street in Durham, England, on the banks of the River Wear. It overlooks the Durham Cathedral, a UNESCO World Heritage Site, and Durham Castle. It is best known for its terraced houses, many of which are Grade II listed buildings built in the Tudor Revival architecture and architecture of the modern era.

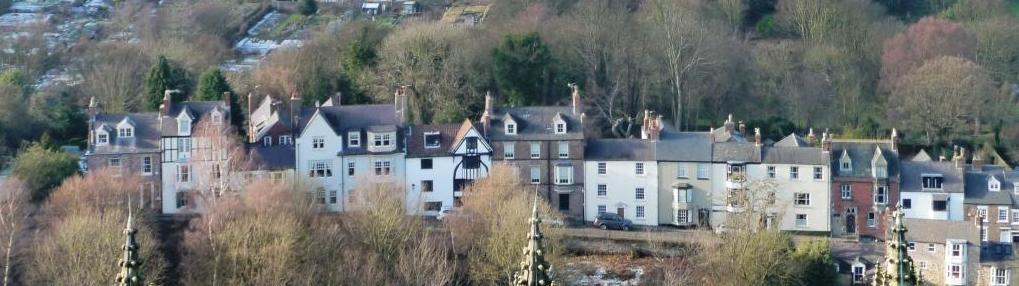
View of South Street from atop the Durham Cathedral.

The street is situated in a conservation area and runs 0.5 km from Pimlico near Durham School to the Church of St Margaret of Antioch and Framwellgate Bridge. It is in walking distance from the Durham city centre.

== History ==
Sir Walter Scott was so inspired by the South Street view of the Durham Cathedral that he wrote "Harold the Dauntless," a poem about Saxons and Vikings set in County Durham and published in 1817. The following lines from the poem are engraved into nearby Prebends Bridge:

Grey towers of Durham
Yet well I love thy mixed and massive piles
Half church of God, half castle 'gainst the Scot
And long to roam those venerable aisles

With records stored of deeds long since forgot.
