= Kepier Haughs =

Sports venue in the UK

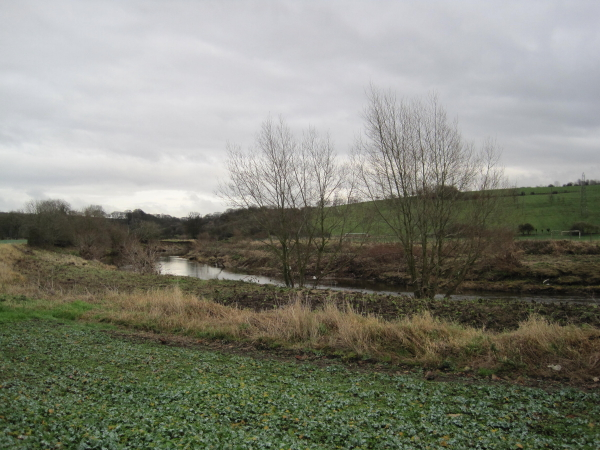
- Kepier Haughs is on the far side of the river in this image.
- Interactive map of Kepier Haughs
- Location: Durham, England
- Coordinates: 54.7872°N 1.5611°W
- Surface: Grass
- Record attendance: 7,886

Construction
- Opened: 1920
- Closed: 1923

Tenant
- Durham City

Kepier Haughs is a haugh located to the north of Kepier Hospital in Durham, England. It has been used as a rifle range and a sports field, as well as hosting a brick works. It was the home ground of Durham City football club between 1920 and 1923.

== History ==
The land originally belonged to the Kepier Hospital, and on the dissolution of the monasteries, it was transferred to William Paget and John Cockburn, who sold it to John Heath in 1555. The land subsequently changed hands a few times, with mining works being established in 1822 and 1872.

The site housed a brick works, which remained in use until the 1880s; this was dismantled in the 1890s, leaving only the kiln. The space was then used as a rifle range, with firing posts every 100 yards from a concrete target (also extant). The latter 500 yards of the range were removed in 1920, when Durham City moved to the ground. The only spectator facility was a wooden seated stand.

In 1921 Durham were elected to the Third Division North of the Football League, and the first Football League match played at the ground on 3 September 1921 saw Durham beat Southport 2–0 in front of 3,800 spectators. On 3 December 1921 the ground's record attendance of 7,886 was set for an FA Cup match against Darlington.

However, the ground's location some distance from the city centre made it unpopular with supporters, and in 1923 the club relocated to Holiday Park, taking with them the wooden stand. The last League game played at Kepier Haughs was on 5 May 1923 when Durham beat Barrow 4–1 in front of only 1,000 spectators, equalling the lowest recorded attendance at the ground.

The remaining 400 yards of the rifle range survived into the 1930s. By 2019 only the concrete frame of the target remained.

The site was purchased by the North Eastern Electric Supply Company in the 1940s, with a view to constructing a power station on the site, and on nationalisation ownership was transferred to the British Electricity Authority, which disposed of it in the 1950s.

The former football ground is now used as a school playing field; the final 400 yards is pasture land.
