= Lawrence of Durham =

12th-century English hagiographer, poet, and dialogist

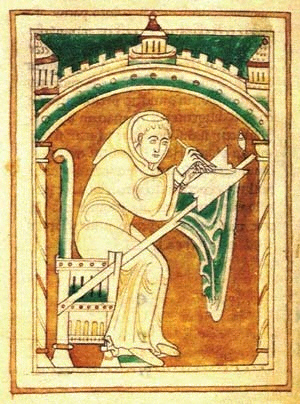
- Born: Waltham, Essex
- Died: March 1154; France
- Resting place: Durham
- Other name: Lawrence/Laurence of Waltham
- Education: Church of the Holy Cross school, Waltham
- Years active: 2nd quarter of the 12th century
- Known for: Latin poetry
- Title: Prior of Durham
- Term: 1149–1154
- Predecessor: Roger
- Successor: Absalom

Lawrence of Durham (died 1154) was a 12th-century English prelate, Latin poet and hagiographer. Born in southern England, at Waltham in Essex, Lawrence was given a religious education, and excelled at singing and poetry composition. In his youth Lawrence joined Durham Cathedral Priory and became a Benedictine monk. In the 1130s Lawrence became a courtier of Geoffrey Rufus, bishop of Durham.

After the latter's death, Lawrence was a leading opponent of William Cumin, claimant to the vacant episcopate during the first half of the decade, and suffered brief exile from the monastery. After Cumin's defeat and the accession of William de Ste Barbe, Lawrence became sub-prior and then prior of Durham. During his lifetime as a monk of Durham, Lawrence wrote several important works in Latin, including the Dialogi, the Hypognosticon, and a hagiography of Saint Brigd for Ailred of Rievaulx.

== Life and career ==
Lawrence was born at Waltham, Essex, a place that Lawrence claimed was renowned for its poets. A date of around 1114 has been suggested for his birth, but this is uncertain; other potential dates put forward include c. 1110 and c. 1100. Growing taller than average, he was educated at the church of Waltham Abbey, the church of the Holy Cross, before entering Durham Cathedral Priory as a novice during the episcopate of Ranulf Flambard (bishop of Durham, 1099–1128).

Two teachers of the Waltham school—Athelard and his son Peter—are known from this era, and it is likely that one of them was Lawrence's instructor. Waltham, founded by in the first half of the 11th century, had been a property of Durham from the episcopate of Walcher until its acquisition by Queen Matilda early in the reign of Henry I.

According to his own account, he continued his education at Durham, learning the trivium and quadrivium, with Virgil, Plato and Plotinus among his favourite authors. If Lawrence's own testimony is to be believed, he was held in high acclaim in his early years for his poetry and fine singing. In Lawrence's time as a teacher, he may have taught Ailred, later abbot of Rievaulx. Lawrence took up a place in the bishop's court during the episcopate of Geoffrey Rufus (1133–1141). Probably an episcopal chaplain, Lawrence was cantor and may have held the post of receiver general in Bishop Geoffrey's exchequer.

After Bishop Geoffrey's death, one of Geoffrey's former courtiers, William Cumin, arranged to have himself made the new bishop. Although winning support from most local potentates (though notably not Robert de Conyers), Cumin failed to secure the consent of the monastic chapter or the archdeacon, who insisted on a canonical election. For two years William had the support of earl of Northumberland Henry and his father the Scottish king, along with other Matildines, making his struggle for recognition part of The Anarchy, the wider struggle between Stephen de Blois and the Empress Matilda for the throne of England. Cumin lost most of this support by the end of 1142, neutralising the dispute, and in 1143 William de Ste Barbe was elected at York as the new bishop. Cumin subsequently seized the priory and ejected the monks, including Lawrence.

Lawrence's opposition, as expressed in his writings, was vehement, and he has been described as "one of the most persistent opponents of Cumin". Subsequently, Lawrence rose in station within the hierarchy of the priory. Lawrence held the office of sub-prior [deputy prior] by November 1147. Following the death of Prior Roger in either 1148 or 1149, Lawrence took over the leadership of the priory itself, and is named for the first time in such capacity in 1149. As prior of Durham, the most important ecclesiastical office in the diocese after the bishop, he remained until his death.

Lawrence died on either 16 March or 18 March 1154. Lawrence had gone to Rome to seek confirmation of the election of Hugh du Puiset as bishop of Durham, the replacement of William de Ste Barbe who had died in 1152. It was on his return, while in a French town, that illness took him. His body was later taken and buried at Durham.

== Writings ==
His earliest work appears to be his Vita Sanctae Brigidae, a Latin hagiography of the Irish Gaelic saint Brigid of Kildare. The story, Lawrence tells us, was that Lawrence had received from Ailred's father a hagiography of the saint written in a "half-barbaric" [semibarbarum] style. Lawrence polished it up, and sent it to Ailred while the latter was a member of the court of David I, King of the Scots; that is, between 1130 and 1134. Lawrence's letter to Ailred survives.

Lawrence's most famous work in the Middle Ages—surviving in at least 17 manuscript copies—was the Hypognosticon (meaning, according to Lawrence, abbreviation). This he wrote during his years [before 1141] at Bishop Geoffrey's court. It is a nine-book epic of unrhymed couplets, recounting the biblical tale of mankind from the creation to the present. Lawrence had been composing a metrical version of the Bible, though becoming a member of the episcopal court meant he was only able to compose 40 lines per day. He managed to get the work up to a good size when it disappeared one Christmas, stolen, Lawrence thought, by a maid-servant. The Hypognosticon, an improved version of what he could remember of this work, was written in the space of one month.

Another major work, the Dialogi, has been hailed as Lawrence's "most original work". The work is a set of dialogues, in four books, averaging c. 550 lines of elegiacs. The dialogues feature Lawrence, Philip, another monk of Durham, and a Breton named Peter. In the first two books, where Lawrence and Philip are in exile, Lawrence describes his longing for the good times of Bishop Geoffrey's era, describes the great things of Durham, and disparages Cumin and the behaviour of his soldiers . In books iii and iv, when the two Durham monks have been allowed to return by Cumin, Lawrence recounts his own upbringing, and the characters debate various moral points.

Another work attributed to Lawrence, the Consolatio de Morte Amici ["Consolation on the Death of a Friend"], is a prosimetrum of 15 metra and 16 prose sections, closely modelled on Boethius's De Consolatione Philosophiae. Lawrence, grieving over the death of his friend Paganus, is persuaded not to mourn by an interlocutor, who insists on the immortality of Paganus' soul and God's love.

Further, five speeches written in prose are extant: Laurentius pro Laurentio (attacking unjust allegations and tyranny), Pro in Malgerium (rebutting an allegation of sedition), Pro Iuvenibus (defending some men who looted a ship wreck), Pro Milone (defending a suitor of a noble girl) and Pro Naufragis (reprimanding the people of Durham for bad treatment of wrecked sailors). Among other works of Lawrence is the 56-line "Tempora nec Sexum Metuit", a reflection on mankind and the Fall written in the margin of one Hypognosticon manuscript; a 23-line rebuke of fickleness, "Aura Puer Mulier"; and a dialogue carried out in 109 rhymed stanzas where Cleophas, Luke, Thomas and the other Apostles, bemoaning the Crucifixion, get interrupted and reassured by Christ.

== Notes ==
Catholic Church titles
Preceded by Roger	Prior of Durham; 1149–1154	Succeeded by Absalom
