= St Giles' Church, Durham =

Coordinates: 54.77796°N 1.56019°W

St Giles Church
- St Giles Church, Durham
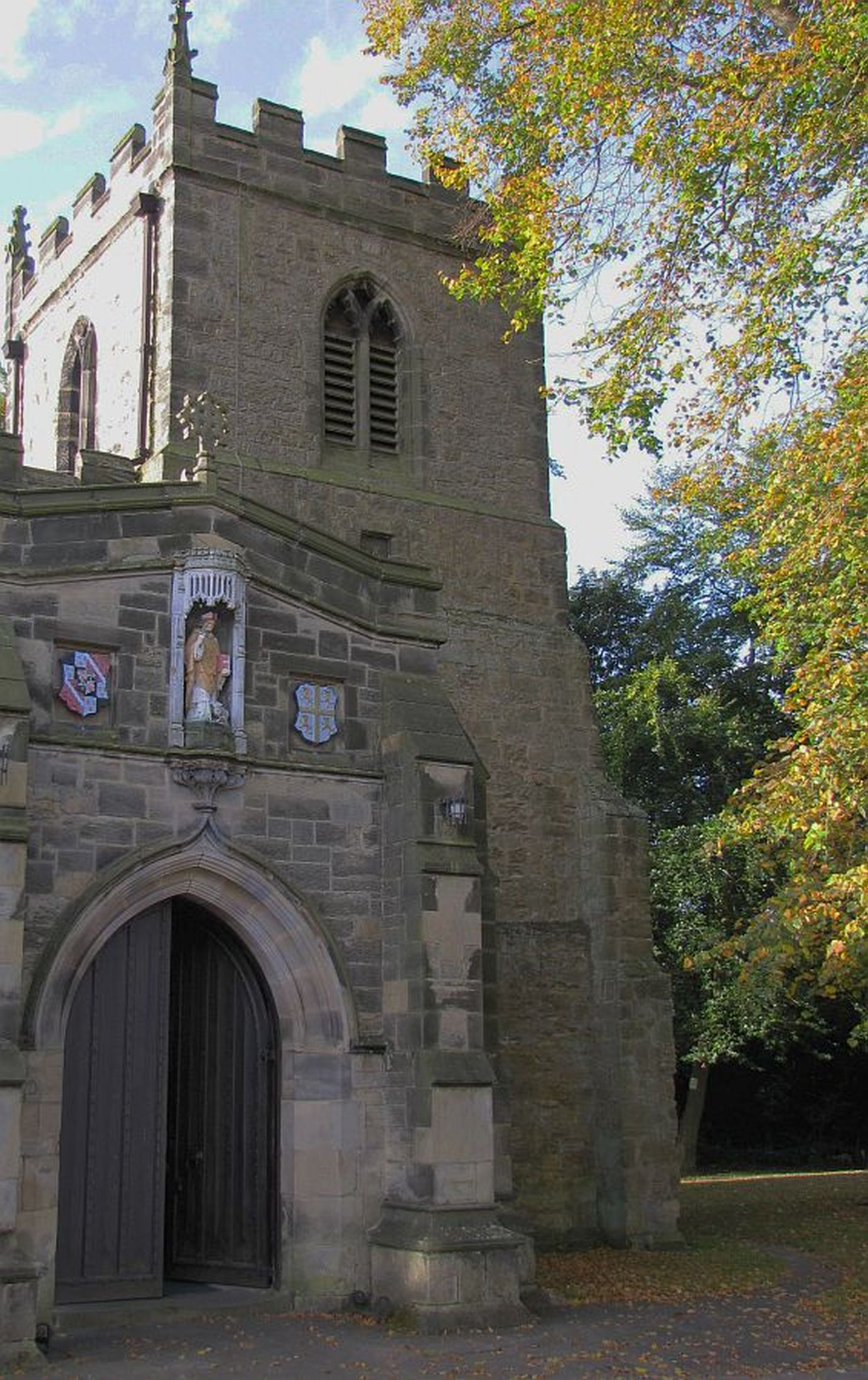
- St Giles Church
- OS grid reference: NZ 28388 42653
- Location: Durham, County Durham
- Country: England
- Denomination: Church of England
- Previous denomination: Roman Catholic
- Tradition: Central
- Website: http://www.stgilesdurham.org.uk

Architecture
- Functional status: Active
- Years built: c.1112

Administration
- Province: York
- Diocese: Durham

Clergy
- Vicar: Libby Wilkinson

St. Giles Church is a Grade I listed parish church in Gilesgate, County Durham, England. It was founded in 1112 by Bishop Ranulf Flambard as the chapel for nearby St. Giles' Hospital.

== History ==
The church was constructed as the hospital chapel of the Hospital of St Giles outside the city walls. It was dedicated on St Barnabas' Day, June 1112 by Bishop Flambard to "the honour of God and St Giles". Godric of Finchale was a doorkeeper as St. Giles before moving to Finchale to become a hermit.

The church became caught up in an 1140 dispute over the bishopric of Durham following the usurpation of the diocese by William Cumin, Chancellor of King David I of Scotland. William of St. Barbara, the rightly elected Bishop, was forced to retreat to, and fortify, the church after his abortive entry into Durham was beaten back by Cumin's men. In response Cumin's men destroyed the hospital, which was later refounded at nearby Kepier.

In 1180 Bishop Puiset extended the church to reflect its role at the centre of a growing parish, adding the chancel. The current font is believed to date from this time. The church was appropriated to Kepier Hospital which acted as rector, receiving tithes and with the advowson (right to appoint a vicar), appointing a parochial chaplain to minister to the needs of the parish.

Extensive building and restoration work was also carried out during the 13th and 15th centuries. John Heath, the Elizabethan owner of the Kepier estates, Gilesgate and Old Durham is buried in the church.

The ecclesiastical parish of St Giles was divided in 1852 with the creation of a new Belmont parish, served from the church of St Mary Magdalene, Belmont and covering Belmont, Gilesgate Moor and New Durham.

St Giles Church retains some of Flambard's original building (primarily the north wall) and most of Puiset's additions. Minor restoration and three large windows were inserted into the south wall in 1828. The church was restored and extended in 1873-1876 as the parish continued to grow. The organ was built by Harrison & Harrison in 1882.

The war memorial at the St. Giles Church, commemorates the members of the parish who were killed or missing in the First World War; it lists sixty-seven names. There are three bells in the tower that hang from a girder installed in 1964. The old oak bell frames are likely of late medieval or early post-medieval date.

. The Rev’d Abbey Hughes is curate.
