= Kepier power station =

Cancelled power station in Kepier, UK

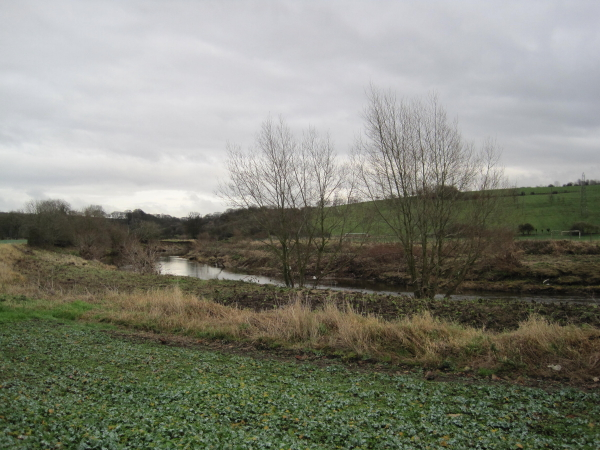
- The proposed site in December 2009
- Country: England
- Location: Kepier, County Durham
- Coordinates: 54.786°N 1.562°W
- Status: Cancelled
- Construction cost: £3,500,000 (planned)
- Owner: North Eastern Electric Supply Company

Thermal power station
- Primary fuel: Coal

Power generation
- Nameplate capacity: 150 MW

External links
- Commons: Related media on Commons

The Kepier power station was a cancelled coal-fired power station on the River Wear at Kepier, 0.75 miles (1.21 km) north east of Durham, County Durham, North East England. Planned by the North Eastern Electric Supply Company (NESCo) in 1944, it was never realised as the scheme faced stiff opposition from those who claimed it would obstruct views of the historic Durham Cathedral from the East Coast Main Line. A number of people supported the scheme as it would help meet the increasing demand for electricity and provide much needed jobs in the post-depression, post-war economy of Britain. The station, which had been designed by architect Giles Gilbert Scott, would have been operational by the late 1940s and would have generated 150 megawatts of electricity. However, following a public inquiry the plans were not approved and instead NESCo installed additional capacity at their existing power stations.

== Background ==
After several years of preliminary planning, surveying sites and drawing up plans, the North Eastern Electric Supply Company (NESCo) bought the site of a large rifle range, over both sides of the River Wear, at Kepier, 0.75 miles (1.21 km) north east of the city of Durham, and in early 1944 publicly announced their plans to build a large coal-fired power station on the site. The station was part of a post-war plan by NESCo, and the scheme had a projected cost of £3,500,000. The site was chosen in the mid-Durham area to be close to the coal supplies. It also needed to be a short distance from the River Wear, downstream of Durham, and on solid foundations. Mine workings in County Durham restricted the number of possible sites which could meet the requirement for solid foundations. The site also required good road and rail access.

The estimated build time for the station was around four years, and once completed the station was expected to employ around 300 people. In June 1944, NESCo formally submitted their plans for consent of construction.

== Design ==
The station's site plans and elevations were designed by Giles Gilbert Scott. He had previously designed Battersea Power Station in London, and so the designs of the Kepier station were considered to have been of a very high architectural quality. NESCo claimed that the design of the station would be considered "a credit to the whole district". The main station building was to be 135 feet (41 m) in height.

The station would have burned between 1,500 and 2,000 tonnes of low-grade coal per week, to produce 150 megawatts (MW) of electricity. The coal was to be taken from mines in County Durham, and transported to the station by the Durham goods branch of the Leamside Line railway, which terminated at nearby Gilesgate. New sidings would have been required to reach the site from the railway line, which would have required cutting into the hillside above Kepier. Upon arriving at the station, coal would have been discharged from the wagons 135 feet (41 m) above the station and transported via a conveyor belt over six arches down to the station itself.

The coal burnt would have had an estimated ash content of between 14% and 22%, and so at a cost of £160,000, the company were to install electrostatic precipitators, to remove 97% of the dust from the smoke and waste gasses from combustion, before leaving the two 350 feet (110 m) high chimneys. The view at the time was that the remaining dust that would leave the chimneys would not have caused "any appreciable pollution", and the waste gasses, consisting of carbon dioxide, were thought not to "cause any injury or harm to the inhabitants of the city, to buildings or to vegetation."

Between 350 and 450 tonnes of bottom ash clinker would be produced by the station per week. NESCo intended to sell this on to local construction companies as a construction material and believed there was a ready market for this. Fly ash from the precipitators would also have built up, and NESCo claimed they would have spread this on land to the west of the station, and mixed it with soil to produce a 14 feet (4.3 m) high spoil tip.

The station would have featured six 170 feet (52 m) high cooling towers. It was said that there would be provision to prevent excessive amounts of steam leaving the cooling towers, with no haze coming from the towers on 95% of days of the year.

== Criticism and support ==
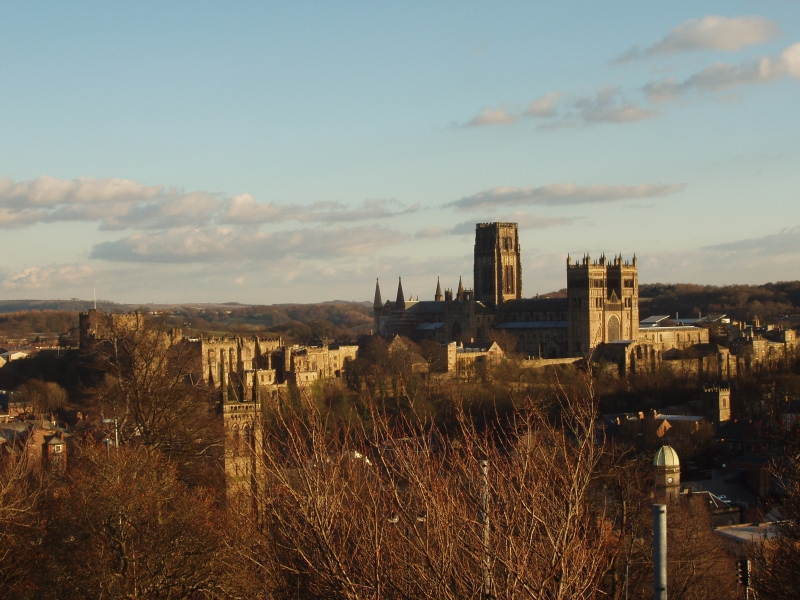
It was thought that the power station would interfere with views of Durham Cathedral from the railway line

When the plans were first announced the county surveyor raised no objections, and it was not until October 1943 and onwards that the Ministry of Town and Country Planning began to increasingly warn of the opposition that was bound to arise against the scheme.

The plans were strongly opposed by Thomas Wilfred Sharp, an urban planner from Durham, who thought that the station would intrude on the city's skyline. They were also opposed by The City of Durham Preservation Society (now the City of Durham Trust) which had been founded two years earlier. At the time the station had been given the go ahead by Durham City Council and the planning authority, but the Trust believed the station's tall chimneys and cooling towers would dwarf the nearby Durham Cathedral.

NESCo argued that they thought the power station would enhance the city's attractions, with people coming to see the power station itself. At the least, they tried to assure the public that if built, the station would take as little away from the city as possible. An official statement from the company stated:

"Consultants of every kind will be employed in connection with the construction, and the City Corporation can rest assured that every precaution will be taken both in the design and the working of the station to cause as little harm as possible to the amenities of the City."

NESCo also argued that they had chosen the site to protect the city's amenities, in that it was outside the city boundary, partially surrounded by higher ground, and in the lee of prevailing winds. They also said that much could be done architecturally to fit the station into its surroundings.

Local trade unions, Durham County Council, and even the Farmers' Union were in support of the scheme, along with a number of private persons, the general reason being that it would bring a new form of employment to the city and surrounding areas. Opponents to the station however claimed that the new jobs at the power station would go to specialist technicians brought into the region, and that the positioning of the station near Durham would not be beneficial to the city's electricity supply or make the cost of electricity any cheaper for those living near the station. Critics also claimed that wherever in the region a new power station were to be built, County Durham coal would be used in it, and that despite NESCo's claims, there may be more suitable sites elsewhere. The critics claimed that Durham's functioning as a cultural, educational, administrative and tourist center, would be ultimately destroyed by heavy industrialisation.

At a meeting of Durham County Council on 26 July 1944, J.W. Foster, chairman of the Finance Committee of the council, spoke in favour of the proposals, claiming they would fulfill the Government's White Paper on Employment Policy, and its policy on the rehabilitation of depressed areas. At the outbreak of war, the north of the country had still not fully recovered from the Great Depression of the 1930s, and Foster believed the employment the station's construction and maintenance provided would help prevent a return to those conditions. It was also seen that the station would generally improve the supply of electricity for industry. He pointed out that the criticism of the scheme was based entirely on assumption that the station would "destroy the Medieval charm of the city", without taking into account the thoughts of the experts who designed the station. He also pointed out that the critics made their comments without any suggestion of an alternative, and that their campaign against the scheme had attracted publicity through a BBC broadcast.

Foster also claimed that if any other feasible site could be found, then it should be used to avoid any violation of the view. However, he warned that the interest of the county's economy should be put in front of the concerns of "those ill-informed critics, who view Durham from the railway ... passing from one more fortunate district to another." Durham MP Charles Grey later referred to the development as "vital to the well being of the County of Durham".

British architect Frederick Gibberd published a diagrammatic comparison of Durham Cathedral alongside a power station typical of the design of the time, like the one planned at Kepier. This made clear that, although the cathedral was one of the largest in the country, it still would look small next to the projected power station. It was argued that as long as the two structures were viewed simultaneously, the visual juxtaposition would be detrimental to the cathedral. Somewhat ironically, Gibberd's Didcot A power station would later be voted the third worst eyesore in Britain in 2003. It was demolished between 2014 and 2020.

Although geographically located 1 mile (1.6 km) north east and 100 feet (30 m) lower, it was thought that Kepier power station would dominate any view into which it entered and that it would enter into most of the views in the city. A Northern Echo reader summarised these ideas in 1944:

"As the traveller by train approaches Kepier and Durham from the North there would meet his eye in the foreground this vast power station. Kepier, a local beauty spot, and the picturesque remains of Kepier Hospital, a building of much historic interest, would be blotted out, the Castle and Cathedral beyond would be dwarfed by an incongruous mass of concrete buildings ill sorting with the landscape."

== Inquiry ==
After the suggestion by the head of the Ministry of War Transport Cyril Hurcomb to conduct a joint local hearing chaired by an outsider was turned down by the Government due to much greater means being needed, the Government agreed that a public inquiry should be opened. A public inquiry into the plans was opened in December 1944, with the hearing lasting for three days. The Ministry of Town and Country Planning appointed Hurcomb as the chairman of the inquiry. The Electricity Commissioners appointed George Pepler and C.G. Morley New. The key opponents of the scheme were the City of Durham Preservation Society, chaired by Cyril Alington.

NESCo were represented by Craig Henderson and Sydney Turner. The NESCo representatives argued that although the company already supplied around 85% of the North East region, a great deal more generating capacity would need to be built to meet the demand for years to come, and that the mid-Durham area was the best place to erect a new station. Henderson claimed the only real opposition to the scheme was that it would interfere with the amenities of Durham. John Hacking, chief engineer of the Central Electricity Board, backed NESCo because if the scheme were declined, and consent and new arrangements had to be made, they would have no new plant in operation until after 1948.

A 11.8 kilograms (26 lb) Plasticine model of the station, city and surroundings was used in the inquiry. It was accompanied by a certificate of essentiality, issued by the Electricity Commissioners. Photographs of the city were also shown with the power station superimposed.

During the hearing, Hurcomb pointed out a letter published in The Times in July 1944, in which the Bishop and Dean of Durham, and Warden of the Durham Colleges, had given the misleading impression that the proposed station would ruin views from the railway line, an idea compounded by the publication a few days later of a photograph taken from the proposed site. He acknowledged that a number of views from parts of the river would be ruined, and that the station would be visible from the cathedral and church, Hurcomb emphasised that the majority of the beautiful views around the city would remain. Pepler also found that from the railway station, the power station and the cathedral could not be viewed simultaneously. The members of the inquiry initially concluded that the station should be given the go-ahead, based on the grounds that a more suitable site could not be decided upon.

The City of Durham Preservation Society, however, argued that with so many of Europe's finest monuments being destroyed in the Second World War, Durham and its cathedral was a gem which had survived both the war and the "industrial despoliation which had laid waste to so much of the rest of the County". Pepler supported the view that Durham was more suited as an administrative, shopping, and tourist centre, than it was for large-scale industrial development.

Legal and political difficulties caused a long delay in reaching a decision. An important issue was whether or not the inquiry was subject to the new Town and Country Planning Act of 1944. NESCo from the beginning challenged the right of the Minister of Town and Planning, W. S. Morrison, to convene an inquiry at all. The initial legal advice to the Government was that it was not subject, and the inquiry was convened with terms of reference that they were to consider whether a proposed new or extended station could supply sufficient electricity to meet the needs of consumers at no greater cost than any alternative source of supply. In Hurcomb's view the inquiry could not refuse consent if these conditions were met. A later decision by the Treasury Solicitor that the inquiry was, in fact, subject to the Act had the effect of paralysing decision making.

If Hurcomb persisted in adhering to his terms of reference and approved the power station, but Durham Rural District Council then withheld planning consent on the grounds of the objections, NESCo would be entitled to compensation for their losses due to the delay and building on a new site. The District Council would be liable for this but it was out of the question that they would be able to afford the large amount involved and the Government wished to avoid stepping in to pay themselves. If the inquiry could be persuaded to find against NESCo then no compensation would be payable and Hurcomb came under pressure from Ministers to do just that. Hurcomb argued that this would be denying compensation to those entitled to it and by April 1945 the decision on the station was still being delayed. The chairman of NESCo at the time voiced his anger in The Times, and Frank Tribe, secretary of the Ministry of Fuel and Power, wrote to Hurcomb asking if anything could be done to bring the inquiry to a decision.

Eventually, Hurcomb put forward at a ministerial meeting a solution whereby the members of the inquiry would inform NESCo that on purely technical grounds they would have approved the scheme, but due to the opposition of Morrison, they had decided not to proceed to a decision. Although NESCo were initially hostile, in June 1945 they agreed to drop the scheme on condition that they received a letter from Morrison agreeing that they had satisfied the commissioners on technical grounds, thus entitling them to compensation. The Government thought the site was open to well founded objections, and even if the scheme had proceeded past the inquiry stage, they would have refused consent anyway.

== Outcome ==
Ultimately, the decision of the inquiry went against NESCo and those in support of the station, and the company dropped their plans. NESCo received an ex gratia payment of £6,650 from the Ministry of Town and Country Planning for the expenditure incurred to that point. The site itself was inherited by the nationalised British Electricity Authority in 1948 and they eventually sold it. On 9 October 1945, Minister of Town and Country Planning Lewis Silkin made clear in the House of Commons that NESCo had begun extending their existing power stations by installing additional generating plant at sites other than Kepier, sufficing the demand for electricity, and meaning no station was needed at Kepier.
