= Bellingham, Northumberland =

Village in Northumberland, England

Coordinates: 55°08′40″N 2°15′17″W

Bellingham
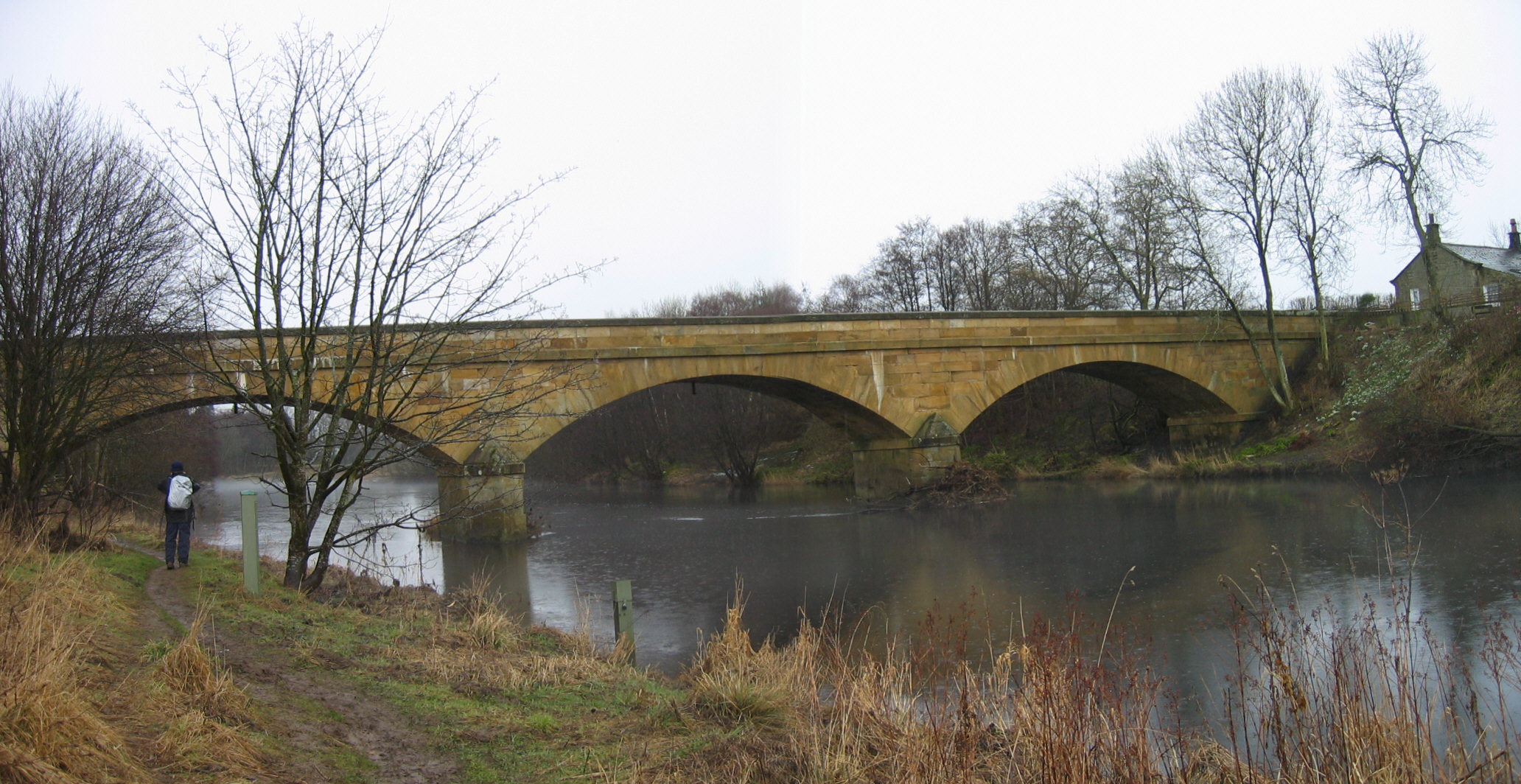
- Bellingham Bridge

- Location within Northumberland
- Population: 1,334 (2011)
- OS grid reference: NY835835
- Civil parish: Bellingham
- Unitary authority: Northumberland
- Ceremonial county: Northumberland
- Region: North East
- Country: England
- Sovereign state: United Kingdom
- Post town: HEXHAM
- Postcode district: NE48
- Dialling code: 01434
- Police: Northumbria
- Fire: Northumberland
- Ambulance: North East
- UK Parliament: Hexham

Bellingham (/ˈbɛlɪndʒəm/ BEL-in-jəm) is a village and civil parish in Northumberland, to the north-west of Newcastle upon Tyne and is situated on the Hareshaw Burn at its confluence with the River North Tyne. In 2011 the parish had a population of 1334.

== Features ==
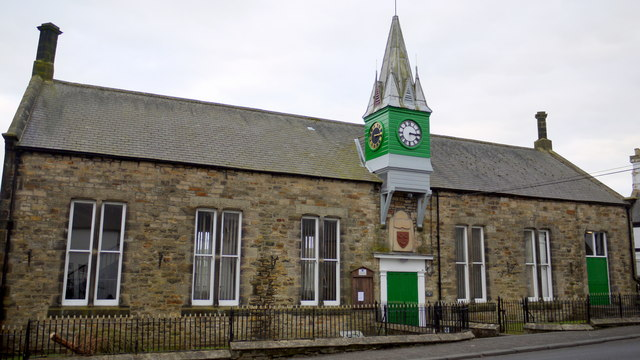
Bellingham Town Hall

Famous as a stopping point on the Pennine Way trail, it is popular with walkers and cyclists. Nearby is the Hareshaw Linn, a waterfall and the site of early coke blast furnaces.

The village's local newspaper is the Hexham Courant. There is an 18-hole golf course which was established in 1893.

The Heritage Centre is the local museum. It has exhibitions on the Border Counties Railway, the Border reivers, mining, farming, the photography of W P Collier, and the Stannersburn Smithy. It has a database of local family names and one of old photographs. It also holds special exhibitions of historical or artistic interest, and readings and performances by poets, storytellers, musicians and dancers.

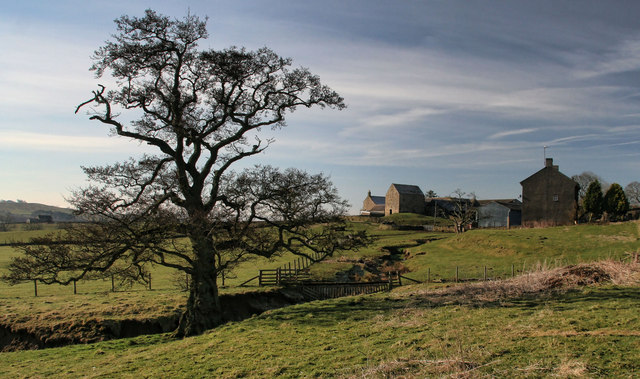
Hole Farm and Bastle

== St Cuthbert's ==
The Grade-I listed Church of St Cuthbert (13th century, substantially reconstructed in the early 17th century) is described as "almost unique in England" owing to its stone barrel vault, which runs the length of the nave and extends into the south transept. Three miracles in Bellingham connected with the mediaeval cult of St Cuthbert are recorded in the twelfth-century Libellus of Reginald of Durham.

Within the churchyard on the north side is "The Lang Pack", purportedly the grave of a burglar who attempted to infiltrate a local house by hiding in a beggar's pack, but was discovered after he suffered an ill-timed coughing fit, and was promptly run through with the sword of the house's proprietor.

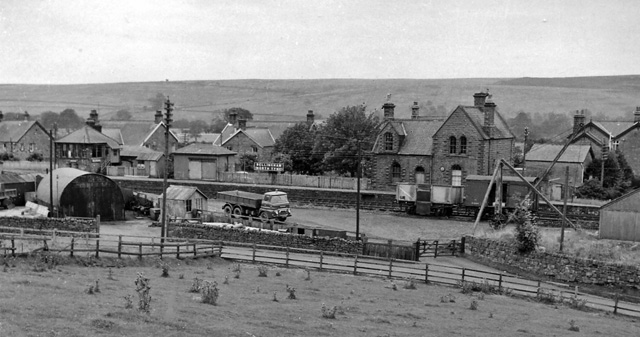
Until 1966 Bellingham had a railway station, seen here in 1962

Adjacent to the church is St Cuthbert's Well, known locally as "Cuddy's Well", an ancient holy well. The well is in the middle of a grassy path leading down to the river, on the other side of the churchyard wall.

From 1735 the parish rectors at Bellingham were under the patronage of the Governors of Greenwich Hospital. The Governors stipulated that the rectors were to be graduates of Oxford or Cambridge, and naval chaplains. Bellingham Rectory was one of six such rectories in the Simonburn area, the others being Falstone, Greystead, Thorneyburn, Wark on Tyne and Simonburn.

== Landmarks ==
Bellingham Bridge is a Grade II listed building built in 1834. It crosses the North Tyne. Bellingham Town Hall was completed in 1862.

Two miles north-east at Hole Farm is a 16th-century Grade II* listed building, Hole Bastle, a well-preserved example of a bastle house. Another example is Black Middens Bastle House which is situated at an isolated spot on the north side of the Tarset Valley. It is managed by English Heritage.

Shitlington Crags is a crag near Shitlington Hall, south of Bellingham, at 170 metres elevation. The Pennine Way passes by the crag.

There is a former Union Workhouse located along the main street of Bellingham.

== Notable residents ==
- Sir David Lindsay Keir, the historian and academic, was born and brought up here.

== Governance ==
Bellingham is in the parliamentary constituency of Hexham. Joe Morris of the Labour Party is the Member of Parliament.

For local government purposes it belongs to Northumberland County Council, a unitary authority. There is an electoral ward of the same name; it stretches north to the Scottish border and has a total population of 4,074. The incumbent councillor for the Bellingham ward is John Riddle, who is a member of the Conservative Party.

Bellingham has its own parish council, Bellingham Parish Council.

== Sports ==
The village football team competes in the Tyneside Amateur League First Division.

== See also ==
- St Cuthbert's Well
