= Kepier =

Location in Belmont, Durham

Coordinates: 54.780°N 1.566°W

Kepier is a location in the city of Durham, England in the parish of Belmont, close to Gilesgate and beside the River Wear. It is site of the medieval Hospital of St Giles at Kepier.

The name derives from 'Kipe weir', meaning a weir with a fish trap, and the convenience of being close to a source of fish (a major part of the monastic diet) may have influenced the location of the hospital.

Kepier was also the site of a medieval corn mill, which continued in use until its destruction by fire on September 24, 1870 caused by a spark from the grinding of the stone millwheels. The mill was never rebuilt; only a stone arch over the remnant of the mill race remains.

Kepier may also have been the site of a Roman crossing of the River Wear carrying a postulated Roman road, Cade's Road, which led north to Pons Aelius (modern Newcastle upon Tyne).

The Kepier estate previously extended over much of Gilesgate, Gilesgate Moor and Carrville.

In the 1940s, plans for Kepier power station were drafted, but the project was never undertaken.
