= Kepier Hospital =

Coordinates: 54°47′01″N 1°33′46″W

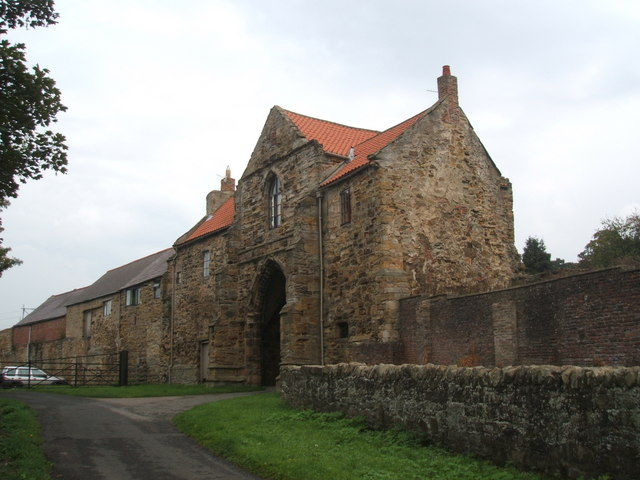
- Gatehouse of the Kepier Hospital

Geography
- Location: Kepier, England, United Kingdom

History
- Founded: June 1112
- Closed: 1539

Links
- Lists: Hospitals in England

Kepier Hospital (properly the Hospital of St Giles of Kepier) was a medieval hospital at Kepier, Durham, England.

== Founding at Gilesgate ==
The hospital was founded at Gilesgate, Durham, by Bishop Flambard as an almshouse "for the keeping of the poor who enter the same hospital". It was dedicated to God and St Giles, the patron saint of beggars and cripples. The first hospital chapel (now St Giles Church, Gilesgate) was dedicated in June 1112. Other than the church, the original buildings were wooden or wattle-and-daub structures. Flambard endowed the hospital with a range of lands, including the manor of Caldecotes, the mill on Durham's Millburn, and corn from fifteen of his villages. Godric of Finchale was a doorkeeper of the hospital church before settling at Finchale.

Geoffrey Rufus was Bishop of Durham. Rufus employed as a clerk William Cumin, who after Rufus' death in 1140 conspired with King David I of Scotland to seize the see of Durham. David tried to gain control of the English diocese by installing his own candidate into Durham, this being his chancellor, Cumin. In March 1143, Cumin was excommunicated and deprived of his benefices by Pope Innocent II. In 1144, William of St. Barbara, the rightly elected Bishop, was forced to retreat to, and fortify St Giles Church after his abortive entry into Durham was beaten back by Cumin's men. Bishop St. Barbara and his men then retired to Bishopton Castle. Cumin's men then destroyed the nearby hospital. In 1144, Cumin negotiated a settlement of the dispute, in which he relinquished his claims to Durham.

== Building at Kepier ==
The hospital was refounded beside the River Wear at Kepier, c.1180, by Bishop Hugh le Puiset with an establishment of thirteen brethren, serving around thirteen (male) inmates as well as travellers and pilgrims. Puiset bestowed more lands, including the village of Clifton, a lead-mine in Weardale, a peat bog at Newton, and more rights to corn from the Bishop's villages (gillycorn). To further secure the finances of the hospital, Puiset granted a charter allowing the creation of the borough of St Giles, the nucleus of modern Gilesgate, with many burgesses probably drawn from Caldecotes and Clifton.

Kepier was frequently bound up with the politics of the border country, with Edward I and Queen Isabella staying at the hospital on their journeys north. Kepier suffered from raids by the Scots, with goods seized from Durham in 1315 and the raiding of Kepiers' northern possessions.

== Dissolution ==
Kepier Hospital was inspected in 1535 as part of Henry VIII's Valor Ecclesiasticus survey of monasteries. It was shown to be the richest hospital in the diocese, devoting 25% of its gross annual income of £186 0s. 10d. to almsgiving. Kepier maintained four choral chaplains and 10 inmates, and distributed doles to the poor at the gates of £16 5s. a year. Henry ordered the closure of the lesser monastic houses (including Kepier), prompting the doomed Pilgrimage of Grace rebellion. The Master of the Hospital supported the Bishop of Durham in opposing the Pilgrims, but its (lay) steward Sir John Bulmer was executed for participating in the rebellion. Legislation of 1539 extended the suppression to some hospitals, which included Kepier, but spared Sherburn Hospital and Greatham Hospital. Kepier and its lands were granted to Henry's Secretary of State, Sir William Paget, although these soon reverted to the Crown and thence to a succession of lay owners including the Scotsman John Cockburn of Ormiston.

== Buildings and paths ==
The first hospital church remains in use as the parish church of St Giles, Gilesgate. No other buildings from the first hospital survive.

Lay owners of Kepier, the Heath family, made substantial alterations to the hospital site, including laying out of gardens and the erection of a mansion where the chapel and infirmary may have once stood. By 1827 this house had become a 'Kepier Inn' or the 'White Bear'. Kepier Mill survived until 1870, when it was destroyed by fire, of which only the kiln had remained, which in 2025 was demolished. Of the hospital site itself, the gatehouse is intact, the mansion survives as ruins, and the farmhouse is in private use. The site is now a Scheduled Monument with Grade I and Grade II* listed building status. The West Range is included on English Heritage's Buildings at Risk register.

Many of the routes of travel between Kepier, Gilesgate and the hospitals lands at Caldecotes and Clifton—by now High Grange (in modern Gilesgate Moor) and Low Grange (in modern Carrville)—exist as public footpaths and bridleways. The tithe barn at High Grange, used to store Kepier's corn, survived until 1964.

== Sources ==
- Meade, Dorothy M. Kepier Hospital. Turnstone Ventures, 1995. ISBN 0-946105-10-3
- English Heritage Buildings at Risk Register
