= Church of St Cuthbert, Bellingham =

Stone church building in Northumberland, England

Church of St Cuthbert
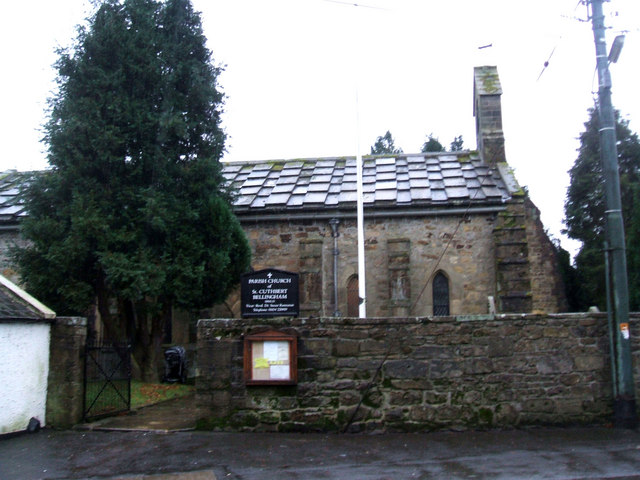
- View of church from the north showing the western end of the nave and its unusual stone slab roof.
- Interactive map of Church of St Cuthbert
- Location: Bellingham, Northumberland
- Coordinates: 55°08′36″N 02°15′22″W
- Built: 13th century
- Built for: Catholic Church in England and Wales
- Rebuilt: 1609
- Governing body: Church of England

Listed Building – Grade I
- Official name: Church of St Cuthbert
- Designated: 10 November 1951
- Reference no.: 1370442

The Church of St Cuthbert is a grade I listed building in Bellingham, Northumberland, owned by the Church of England. Parts of the church date to the 13th century and it survived the raids of the border reivers which burnt down many structures in the village. The structure consists of a nave, chancel and a large south chapel. The chancel is noted for having a remarkable roof consisting of strips of Lakeland slate. The graveyard contains the "Lang Pack", a tomb associated with a nearby country house robbery legend.

== Church ==
=== Description ===
The Church of St Cuthbert is located at the western end of Bellingham High Street, behind the Black Bull Hotel and somewhat out of sight of passing traffic. Parts of the church date to the 13th century and it survived the border reiver period, unlike many of the other mediaeval buildings in the village which were burnt down in raids. During building works in 1861 three cannonballs were recovered from within the roof, probably dating from 1597 when Bellingham was attacked by Walter Scott, 5th of Buccleuch. St Cuthbert's Well is located adjacent to the church and is said to have been discovered by the 7th-century Saint Cuthbert. Said to have healing powers the water was used by the church for baptisms. The structure was granted protection as a grade I listed building on 10 November 1951.

=== Structure ===
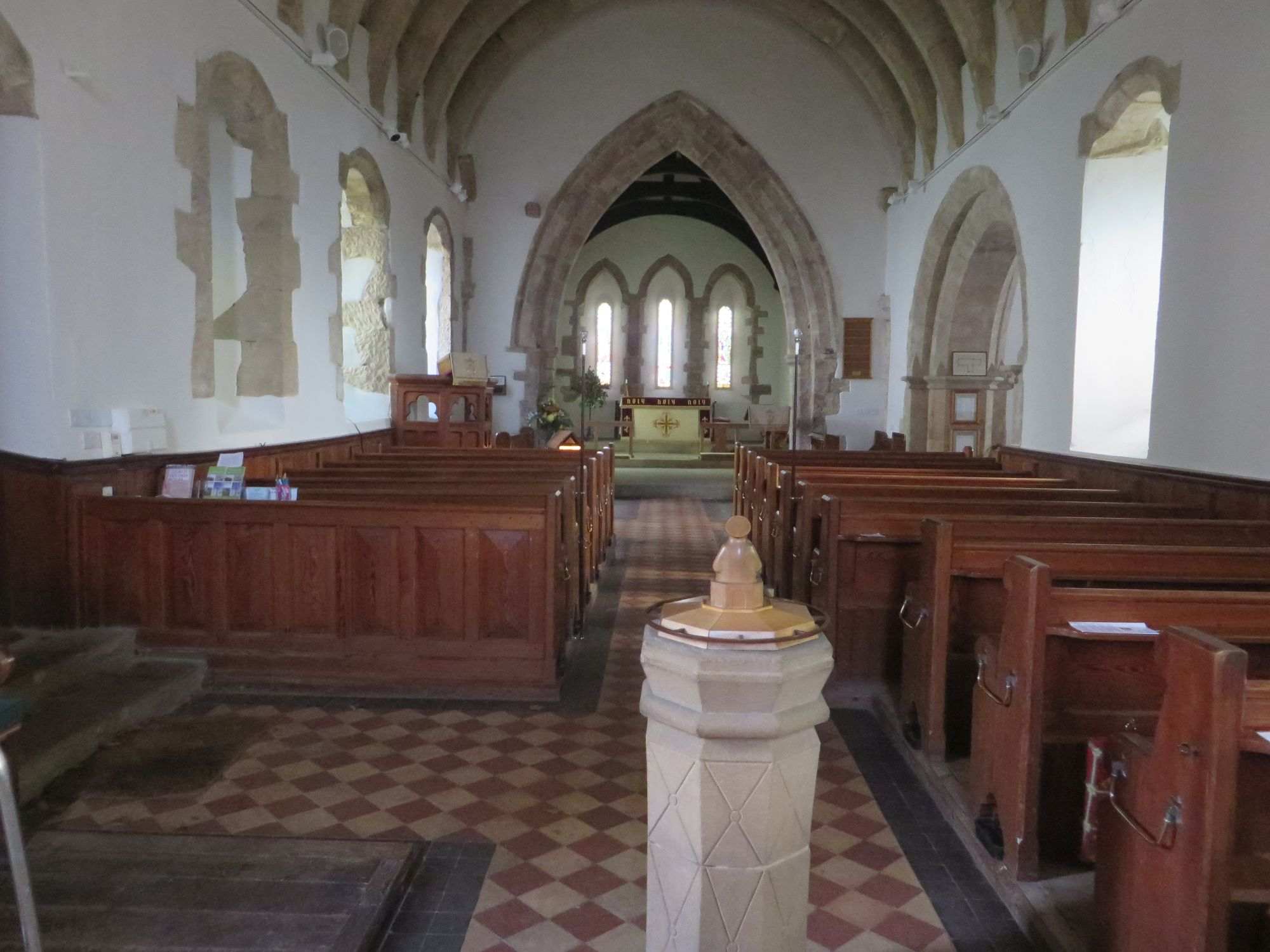
View of the interior of the nave looking eastwards to the chancel, with 13th-century chancel arch visible. North entrance is at the left foreground.

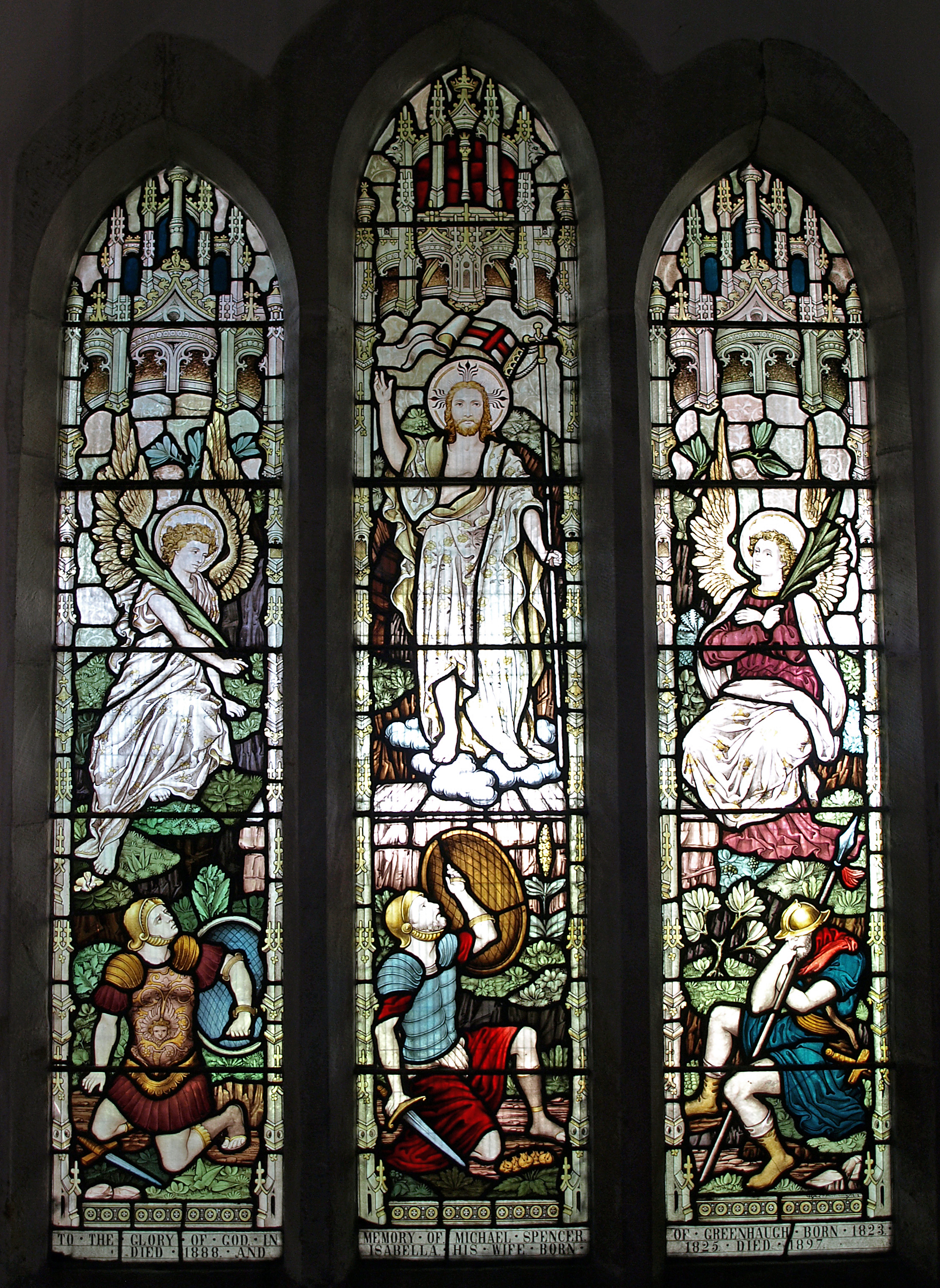
Detail from a stained glass window

The church was extensively rebuilt in 1609 and restored in 1865, when a bellcote was added at the western end. It consists of a nave, chancel and large south chapel. The nave has six bays with lancet windows, probably dating to the 17th century, between. A shallow arch doorway, with 17th-century door, is set into the third bay on the north side with a 19th-century copper lamp above the entrance. A similar doorway on the south side of the nave has been blocked up. The western end of the nave had two large stone buttresses added in the 19th century and a lancet window installed between them. The buttresses on the rest of the structure are generally 17th-century. The nave has a barrel vault roof of stone slabs supported by 15 transverse ribs. This roof has been described as being particularly remarkable for being made of alternating strips of single and double thickness slabs of Lakeland slate.

The chancel is 13th-century and has an original window on the south wall, with three later lancet windows on the Easter end. Th The structure contains a 13th-century double-chamfered chancel arch. The north wall holds monuments to Archibald Reed (1729) and Theresa and Harriet Charlton (1829), with a monument to Charlton of Redesmouth (1628) standing outside the south wall. The south chapel is remarkably large and accessed from the nave via a rounded, double-chamfered arch dated to 1609. The chapel contains a 13th-century window and a 17th-century square window and has a barrel vault roof formed of stone slabs.

== Lang Pack ==
The graveyard contains a remarkable tomb monument known as the Lang Pack, located a few steps away from the church entrance. This tomb has been linked with a legend associated with the nearby Lee Hall. It is said that the hall's owner, Colonel Ridley, closed up the hall for the winter of 1723 and relocated to London for the season, leaving the hall under the watch of a skeleton staff of three servants with strict instructions to admit nobody. The legend states that one night the hall was visited by a pedlar looking for somewhere to stay. He was refused admission but the servants allowed him to leave his large pack in the hall. Late in the night the pack was observed to move and was shot by one of the servants with a pistol. When the bag was opened it was found to contain the body of a man. As he had a whistle around his neck the servants deduced that he was planning to burgle the hall and would have blown the whistle to alert his gang once the door was open. The servants armed themselves, blew the whistle and drove off the gang when they arrived.

It is said that the tomb at the church contains the body of the man found in the long pack ("Lang Pack") and a sign in the churchyard names it as such. The legend may have its basis in fact, as country house heists were common in this period. The story is remembered in a poem by Bellingham resident Robert Allen written in the Geordie dialect.
