= Dragonville, Virginia =

Unincorporated community in Virginia, United States

- Unincorporated community
- Location within the Commonwealth of Virginia Dragonville (the United States)
- Coordinates: 37°41′51″N 76°46′41″W
- Country: United States
- State: Virginia
- County: King and Queen
- Time zone: UTC−5 (Eastern (EST))
  - Summer (DST): UTC−4 (EDT)

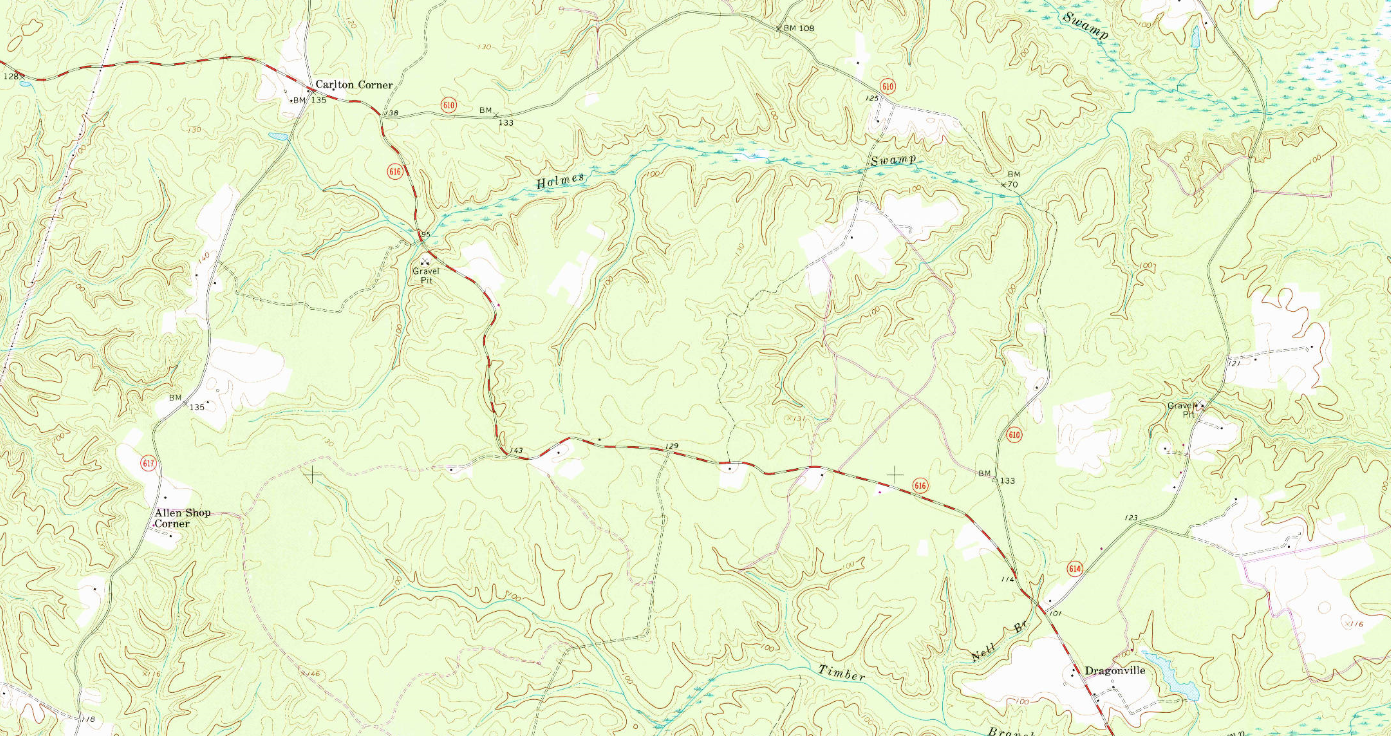
Dragonville located on right portion of 1970 USGS map.

Dragonville is an unincorporated community in King and Queen County, Virginia, United States, named after the English hamlet of Dragonville, County Durham.
