= Ranulf (chancellor) =

12th-century Anglo-Norman royal official

Lord Chancellor
- In office 1107–1123
- Monarch: Henry I of England
- Preceded by: Waldric
- Succeeded by: Geoffrey Rufus

Ranulf (also Ralph, Radulf, or Randulf) (d. 1123), was an English cleric and administrator. He became chancellor in the reign of Henry I of England.

== Life ==
Ranulf was a chaplain or clerk of Henry I, and became chancellor in 1107–8, holding that office until his death. For the last twenty years of his life he suffered much from illness; but his mind was active, and he left a bad reputation, being described as crafty, prompt to work evil of every kind, oppressing the innocent, robbing men of their lands and possessions, and glorying in his wickedness and ill-gotten gains.

In the first days of 1123 Ranulf rode with the king from Dunstable, where Henry had kept Christmas, escorting him to Berkhampstead Castle, which belonged to Ranulf. As he came in sight of his castle he fell from his horse, and a monk of St. Albans Abbey, who had been despoiled of his possessions by him, rode over him. He died of his injuries a few days afterwards.

Ranulf had a son, who joined him in some benefactions to Reading Abbey, and he also granted the manor of Tintinhull, Somerset, to Montacute Priory.

Political offices
Preceded by Waldric	Lord Chancellor; 1107–1123	Succeeded by Geoffrey Rufus
