= Reginald of Durham =

Benedictine monk and hagiologist

Reginald of Durham (died c. 1190) was a Benedictine monk and hagiologist, a member of the Durham Priory and associated with Coldingham Priory in Scotland.

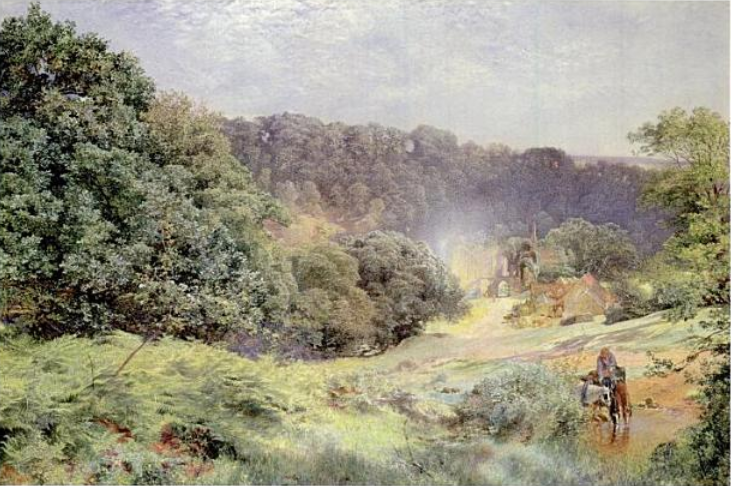
Alfred William Hunt, 1861: the ruins of Finchale Priory founded on the site of the hermitage of St Godric on the banks of the River Wear

On arriving at Finchale he beheld a place altogether wild, for it was almost unknown even to the inhabitants of the neighbouring country, and was the abode of the native vipers, and the hiding place of snakes. But he did not entertain any dread on that account, nor did he fear the nests of that multitude of vipers, nor the gloomy tombs that existed in that uncultivated solitude.

— Reginald of Durham, Vita et miracula Sancti Godrici

The details of his life are uncertain, but he was "apparently of English descent" and had joined the monks at Durham by around 1153. He was active in the 1160s and 1170s, spending time in Finchale with the hermit and saint Godric, and writing the works for which he is now known. It is thought that the time spent in Coldingham came later, after 1188, though again this is not certain – an alternative explanation for the association with Coldingham is that it was his birthplace, though this is considered less likely.

Two lengthy works on saints are attributed to Reginald. The first is an account of the life of Godric—including his taming influence on the snakes of Finchale that eventually nestled by his fireside—and the miracles that followed the saint's death. The second is a collection of 129 posthumous miracles attributed to the 7th-century saint Cuthbert, such as those associated with St Cuthbert's Well. The stated purpose of his libellus or "little book", kept near Cuthbert's shrine in Durham Cathedral, was to honour Cuthbert; it was also in the interests of the monastic community in Durham to maintain the cult of Cuthbert when that of the 12th-century saint Thomas was growing in Canterbury. A much shorter work concerned another 7th-century saint, Oswald, a martyred King of Northumbria. All three of these works included contributions by Aelred of Rievaulx, who encouraged and aided Reginald's work.

A fourth work may have been the basis of a sermon about St Ebba (615–683), however the sermon itself is not in the style associated with Reginald. According to Tudor, that style could "degenerate into almost incomprehensible turgidity", but his desire for detail and capacity for close observation made him capable of "extremely vivid evocation of contemporary conditions".
