= Finchale Priory =

Benedictine cell: hermitage, monastic precinct and site of priory watermill

Coordinates: 54.818121°N 1.540358°W

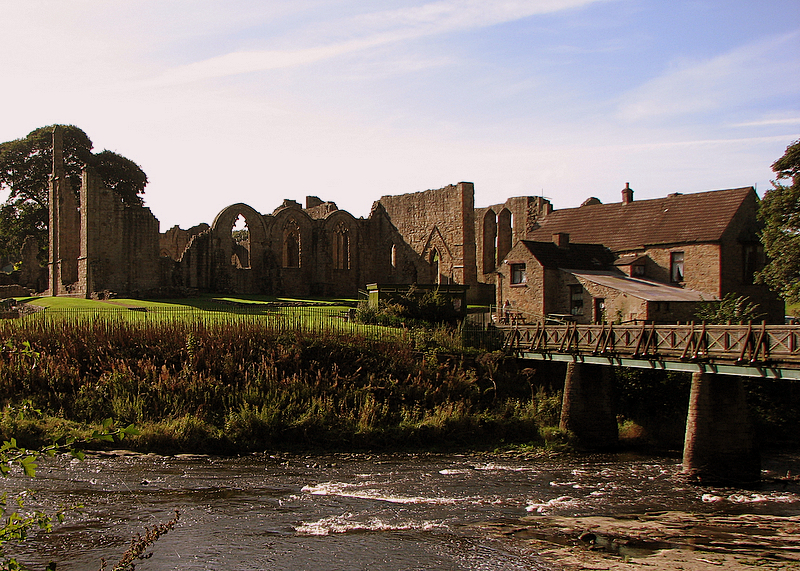
- Finchale Priory on the bank of the River Wear
- Interactive map of Finchale Priory

Monastery information
- Order: Benedictine
- Established: 1196
- Disestablished: 1535
- Mother house: Durham Priory
- Diocese: Durham

People
- Founder: Bishop Hugh Pudsey
- Important associated figures: Godric of Finchale

Site
- Location: Framwellgate Moor, County Durham, England
- Visible remains: foundations of 12th century chapel, extensive remains of later monastic complex
- Public access: yes (English Heritage)

Finchale Priory (/ˈfɪŋkəl/ FING-kəl), sometimes referred to as Finchale Abbey, was a 13th-century Benedictine priory. The remains are sited by the River Wear, four miles from Durham, England. It is a Grade I listed building.

== Early history ==
Godric was born about 1070. After years of travel as a merchant, sailor, and pilgrim, he felt called to change his life. Initially he lived in caves and woods before settling with an elderly hermit at Wolsingham in upper Weardale. Around 1112 Godric was living in Durham, serving as doorkeeper at the hospital church of St Giles. He persuaded the Bishop of Durham, Ranulf Flambard, who had befriended him, to grant him a place to live as a hermit at Finchale, by the River Wear. There Godric created a hermitage dedicated to St John the Baptist. Godric's biographers recorded that he lived an ascetic life on this site for 50 years, living and sleeping outside and rejecting expensive cloth and plentiful food. Godric's life was first recorded by Reginald of Durham. Godric's last years were marred by extreme illness, perhaps a result of his difficult lifestyle. For almost a decade before his death on 21 May 1170 Godric was confined to his bed and cared for by monks of Durham. He was buried against the north wall of his church, where his burial place is marked by a cross in the grass.

== Building history ==
There are some remains of the early 12th-century stone chapel of St John the Baptist, the site of Godric of Finchale's burial, built some time around the end of Godric's life. Some of the temporary buildings, erected for the first prior and his monks sent to establish the Priory some twenty years after Godric's death, still exist. The monastic complex was built in the latter half of the 13th century, with alterations and additions continuing for the following three hundred years.

There are many excellent examples of heavily decorated capitals on the original arcade columns, tracery in the filled-in nave arches of the church, and on the south wall is a double piscina and two carved seats of the sedilia.

The buildings and immediate grounds are managed by English Heritage. The precinct, through which the site is entered, is now a caravan park.

== Priory foundation and history ==
After Godric's death, two monks of Durham moved to Finchale, where there was already a church, mill, dam and fish pond. The site has been a dependency of Durham Cathedral since 1196, the year in which the chapel hermitage became known as Finchale Priory. In this year it was endowed by Bishop Hugh Pudsey and his son Henry in order to support the priory's eight monks and prior. Bishop Pudsey appointed Thomas, formerly sacrist of Durham, as prior. While Finchale was never to become a wealthy house, it was the richest of Durham's dependencies by the mid-15th century.

The church remained in various stages of construction for over a century after 1196. The most significant change following its completion was the narrowing of the nave and the chancel during the 1360s and 1370s through the removal of the aisles. Various construction projects lasted at Finchale through the mid-15th century as the church dates in part from around 1200 and in others from the late 14th century. The Hospitium (guest house) and a part of the prior's house date from the mid-15th century.

Finchale remained a priory until the dissolution of the lesser monasteries in 1536. During this time Finchale had 52 priors and accounting records still exist for much of the period 1303-1535. During much of its history the priory served as a rest facility for the monks at Durham, as four Durham monks would travel to Finchale for a three-week period to join the four monks in residence. During these periods of rest the Durham monks would alternate between fulfilling their religious services as usual and exercising more freedoms (in terms of leaving the monastery) than they usually enjoyed.

== List of the Priors of Finchale ==
- Thomas (appointed 1196)
- John
- Ralph
- Robert of Stitchil (later Bishop of Durham)
- Robert de Insula (later Bishop of Durham)
- Robert de Eskerick
- Henry de Tesdale (appears 1295)
- Walter de Swinburne
- Galfrid de Burdon (1303, 1307; later Prior of Durham)
- Richard
- Adam de Boyville
- Henry de Stamford (1312; elected—but not confirmed as—Bishop of Durham, 1316)
- Walter de Scaresbreck
- John de Laton (1317)
- Henry de Novo Castello (1318)
- Richard of Aslacby (1324–1331)
- Thomas de Lund, D.T. (1333)
- Emeric de Lumley (1341-2)
- John de Beverlaco
- John Barnaby (1345)
- Nicholas de Luceby (1346-9)
- John Wawayne
- John de Norton
- Thomas Graystanes (1354)
- William de Goldisburgh (1354–60)
- John de Neuton (1360-3)
- John de Tykhill (1363)
- Uhtred de Boldon (1367)
- Richard de Birtley (1372)
- John de Normandby (1373)
- Uhtred de Boldon (1375)
- John de Beryngton (1384)
- Uhtred de Boldon (1390)
- Roger Maynsforth
- Robert Rypon (1397)
- Thomas d'Autre (1405–1411)
- William de Poklyngton (1411–23)
- William Barry (1423)
- Henry Feriby (1439–50)
- John Oll (1450-1)
- Thomas Ayer (1451-7)
- Richard Bell (1457–64; later Bishop of Carlisle)
- Thomas Ayre (1464)
- Thomas de Hexham (1465)
- William Byrden (1466–79)
- Robert Werdale (1479–91)
- John Swan (1491)
- Richard Caley (1502)
- William Cathorne (1506, 1514, 1519, 1520)
- Richard Caley (1525-7)
- John Halywell (1528)
- William Bennett (1536)
