= Godric of Finchale =

English hermit (c. 1065–1170)

Saint Godric of Finchale
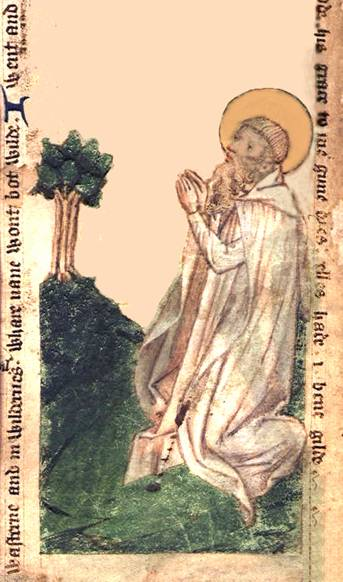
- St Godric

Hermit
- Born: c. 1065-1070; Walpole, Norfolk, England
- Died: 21 May 1170; Finchale in County Durham, England
- Venerated in: Catholic Church
- Attributes: Hermit

Godric of Finchale (or St Goderic) (c. 1065-1070 – 21 May 1170) was an English hermit, merchant and popular medieval saint, although he was never formally canonised. He was born in Walpole in Norfolk and died in Finchale in County Durham.

Some of the earliest surviving English songs have been attributed to him.

== Life ==
I. Saintë Marië Virginë,
Moder Iesu Cristes Nazarenë,
Onfo, schild, help thin Godric,
Onfong bring hegilich
With the in Godës riche.

II. Saintë Marië Cristes bur,
Maidenës clenhad, moderës flur;
Dilie min sinnë, rix in min mod,
Bring me to winnë with the selfd God.

— The first two hymns of St Godric, some of the earliest surviving musical settings in Middle English (Note: I. St Mary, Virgin, Mother of Jesus Christ the Nazarene, Receive, shield, help your Godric, When received, bring him solemnly With you into God's kingdom. II. Saint Mary, Christ's bower, Maiden's purity, mother's flower, Destroy my sin, reign in my heart, Bring me to bliss with the very same God.)

Godric's life was recorded by a contemporary of his, a monk named Reginald of Durham. Several other hagiographies are also extant. According to these accounts, Godric, who began from humble beginnings as the son of Ailward and Edwenna, "both of slender rank and wealth, but abundant in righteousness and virtue". He began as a peddler and became an entrepreneur. "[H]e was wont to wander with small wares around the villages and farmsteads of his own neighbourhood; but, in process of time, he gradually associated himself by compact with city merchants."

Then he was a ship's captain and part owner of two ships, one of which may have conveyed Baldwin I of Jerusalem to Jaffa in 1102. After many pilgrimages around the Mediterranean, Godric found himself off the Farne Islands near Lindisfarne and there was inspired to change his life.

Godric returned to England and lived at Wolsingham with an elderly hermit named Aelric (†1107) for two years. Upon Aelric's death, Godric made one last pilgrimage to Jerusalem, and then returned home where he convinced Ranulf Flambard, the Bishop of Durham, to grant him a place to live as a hermit at Finchale, by the River Wear. He had previously served as doorkeeper, the lowest of the minor orders, at the hospital church of nearby St Giles Hospital in Durham. At Finchale he cleared forests to build a wooden oratory dedicated to the Virgin Mary; later he constructed a stone chapel dedicated to St John the Baptist.

He is recorded to have lived at Finchale for the final sixty years of his life, occasionally meeting with visitors approved by the local prior. As the years passed, his reputation grew, and Thomas Becket and Pope Alexander III both reportedly sought Godric's advice as a wise and holy man.

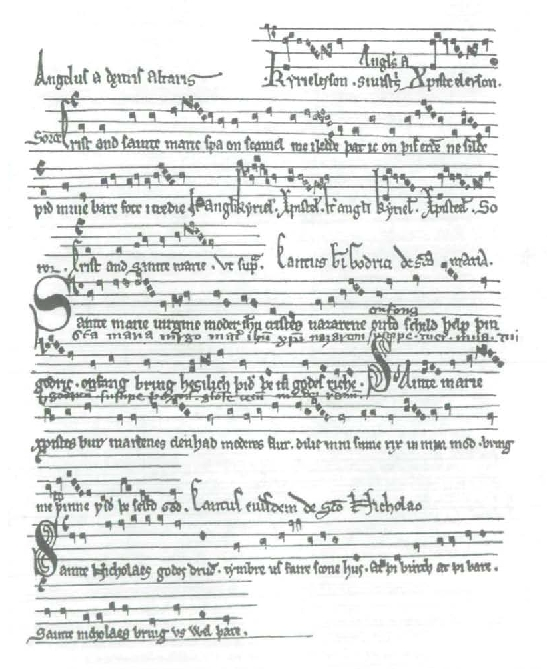
13th-century manuscript of the four hymns of St Godric

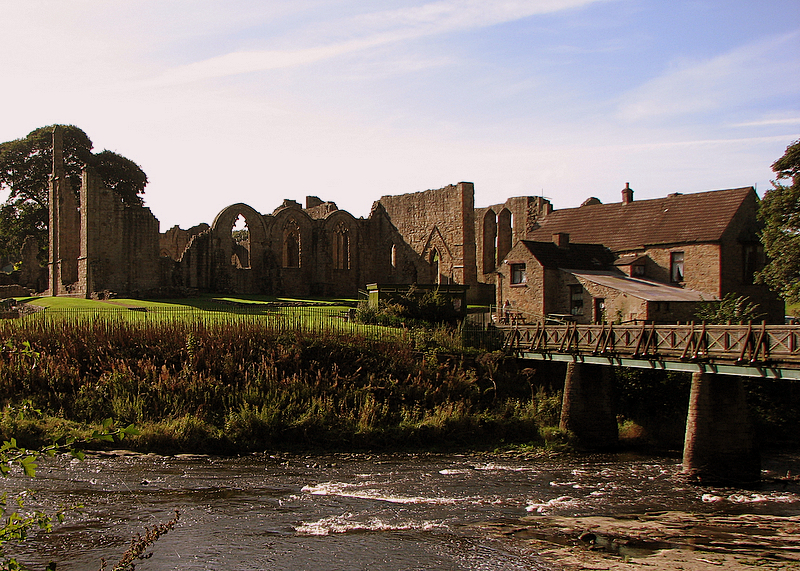
Finchale Priory on the River Wear on the site of Godric's hermitage

Reginald describes Godric's physical attributes:

For he was vigorous and strenuous in mind, whole of limb and strong in body. He was of middle stature, broad-shouldered and deep-chested, with a long face, grey eyes most clear and piercing, bushy brows, a broad forehead, long and open nostrils, a nose of comely curve, and a pointed chin. His beard was thick, and longer than the ordinary, his mouth well-shaped, with lips of moderate thickness; in youth his hair was black, in age as white as snow; his neck was short and thick, knotted with veins and sinews; his legs were somewhat slender, his instep high, his knees hardened and horny with frequent kneeling; his whole skin rough beyond the ordinary, until all this roughness was softened by old age.

St Godric is perhaps best remembered for his kindness toward animals, and many stories recall his protection of the creatures who lived near his forest home. According to one of these, he hid a stag from pursuing hunters; according to another, he even allowed snakes to warm themselves by his fire. Godric lived on a diet of herbs, wild honey, acorns, crab-apples and nuts. He slept on the bare ground.

Reginald of Durham recorded four songs of St Godric's: they are the oldest songs in English for which the original musical settings survive. Reginald describes the circumstances in which Godric learnt the first song. In a vision the Virgin Mary appeared to Godric with at her side "two maidens of surpassing beauty clad in shining white raiments." They pledged to come to his aid in times of need; and the Virgin herself taught Godric a song of consolation to overcome grief or temptation (Saintë Marië Virginë).

The novel Godric (1981) by Frederick Buechner is a fictional retelling of his life and travels. It was a finalist for a Pulitzer Prize.

A tune named for him by its composer, John Bacchus Dykes, appears in dozens of hymnals.
