= Bellingham Town Hall =

Municipal building in Bellingham, Northumberland, England

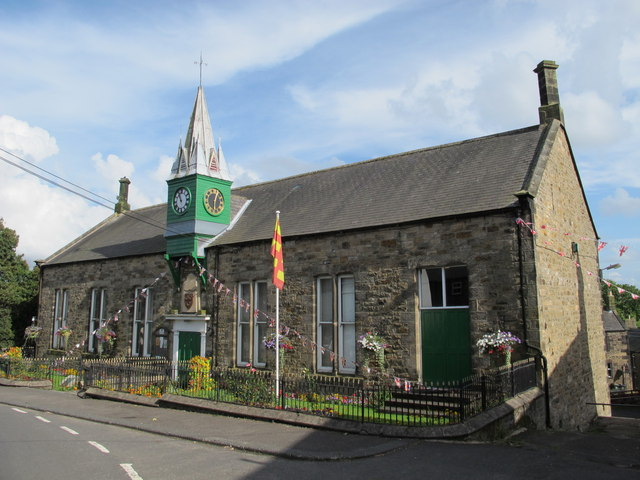
- Bellingham Town Hall

- Shown in Northumberland
- 55.1435°N 2.2555°W
- Location: Front Street, Bellingham

History
- Built: 1862

Site notes
- Architectural style: Gothic Revival style

Listed Building – Grade II
- Official name: Town Hall
- Designated: 7 March 1985
- Reference no.: 1153580

Bellingham Town Hall is a municipal building in Front Street in Bellingham, Northumberland, England. The building, which is the meeting place of Bellingham Parish Council, is a Grade II listed building.

== History ==
In the mid-19th century, the local community in Bellingham decided to raise money, through public subscription, concerts and other local fundraising initiatives, for a local events venue. The site they chose was a place formerly known as Mug Hill where markets had once been held. The new building was designed in the Gothic Revival style, built in ashlar stone and was officially opened on 3 March 1862.

The design involved a symmetrical main frontage with seven bays facing onto Front Street; the central bay featured a doorway flanked by Tuscan order pilasters supporting a frieze and a cornice. Above the door, there was a panel bearing the coat of arms of the town and, above that, there was a wooden clock turret with a spire and corner spirelets. The turret was donated by the main families of the area: the Armstrongs, the Charltons, the Dodds and the Milburns. The other bays were fenestrated by two-light sash windows, although the window in the right hand bay was later replaced with a doorway. Internally, the principal room was the main hall. The architectural historian, Nikolaus Pevsner, liked the design of the clock turret which he described as "playful".

In the early 20th century, a local naval officer, Commander Edward Charlton, presented a gingal to the parish council which was duly placed outside the town hall: he had captured it during an attack on the northwest Taku Fort while serving on the cruiser, HMS Orlando, in June 1900 during the Boxer Rebellion. A memorial, in the form of a fountain sheltering a figure of a soldier, which was designed to commemorate the lives of local service personnel who died in the Second Boer War was initially unveiled at the cross roads in the middle of Bellingham in 1902 but later relocated to a site just to the northeast of the town hall.

In the 1960s, the town hall accommodated a cinema which was managed by the town hall committee and, in 1964, the rock band, The Animals, performed their folk rock hit, The House of the Rising Sun, for the first time at the town hall. The building also continued to serve as the meeting place of the parish council into the 21st century, as well as being the location of the local community library.

Following the disruption to power supplies caused by Storm Arwen in November 2021, a meeting was held with residents at the town hall to review the response and it was subsequently agreed that the town hall would be made available as a refuge for residents in case of future disruption caused by storms.
