= Holiday Park (Durham) =

Sports venue in Durham, England (1923–1954)

- Interactive map of Holiday Park
- Location: Durham, England
- Coordinates: 54.7807°N 1.5769°W
- Record attendance: 7,182
- Surface: Grass
- Opened: 1923

Tenants
- Durham City (1923–1939); Greyhound racing (1937–1954)

Holiday Park was a football ground and greyhound racing stadium in Durham in England. It was the home ground of Durham City between 1923 and 1939.

== History ==
Holiday Park opened in 1923 when Durham City left their Kepier Haughs ground. The club brought the wooden seated stand from the previous ground, which remained the only spectator facility at Holiday Park during the club's spell in the Football League. The first League match at the ground was played on 1 September 1923, with 4,000 spectators watching a 0–0 draw with Rochdale. The ground's record attendance of 7,182 was set soon afterwards for an FA Cup qualifying match against West Stanley on 17 September 1923.

Durham were voted out of the Football League in 1928 and the last Football League match was played at Holiday Park on 5 May that year, when 5,000 spectators saw Durham beat Crewe Alexandra 5–1. In 1937 a new 2,000 capacity stand was built as the ground was adapted for greyhound racing, which started on 23 October that year. Racing ended in 1954. This involved reducing the size of the pitch, and ultimately caused Durham City to fold in 1938. The ground was subsequently expanded as it continued to be used for greyhound racing, but was later demolished and the site used by the electricity board.
