= Uthred of Boldon =

English Benedictine monk, theologian and writer

Personal life
- Born: c. 1320; Boldon, North Durham
- Died: 28 January 1397; Finchale Abbey

Religious life
- Religion: Benedictine

Uthred or Uhtred of Boldon (also spelled Owtred; c. 1320 – 28 January 1397) was an English Benedictine monk, theologian and writer, born at Boldon, North Durham; he died at Finchale Abbey.

== Life ==
Uhtred joined the Benedictine community of Durham Abbey about 1332 and was sent to London in 1337. Three years later he entered Durham College, Oxford, a house which the Durham Benedictines had established at Oxford for those of their members who pursued their studies at the University of Oxford. He was graduated there as licentiate in 1352 and as doctor in 1357. During the succeeding ten years, and even previously, he took part in numerous disputations at Oxford University, many of which were directed against members of the mendicant orders. It is on this account that John Bale wrongly designates him as a supporter of John Wycliffe.

In 1367 Uhtred became prior of Finchale Abbey, a position to which he was appointed three other times, in 1379, 1386, and 1392. In 1368 and in 1381 he served as subprior at Durham Abbey. Along with Wycliffe he was one of the delegates sent by King Edward III to the papal representatives at Bruges in 1374, with the purpose of reaching an agreement concerning the vexed question of canonical provision in England.

According to the Eulogium Historiarum, Uthred represented Durham Abbey at a 1374 council in Westminster held by Edward, Prince of Wales. Historians including James Tait and Aubrey Gwynn have questioned whether such a council actually took place, although Jeremy Catto argues for its plausibility. As described in the Eulogium, the council was held for the purpose of determining whether the king was obliged to recognize the papal suzerainty which had been granted to Innocent III by King John. Uthred is depicted as initially defending the pope's right of overlordship, but changing his vote on the next day to follow that of the council.

== Works ==
Uhtred's writings included:

- De substantialibus regulae monachalis, preserved in the Durham Cathedral Library;
- Contra querelas Fratrum, written about 1390, extant in the British Library; and
- a Latin translation of the Ecclesiastical History of Eusebius, also preserved in the British Library.
