= Waldric =

Lord Chancellor
- In office 1102–1107
- Monarch: Henry I of England
- Preceded by: Roger of Salisbury
- Succeeded by: Ranulf

Waldric (aka Gaudry, died 1112) was the eighth Lord Chancellor and Lord Keeper of England, from 1103 to 1107. He was also Bishop of Laon from 1106 to 1112. He had been a royal chaplain as early as 3 September 1101.

At the battle of Tinchebray (1106), Orderic Vitalis states, Waldric capellanus regis captured Robert Curthose, Henry I of England's brother and leader of the opposing forces as Duke of Normandy.

As bishop he was greedy and violent, unconventional in his habits and joking, a prodigal spender on himself; he is portrayed in very unflattering terms in the 1115 chronicle Monodiae of Guibert of Nogent. He had Gerard of Quierzy murdered in the very cathedral of Laon.

His election as bishop was contested; he had been hurried into minor orders after the battle and made a canon of Rouen, but it was upheld by Pope Paschal II at the Council of Langres. He was murdered at Eastertide 1112, in the crypt of Laon Cathedral by citizens of Laon who had set up a commune in the city. Guibert's account of this event alludes to Isengrin, making it of literary-historical value.

== Notes ==
Political offices
Preceded by Roger of Salisbury	Lord Chancellor; 1102–1107	Succeeded by Ranulf
Catholic Church titles
Preceded by Enguerrand	Bishop of Laon; 1107–1112	Succeeded by Hugo
