= Geoffrey Rufus =

12th-century Bishop of Durham and Chancellor of England

- Bishop of Durham
- Appointed: c. 14 May 1133
- Installed: 10 August 1133
- Term ended: 6 May 1141
- Predecessor: Ranulf Flambard
- Successor: William Cumin

Orders
- Consecration: 6 August 1133

Personal details
- Died: 6 May 1141
- Buried: Durham Cathedral in the chapter house
- Denomination: Catholic

Lord Chancellor
- In office 1123–1133
- Monarch: Henry I of England
- Preceded by: Ranulf
- Succeeded by: Robert de Sigello

Geoffrey Rufus, also called Galfrid Rufus (died 6 May 1141) was a medieval Bishop of Durham and Lord Chancellor of England.

== Life ==
Rufus' parentage and upbringing is unknown. The origin of the nickname "Rufus" has not been discovered either. He was a royal clerk before being named the tenth Lord Chancellor and Lord Keeper of England, from 1123 to 1133. Geoffrey had also worked for the previous chancellor Ranulf. He may have started his career as a clerk for Roger of Salisbury, King Henry I of England's chief minister, for he first appears as a witness to a charter of Roger's in 1114. From charter evidence, it appears that Rufus was often in England, even when King Henry was in Normandy. In the Pipe Roll of 1130, he had custody of more royal land than any other official. After Geoffrey became a bishop, the king chose to keep the office of chancellor vacant until the king's death. The functions of the office were performed by the head of the scriptorium, Robert de Sigello.

Rufus was nominated to the see of Durham about 14 May 1133, and consecrated on 6 August 1133. He was enthroned on 10 August 1133. The see had been vacant since 1128. Geoffrey at first quarrelled with his cathedral chapter, but peace was restored when the bishop allowed the monks their privileges. Geoffrey was also a benefactor to Newminster Abbey. During Rufus' episcopate, the chapterhouse at Durham was completed. Rufus also employed as a clerk William Cumin, who after Rufus' death conspired with King David I of Scotland to seize the see of Durham.

When King Stephen took the throne at the death of King Henry, Rufus acknowledged Stephen as king, but did not attend the royal court often. In 1136, a peace treaty between King David and King Stephen was signed at Durham, but in 1138 Rufus' castle of Norham surrendered to King David, an act that brought condemnation to the bishop for failing to defend the castle adequately. Geoffrey, however, refused David's offer to return Norham to Geoffrey in return for repudiating Stephen. In retaliation, Norham was destroyed. Geoffrey does not seem to have supported either side at the Battle of the Standard in August 1138. At the end of Rufus' life, because of King David's invasion of northern England in support of the Empress Matilda, most of the diocese was under the control of the Scottish king.

Rufus died on 6 May 1141. Rufus was married and had at least one daughter, who married Robert of Amundeville. His son Geoffrey seems not to have been involved in politics, although he held an estate in Dorset of 18 and a half hides. His grave was identified and excavated in the 19th century inside Durham Chapter House.

== Citations ==
Political offices
| Preceded by Ranulf | Lord Chancellor; 1123–1133 | Succeeded by Robert de Sigello (Keeper of the Great Seal) |
Catholic Church titles
| Preceded by Ranulf Flambard | Bishop of Durham; 1133–1141 | Succeeded by William Cumin |
