= St Cuthbert's Well =

Ancient well in Bellingham, Northumberland, England

Coordinates: 55°8′34.397″N 2°15′21.708″W

Cuddy's Well, Bellingham

St Cuthbert's Well, known locally as Cuddy's Well, is an ancient holy well in the village of Bellingham, adjacent to St Cuthbert's Church, an eleventh-century church associated with the cult of the seventh century monk, bishop and hermit St Cuthbert.

Sed nullius Sanctorum Dei memoria eis magis innotuit, quam Beati Cuthberti gloriosi Confessoris, cujus venerationi sollemni ecclesiola in eadem villula dedicata fuit. Infirmantem igitur ad ecclesiam producunt, et pii Confessoris clementiam lacrimosis desideriorum votis exposcunt. Nunc de fonte, qui Sancti Cuthberti dicitur, aquas exhauriunt, et ori languentis vel manui contractae perfundunt, modo altaris sullimia adeunt, quandoque curvante poplite solotenus prostrati Domini clementiam implorarunt.

— Extract from first miracle, CVIII, Libellus, Reginald of Durham

Three miracles at Bellingham, connected with the mediaeval cult of St Cuthbert, are recorded in the twelfth century Libellus of Reginald of Durham. They concern Sproich, a poor but pious man employed as a bridge-builder by the Almoner of Durham. In the first miracle, after Sproich's daughter Eda stays away from church to sew a dress on the feast day of St Lawrence, her left hand becomes paralysed, clutching the dress. She is miraculously cured by an apparition of St Cuthbert after drinking water from the well. In the second, on the occasion of Eda's marriage, Sproich's cow is seized in payment by a bailiff of the local lord and placed with another tenant. whose house is later struck by lightning. The cow is miraculously spared. In the third, a thief called Walter of Flanders and his accomplice, who have stolen Sproich's axe, are fatally attacked by the head and the handle of the axe.

The well, in a lane next to St Cuthbert's Church, is now directed through a Georgian conduit, known locally as a pant. The water is still used for baptisms. According to local tradition St Cuthbert originally discovered the source of the well.
