= Cuthbert =

Anglo-Saxon bishop and saint (c. 634–687)

Saint Cuthbert
- Cuthbert discovers a piece of timber, from a 12th-century manuscript of Bede's Life of St Cuthbert

Bishop, Confessor
- Born: c. 634; Dunbar, Kingdom of Northumbria (now in modern-day southern Scotland)
- Died: 20 March 687; Inner Farne, Kingdom of Northumbria (now in modern-day Northern England)
- Venerated in: Catholic Church; Anglicanism; Eastern Orthodox Church; Church of Scotland
- Major shrine: Durham Cathedral, Kingdom of Northumbria (now in modern-day Northern England)
- Feast: 20 March, Catholic Church, Eastern Orthodox Church, Episcopal Church; 4 September (Catholic Ordinariates)
- Attributes: Bishop holding a second crowned head in his hands; sometimes accompanied by seabirds and animals
- Patronage: Kingdom of Northumbria, Diocese of Hexham and Newcastle

Cuthbert (Note: The Oxford Dictionary of National Biography entry is simply "Cuthbert", as is the entry for the Oxford Dictionary of Saints and the entry in the Blackwell Encyclopaedia of Anglo-Saxon England. He is called "Cuthbert of Lindisfarne" by Michael Walsh in A New Dictionary of Saints. His name in Old English was Cūþbeorht and in Latin Cuthbertus.) (/ˈkʌθ.bɜːrt/) (c. 634 – 20 March 687) was a saint of the early Northumbrian church in the Celtic tradition. He was a monk, bishop and hermit, associated with the monasteries of Melrose and Lindisfarne in the Kingdom of Northumbria, (Note: Cuthbert came from the Bernicia part of the new Northumbrian kingdom, which was finally united in 634 around the time of his birth.) a nation that covered the entirety of modern day southern Scotland and Northern England. Saint Cuthbert after his death was to become the patron saint of the kingdom of Northumbria.

Both during his life and after his death, he became a popular medieval saint of Northern England, with a cult centred on his tomb at Durham Cathedral. Cuthbert is regarded as the patron saint of Northumbria. His feast days are 20 March (Catholic Church, Church of England, Eastern Orthodox Church, Episcopal Church) and 4 September (Church in Wales, Catholic Church).

Cuthbert grew up in or around Lauderdale, near Old Melrose Abbey, a daughter-house of Lindisfarne, today in Scotland. He decided to become a monk after seeing a vision on the night in 651 that Aidan, the founder of Lindisfarne, died, but he seems to have experienced some period of military service beforehand. He was made guest-master at the new monastery at Ripon, soon after 655, but had to return with Eata of Hexham to Melrose when Wilfrid was given the monastery instead. About 662 he was made prior at Melrose, and around 665 went as prior to Lindisfarne. In 684 he was made bishop of Lindisfarne. By late 686 he resigned and returned to his hermitage as he felt he was about to die. He was probably in his early 50s.

== Life ==
=== Origins and background ===
Cuthbert was born (perhaps into a noble family) in Dunbar, in Northumbria, and now in East Lothian, Scotland, in the mid-630s, some ten years after the conversion of King Edwin of Northumbria to Christianity in 627, which was slowly followed by that of the rest of his people. The politics of the kingdom were violent, and there were later episodes of pagan rule, while spreading understanding of Christianity through the kingdom was a task that lasted throughout Cuthbert's lifetime. Edwin had been baptised by Paulinus of York, a Roman who had come with the Gregorian mission from Rome, but his successor Oswald also invited Irish monks from Iona in the Gaelic kingdom of Dál Riata to found the monastery at Lindisfarne where Cuthbert was to spend much of his life. This was around 635, about the time Cuthbert was born.

The tension between the Roman and Celtic Christianity, often exacerbated by Cuthbert's near-contemporary Wilfrid, an intransigent and quarrelsome supporter of Roman ways, was to be a major feature of Cuthbert's lifetime. Cuthbert himself, though educated in the Celtic tradition, followed his mentor Eata in accepting the Roman forms, apparently without difficulty, after the Synod of Whitby in 664. (Note: At least Bede records no reluctance, though Farmer and others suspect he may be being less than frank in this, as a partisan of Jarrow.) The earliest biographies concentrate on the many miracles that accompanied even his early life, but he was evidently indefatigable as a travelling priest spreading the Christian message to remote villages, and also well able to impress royalty and nobility. Unlike Wilfrid, his style of life was austere, and when he could, he lived the life of a hermit, though still receiving many visitors.

In Cuthbert's time the Kingdom of Northumbria included, in modern terms, northern England as well as southern Scotland at least to the Firth of Forth. Cuthbert may have been from the neighbourhood of Dunbar at the mouth of the Firth of Forth in modern-day Scotland, though The Lives of the Fathers, Martyrs and Other Principal Saints ("Butler's Lives"), by Alban Butler records that he was fostered as a child near Melrose. Fostering is possibly a sign of noble birth, as are references to his riding a horse when young. One night while still a boy, employed as a shepherd, he had a vision of the soul of Aidan being carried to heaven by angels, and later found out that Aidan had died that night. Edwin Burton finds it a suggestion of lowly parentage that as a boy he used to tend sheep on the hills near that monastery. He appears to have undergone military service, but at some point he joined the very new monastery at Melrose, under the prior Boisil. Upon Boisil's death in 661, Cuthbert succeeded him as prior. Cuthbert was possibly a second cousin of King Aldfrith of Northumbria (according to Irish genealogies), which may explain his later proposal that Aldfrith should be crowned as monarch.

=== Career ===
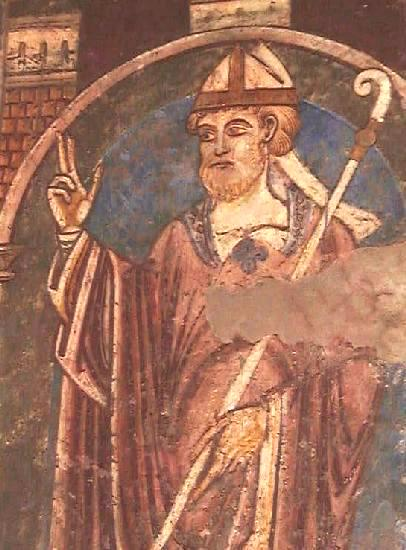
12th-century wall-painting of St Cuthbert in Durham Cathedral

Cuthbert's fame for piety, diligence, and obedience grew. When Alchfrith, king of Deira, founded a new monastery at Ripon, Cuthbert became its praepositus hospitum or guest master under Eata. When Wilfrid was made abbot of the monastery, Eata and Cuthbert returned to Melrose. Illness struck the monastery in 664 and while Cuthbert recovered, the prior died and Cuthbert was made prior in his place. He spent much time among the people, ministering to their spiritual needs, carrying out missionary journeys, and preaching.

After the Synod of Whitby, Cuthbert seems to have accepted the Roman customs, and his old abbot Eata called on him to introduce them at Lindisfarne as prior there. His asceticism was complemented by his charm and generosity to the poor, and his reputation for gifts of healing and insight led many people to consult him, gaining him the name of "Wonder Worker of Britain". He continued his missionary work, travelling the breadth of the country from Berwick to Galloway to carry out pastoral work and founding an oratory at Dull, Scotland, complete with a large stone cross, and a little cell for himself. He is also said to have founded St Cuthbert's Church in Edinburgh.

=== Hermit's life ===
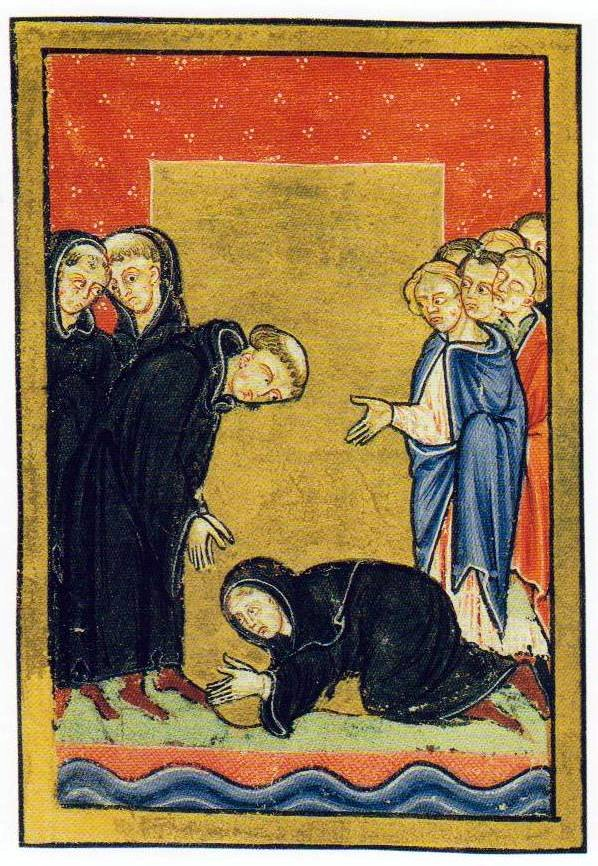
Cuthbert meets Ælfflæd of Whitby on Coquet Island, Bede's Life of Cuthbert, 12th century

Cuthbert retired in 676, moved by the desire for a more contemplative life. With his abbot's leave, he moved to a spot which Archbishop Eyre identifies with St Cuthbert's Island near Lindisfarne, but which Raine thinks was near Holburn, at a place now known as St Cuthbert's Cave. Shortly afterwards, Cuthbert moved to Inner Farne island, two miles from Bamburgh, where he gave himself up to a life of great austerity. At first he received visitors, but later he confined himself to his cell and opened his window only to give his blessing. He could not refuse an interview with the holy abbess and royal virgin Elfleda, the daughter of King Oswiu of Northumbria, who succeeded St Hilda as abbess of Whitby in 680. The meeting was held on Coquet Island, further south.

=== Election as Bishop, Lindisfarne and death ===
In 684, Cuthbert was elected Bishop of Hexham at a synod at Twyford (believed to be present-day Alnmouth), but was reluctant to leave his retirement and take up his charge; it was only after a visit from a large group, including King Ecgfrith, that he agreed to return and take up the duties of bishop, but instead as Bishop of Lindisfarne, swapping with Eata, who went to Hexham in Cuthbert's place. Cuthbert was consecrated at York by Archbishop Theodore and six bishops, on 26 March 685. But after Christmas 686, he returned to his cell on Inner Farne Island, where he died on 20 March 687, after a painful illness. He was buried at Lindisfarne the same day, and after long journeys escaping the Danes his remains were rested at Chester-Le-Street, though were moved in a short while to settle at Durham, causing the foundation of the city and Durham Cathedral. The St Cuthbert Gospel is among the objects later recovered from St Cuthbert's coffin, which is also an important artefact.

== Legacy ==
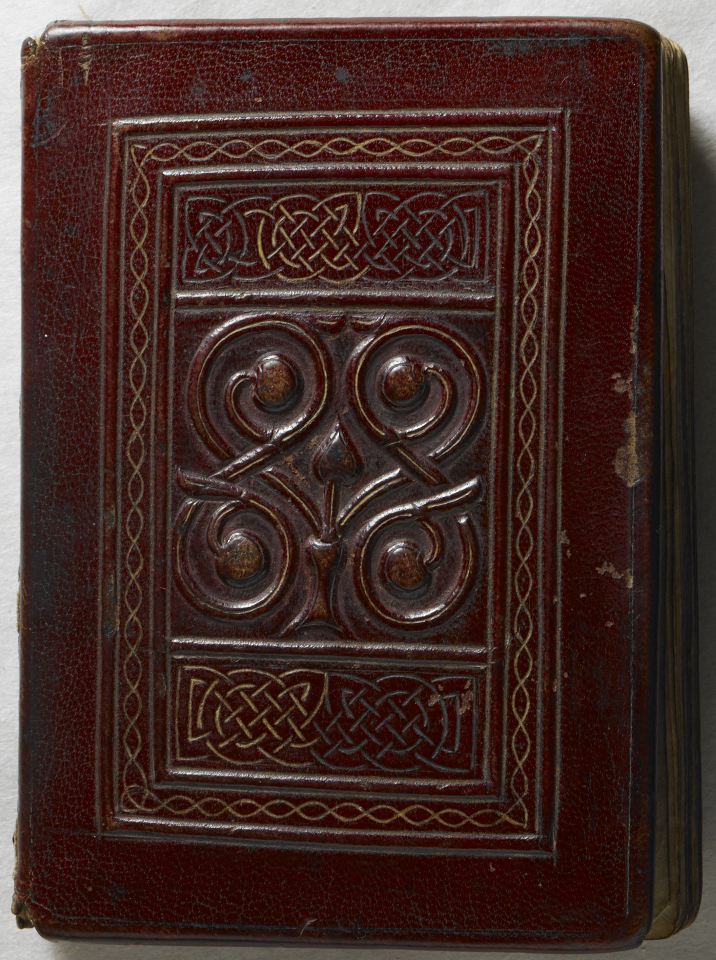
The front cover of the St Cuthbert Gospel of St John, recovered from his coffin; the original tooled red goatskin binding is the earliest surviving Western binding.

After Cuthbert's death, numerous miracles were attributed to his intercession and to intercessory prayer near his remains. In particular, Alfred the Great, King of Wessex, was inspired and encouraged in his struggle against the Danes by a vision or dream he had of Cuthbert. Thereafter, the royal house of Wessex, who became the kings of England, made a point of devotion to Cuthbert, which also gave a useful political message. Cuthbert was "a figure of reconciliation and a rallying point for the reformed identity of Northumbria.." after the absorption of the Danish populations, as Michelle Brown puts it. The 8th-century historian Bede wrote both a verse and a prose life of St Cuthbert around 720. He has been described as "perhaps the most popular saint in Britain prior to the death of Thomas Becket in 1170." In 698, Cuthbert was reburied at Lindisfarne in the decorated oak coffin now usually meant by St Cuthbert's coffin, though he was to have many more coffins. (Note: Cronyn and Horie, 5–7, are the easiest guide to this very complicated history, or see Battiscombe 1956, pp. 2–22 and Ernst Kitzinger's chapter on the coffin. Bede, chapter 42 is the primary source.) In 995, the "community of Cuthbert" founded and settled at Durham, guided by what they thought was the will of the saint, as the wagon carrying his coffin back to Chester-le-Street after a temporary flight from a Danish invasion became stuck hard on the road.

During the medieval period, Cuthbert became important in defining the identity of the people living in Northumbria north of Tees. Symeon noted that it was the 'people of St Cuthbert', that is, 'the whole people between the river Tees and the river Tweed', who waged an unsuccessful campaign against the Scots at the Battle of Carham in 1018. By the later 11th century the Northumbrian Bishops of Durham had established a semi-autonomous region known as the Liberty of Durham, later the Palatinate of Durham, between the Tyne and Tees. Within this area the Bishop of Durham had almost as much power as the king of the English himself, and the saint became a powerful symbol of the autonomy the region enjoyed. The inhabitants of the Palatinate became known as the haliwerfolc, which roughly translates as "people of the saint", and Cuthbert gained a reputation as fiercely protective of his domain. For example, there is a story that at the Battle of Neville's Cross in 1346, the Prior of the Abbey at Durham received a vision of Cuthbert, ordering him to take the corporal cloth of the saint and raise it on a spear point near the battlefield as a banner. Doing this, the Prior and his monks found themselves protected "by the mediation of holy St Cuthbert and the presence of the said holy Relic". Whether the story of the vision is true or not, the banner of St Cuthbert was regularly carried in battle against the Scots until the Reformation, and it serves as a good example of how St Cuthbert was regarded as a protector of his people. A modern interpretation of the Banner, designed by Northumbria University academic Fiona Raeside-Elliott and embroidered by local textile artist Ruth O'Leary, is on display at the saint's shrine in Durham Cathedral.

Cuthbert's cult also appealed to the converted Danes, who made up much of the population of Kingdom of York, and was also adopted by the Normans when they invaded Britain. Cuthbert's shrine at Durham Cathedral was a major pilgrimage site throughout the Middle Ages, until stripped by Henry VIII's commissioners in the Dissolution of the Monasteries.

=== Relics ===
The incorrupt body of Cuthbert from Bede's Life of Cuthbert, 12th century

A woman praying at the location of St Cuthbert's tomb and reburial in Durham Cathedral; behind is a damaged statue of St Cuthbert, holding the head of the St Oswald (whose head was reburied with Cuthbert)

According to Bede's life of the saint, when Cuthbert's sarcophagus was opened eleven years after his death, his body was found to have been perfectly preserved or incorrupt. This apparent miracle led to the steady growth of Cuthbert's posthumous cultus, to the point where he became the most popular saint of Northumbria. Numerous miracles were attributed to his intercession and to intercessory prayer near his remains.

In 875 the Danes took the monastery of Lindisfarne and the monks fled, carrying St Cuthbert's body with them around various places including Melrose. After seven years' wandering it found a resting place at the still existing St Cuthbert's church in Chester-le-Street until 995, when another Danish invasion led to its removal to Ripon. Then the saint intimated, as it was believed, that he wished to remain in Durham. A new stone church—the so-called "White Church"—was built, the predecessor of the present grand Cathedral. In 999, his relics were enshrined in the new church on 4 September, which is kept as the feast of his translation at Durham Cathedral and as an optional memorial in the Catholic Church in England. In 1069 Bishop Æthelwine attempted to transport Cuthbert's body to Lindisfarne to escape from King William at the start of the Harrying of the North.

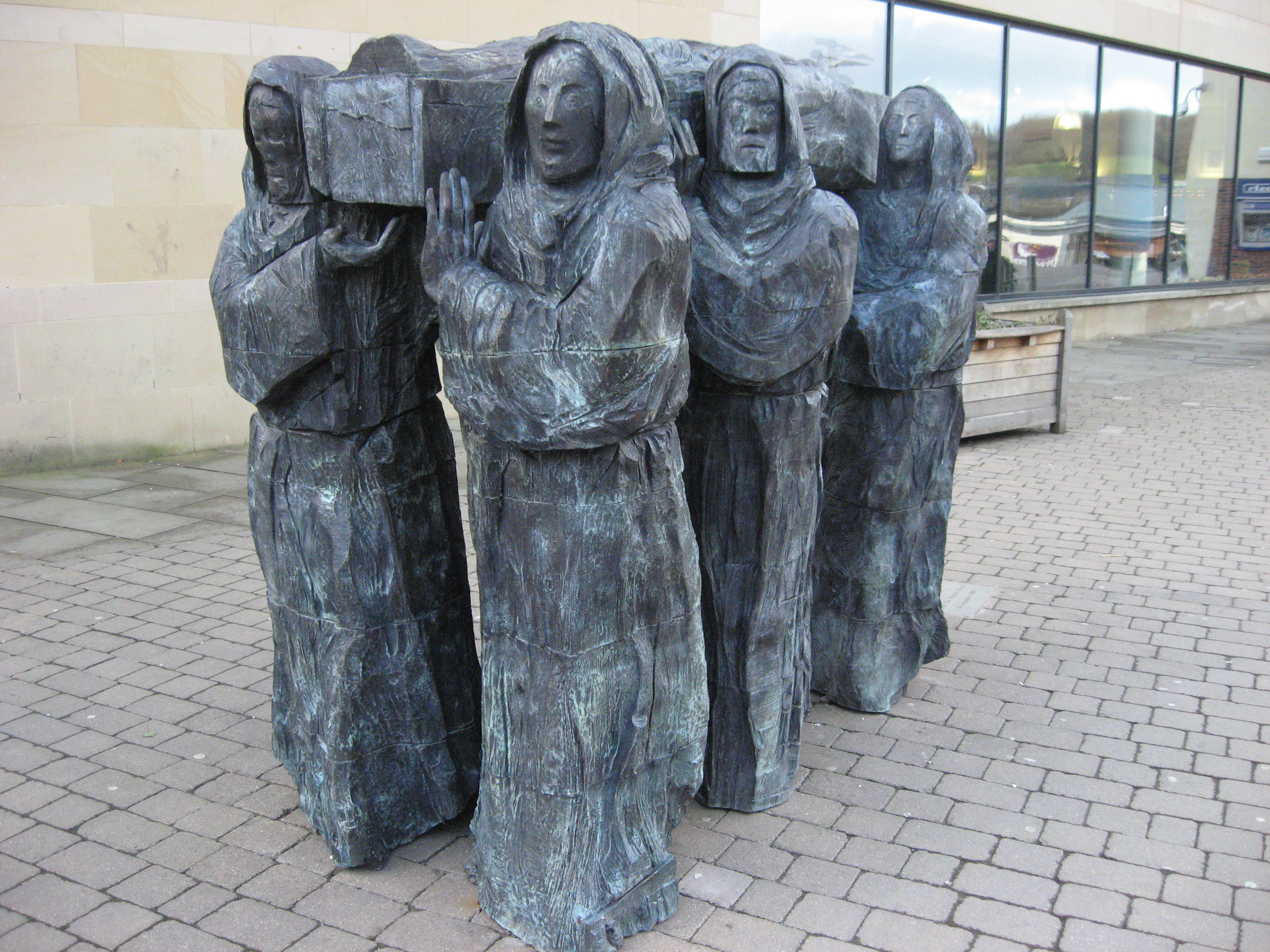
The Journey, a modern sculpture showing the travels of the Lindisfarne community, by Fenwick Lawson. Shown here in the Millennium Square, Durham.

In 1104 Cuthbert's tomb was opened again and his relics translated to a new shrine behind the altar of the recently completed Cathedral. When the casket was opened, a small book of the Gospel of John, measuring 138 by 92 millimetres (5.4 × 3.6 inches), now known as the Saint Cuthbert Gospel (British Library Additional MS 89000, formerly known as the Stonyhurst Gospel), was found. This is the oldest Western book to have retained its original bookbinding, in finely decorated leather. Also recovered much later were a set of vestments of 909–916, made of Byzantine silk with a "Nature Goddess" pattern, with a stole and decoration in extremely rare Anglo-Saxon embroidery or opus anglicanum, which had been deposited in his tomb by King Æthelstan (r. 927–939) on a pilgrimage while Cuthbert's shrine was at Chester-le-Street.

Cuthbert's shrine was destroyed in the Dissolution of the Monasteries, but, unusually, his relics survived and are still interred at the site, although they were also disinterred in the 19th century, when his wooden coffin and various relics were removed. St Cuthbert's coffin (actually one of a series of several coffins), as reconstructed by Ernst Kitzinger and others, remains at the cathedral and is an important rare survival of Anglo-Saxon carving on wood. When the coffin was last inspected on 17 May 1827, a 'Saxon' square cross of gold, embellished with garnets, in the characteristic splayed shape, used later as the heraldic emblem of St Cuthbert in the arms of Durham and Newcastle universities, was found.

=== Namesakes ===
Cross of Cuthbert

The flag of County Durham since 2013 features the Cross of St Cuthbert, counterchanged in the county colours of blue and gold. The flag of Kirkcudbrightshire in Scotland since 2016 likewise features the Cross of St Cuthbert, whose name is the origin of the county's name. The Cross of St Cuthbert features as the principal charge on the coat of arms of the University of Durham, granted in 1843, blazoned Argent, a Cross of St Cuthbert Gules, on a canton Azure, a chevron Or, between three lions rampant of the first ('A red Cross of St Cuthbert on a silver shield, with three silver fighting lions around a gold chevron on a blue square in the top left-hand corner'). The Cross also features in the arms of many of its constituent colleges. The University of Newcastle upon Tyne, formerly King's College in the University of Durham, also features St Cuthbert's Cross on its arms, granted in 1937. The Newcastle University arms are blazoned Azure, a Cross of St Cuthbert Argent, and on a chief of the last a lion passant guardant Gules. ('A silver Cross of St Cuthbert on a blue shield, with a red lion walking and looking towards you on the silver top third portion of the shield.') The cross of St Cuthbert also features on the badges of the two Anglican secondary schools in Tyne and Wear, namely Dame Allan's Schools and Sunderland High School.

St Cuthbert's Society, a college of Durham University established in 1888, is named after him and is located only a short walk from the coffin of the saint at Durham Cathedral. The Society celebrates St Cuthbert's Day on or around each 20 March with a feast. "Cuth's Day", the annual college day, is celebrated in the Easter term with music, entertainment, festivities and drinking. Cuddy's Corse is a waymarked walking route between Chester-le-Street and Durham Cathedral; it marks the journey between two of the last resting places of the coffin.

Worksop College, founded as St Cuthbert's in 1895, was the last of the Woodard Schools to be opened.

St Cuthbert is also the namesake of St Cuthbert's College in Epsom, New Zealand; St Cuthbert's Day on 21 March is a day of school celebration. The school's houses are named after important locations in the life of the saint: Dunblane (yellow), Elgin (green), Iona (purple), Kelso (blue), Lindisfarne (white), Melrose (red), York (orange) and Durham (pink).

St Cuthbert's High School, a Roman Catholic school in Newcastle upon Tyne, is named after the saint. St Cuthbert's Day is celebrated with Mass, and the school prayers include reference to their patron saint (always ending with the invocation "St Cuthbert, pray for us"). The school badge features a bishop's crook in reference to St Cuthbert's time as a bishop, as well as ducks. In Northumberland, the common eider is nicknamed Cuddy's duck after the saint.

Another Roman Catholic secondary school to bear the name of St Cuthbert is St Cuthbert's RC High School in Rochdale. Founded in 1968 as Bishop Henshaw School it was renamed to its current name in the late 1980s. The school's badge includes the St Cuthbert Cross and the motto "In Christ We Serve".

St Cuthbert's Co-operative Society (now Scotmid) opened its first shop in Edinburgh in 1859, and expanded to become one of the largest co-ops in Scotland. Its dairy used horse-drawn delivery floats until 1985, and between 1944 and 1959 employed as a milkman Sean Connery, who later played James Bond.

The Roman Catholic Diocese of Hexham and Newcastle holds St Cuthbert as its patron saint, with the consecration of bishops in the diocese always taking place on 20 March, Cuthbert's feast day in the Catholic Church.

An Orthodox Community based in Chesterfield and Sheffield, which were also part of the old kingdom of Northumbria has taken St Cuthbert as their patron.

Fossilised crinoid columnals extracted from limestone quarried on Lindisfarne, or found washed up along the foreshore, which were threaded into necklaces or rosaries, became known as St Cuthbert's beads.

In modern county of Northumberland, the common eider is known as Cuddy's duck, "Cuddy" being the familiar form of "Cuthbert". The common eider still breeds in their thousands off the Northumberland coast. Starting about 500 years after his death, stories began claiming that Cuthbert had decreed that the seabirds nesting on the islands should be protected. There is no evidence that he did this, and the story may have been created to explain why his body, sometime well after his death, had been wrapped in a piece of Sasanian silk embroidered with stylized images of a woman, fruit, and some animals, including ducks.

In Cumbria, the civil parish and hamlet of Holme St Cuthbert are named after him. It is a rural area, with one larger village and numerous smaller hamlets.

St Cuthbert's Way is a long-distance walking route, one of Scotland's Great Trails.

Cuthbert is remembered in the Church of England with a Lesser Festival on 20 March, or alternatively 4 September, including in the Roman Catholic Church in England.

=== Dedications ===
Churches are dedicated to St Cuthbert in the following places:

==== Scotland ====
- St Cuthbert's Church, Clydebank (Church of Scotland, now closed)
- St Cuthbert's Church, Colinton (Episcopal)
- St Cuthbert's Church, Dunoon (Church of Scotland, 1874, now demolished)
- St Cuthbert's Church, East Calder (medieval, now abandoned)
- St Cuthbert's Church, Edinburgh (medieval)
- St Cuthbert's Catholic Church, Edinburgh (Roman Catholic, 1896)
- St Cuthbert's Church, Galashiels (Church of Scotland, now closed)
- St Cuthbert's Church, Girvan (medieval, rebuilt 1884)
- St Cuthbert's Church, Glasgow (Church of Scotland, now closed)
- St Cuthbert's Church, Kirkcudbright
- St Cuthbert’s Church, Lockerbie (Church of Scotland, now closed)
- St Cuthbert's Church, Maxton (medieval, now closed)
- St Cuthbert's Church, Melrose (Roman Catholic)
- St Cuthbert's Church, Monkton (medieval, now closed)
- St Cuthbert's Church, Saltcoats (Church of Scotland, now closed)
- St Cuthbert's Church, Straiton (Church of Scotland)

==== Northumberland ====
- St Cuthbert's Church, Allendale (medieval, rebuilt 1874)
- St Cuthbert's Church, Amble (Church of England, 1870)
- Church of the Sacred Heart and St Cuthbert, Amble (Roman Catholic)
- St Cuthbert's Church, Bedlington (medieval)
- St Cuthbert's Church, Bellingham (medieval)
- St Cuthbert's Church, Beltingham (medieval)
- Church of Our Lady and St Cuthbert, Berwick-upon-Tweed (Roman Catholic)
- St Cuthbert's Parish Church, Blyth (Church of England, 1751, rebuilt 1892)
- St Cuthbert's Catholic Church, Blyth
- St Cuthbert's Church, Carham (medieval, rebuilt 1790)
- St Cuthbert's Church, Corsenside (medieval)
- St Cuthbert's Church, Elsdon (medieval)
- St Cuthbert's Church, Greenhead (1827)
- Church of Sts Oswald, Cuthbert & Alfwald, Halton
- St Cuthbert's Old Church, Haydon Bridge (medieval)
- St Cuthbert's New Church, Haydon Bridge (1796)
- St Cuthbert's Church, Hebron (medieval)
- St Cuthbert's Church, Norham (medieval)
- Church of Our Lady and St Cuthbert, Prudhoe (Roman Catholic)

==== Tyne and Wear ====
- St Cuthbert's Church, Bensham
- St Cuthbert's Church, Blaydon (Church of England, 1845)
- St Cuthbert's Church, Blucher (CoE)
- St Cuthbert's Church, Brunswick (Church of England, 1905)
- St Cuthbert's Church, East Rainton (CoE)
- St Cuthbert's Church, Hebburn (CoE)
- St Cuthbert's Church, Marley Hill (CoE)
- St Cuthbert's Church, North Kenton (Roman Catholic)
- St Cuthbert's Church, North Shields (Roman Catholic)
- St Cuthbert's Church, Red House (CoE)
- St Mark's and St Cuthbert's Church, South Shields (CoE)
- St Cuthbert's Church, Throckley (Roman Catholic)

==== Cumbria ====
- St Cuthbert's Church, Aldingham (medieval)
- St Cuthbert's Church, Bewcastle (medieval, rebuilt 1792)
- St Cuthbert's Church, Carlisle (medieval)
- St Cuthbert's Church, Cliburn (medieval)
- St Cuthbert's Church, Clifton (medieval)
- St Cuthbert's Church, Dufton (medieval, rebuilt 1784)
- St Cuthbert's Church, Edenhall (medieval)
- St Cuthbert's Church, Embleton (medieval, rebuilt 1806)
- St Cuthbert's Church, Great Salkeld (medieval)
- St Cuthbert's Church, Holme St Cuthbert (Church of England, 1845)
- St Cuthbert's Church, Kentmere (medieval, rebuilt 1866)
- St Cuthbert's Church, Kirkby Ireleth (medieval)
- St Cuthbert's Church, Kirklinton (medieval, rebuilt 1846)
- St Cuthbert's Church, Lorton (medieval, rebuilt 1809)
- St Cuthbert's Church, Milburn (medieval)
- St Cuthbert's Church, Nether Denton (medieval, rebuilt 1868)
- St Cuthbert's Church, Plumbland (medieval, rebuilt 1871)
- St Cuthbert's Church, Seascale (Church of England, 1881, rebuilt 1890)

==== County Durham ====
- St Cuthbert's Church, Billingham (medieval)
- St Mary and St Cuthbert's Church, Chester-le-Street (medieval)
- St Cuthbert's Catholic Church, Chester-le-Street
- St Cuthbert's Church, Cotherstone (Church of England, 1881)
- Church of Saints Joseph, Patrick and Cuthbert, Coxhoe (Roman Catholic)
- Church of Our Lady Immaculate and St Cuthbert, Crook (Roman Catholic)
- St Cuthbert's Church, Darlington (medieval)
- Cathedral Church of Christ, Blessed Mary the Virgin and St Cuthbert of Durham, Durham (medieval)
- St Cuthbert's Church, Durham (Roman Catholic, 1827)
- St Cuthbert's Church, Durham North End (Church of England)
- St Cuthbert's Church, Etherley (CoE)
- St Cuthbert's Church, Peterlee (CoE)
- St Cuthbert's Church, Redmarshall (medieval)
- St Cuthbert's Church, Satley (CoE)
- St Cuthbert's Church, Seaham (Roman Catholic)
- St Cuthbert's Church, Shadforth (CoE)
- St Cuthbert's Church, Shotley Bridge (CoE)
- St Cuthbert's Church, Stockton-on-Tees (Roman Catholic, 1958)

==== North Yorkshire ====
- St Cuthbert and St Mary's Church, Barton (medieval, rebuilt 1840)
- Priory Church of St Mary and St Cuthbert, Bolton Abbey (medieval)
- St Cuthbert's Church, Colburn (Church of England, 1957)
- St Cuthbert's Church, Crayke (medieval)
- St Cuthbert's Church, Forcett (medieval)
- St Cuthbert's Church, Kildale (medieval)
- St Cuthbert's Church, Kirkleatham (medieval)
- St Joseph and St Cuthbert's Church, Loftus (Roman Catholic)
- St Cuthbert's Church, Marton-in-Cleveland (medieval)
- St Cuthbert's Church, Middlesbrough (now closed)
- St Cuthbert's Church, Middleton-on-Leven (medieval, rebuilt 1789)
- St Cuthbert's Church, Ormesby (medieval)
- St Cuthbert's Church, Pateley Bridge (Church of England, 1827)
- St Cuthbert's Church, Sessay (medieval, rebuilt 1848)
- St Cuthbert's Church, Wilton (medieval)
- St Cuthbert's and St Oswald's Church, Winksley (Church of England, 1917)
- St Cuthbert's Church, York (medieval, now closed)

West Yorkshire

- St Cuthbert's Church, Ackworth (medieval)
- St Cuthbert's Church, Birkby (Church of England, 1920s)
- St Cuthbert's Church, Bradford (Roman Catholic, 1891)
- St Cuthbert's Church, Wrose (Church of England)

==== East Yorkshire ====
- St Cuthbert's Church, Burton Fleming (medieval)
- St Cuthbert's Church, Kingston-upon-Hull (Church of England)

==== South Yorkshire ====
- St Cuthbert's Church, Fishlake (medieval)
- St Cuthbert's Church, Herringthorpe (Church of England)
- St Cuthbert's Church, Sheffield (Church of England)

==== Lancashire ====
- St Cuthbert's Church, Burnley (Church of England)
- St Cuthbert's Church, Darwen (Church of England, 1878)
- St Cuthbert's Church, Halsall (medieval)
- St Cuthbert's Church, Lytham (medieval, rebuilt 1770, 1835)
- St Cuthbert's Church, North Meols (medieval)
- St Cuthbert's Church, Over Kellet (medieval)
- St Cuthbert's Church, Preston (Church of England)

==== Merseyside ====
- St Cuthbert's Church, Croxteth Park (Church of England, 1988)
- St Cuthbert's Church, Everton (Church of England, 1877, now closed)

==== Greater Manchester ====
- St Cuthbert's Church, Cheadle (Church of England)
- St Cuthbert's Church, Fitton Hill (Church of England)
- St Cuthbert's Church, Miles Platting (Church of England)
- St Cuthbert's Church, Pemberton (Roman Catholic)
- St Cuthbert's Church, Withington (Roman Catholic)

==== Cheshire ====
- Church of St Cuthbert by the Forest, Mouldsworth (Roman Catholic, 1955)

==== Derbyshire ====
- St Cuthbert's Church, Doveridge (medieval)

==== Nottinghamshire ====
- Priory Church of Our Lady and Saint Cuthbert, Worksop (medieval)

==== Lincolnshire ====
- St Cuthbert's Church, Brattleby (medieval)
- St Cuthbert's Church, Lincoln (medieval, now demolished)

Leicestershire

- St Cuthbert's Church, Great Glen

Shropshire

- St Cuthbert's Church, Clungunford
- St Cuthbert's Church, Donington (medieval)

==== West Midlands and Warwickshire ====
- St Cuthbert of Lindisfarne's Church, Castle Vale (CoE)
- St Cuthbert's Church, Princethorpe (CoE)
- St Cuthbert's Church, Shustoke (CoE)
- St Cuthbert's Church, Winson Green (Church of England, 1872, now closed)

==== Herefordshire ====
- St Cuthbert's Church, Holme Lacy (medieval)

Norfolk

- St Cuthbert's Church, Sprowston (CoE)
- St Cuthbert's Church, Thetford (CoE)

Hertfordshire

- St Cuthbert's Church, Rye Park, Hoddesdon (CoE)

Bedfordshire

- Church of the Sacred Heart of Jesus and St Cuthbert, Bedford (built 1847 as St Cuthbert's CoE, now Polish Roman Catholic)

==== London ====
- St Cuthbert's Church, Earl's Court (Church of England, 1887)
- St Cuthbert's Church, North Wembley (CoE)
- St Cuthbert's Church, West Hampstead (CoE)
- St Cuthbert's Church, Wood Green (CoE)

Devon

- St Cuthbert's Church, Widworthy (medieval)

==== Somerset and Bristol ====
- St Cuthbert's Church, Brislington (CoE)
- St Cuthbert's Church, Wells (medieval)

==== Dorset ====
- Old St Cuthbert's Church, Oborne (medieval, redundant)
- New St Cuthbert's Church, Oborne (Church of England, 1861)

Hampshire

- St Cuthbert's Church, Portsea Island (CoE)

Northern Ireland

- St Cuthbert's Church, Dunluce (Anglican, now ruined)

==== New Zealand ====
- St Cuthbert's Church, Collingwood (Anglican, 1873)
- St Cuthbert's Church, Governors Bay (Anglican, 1860, restored 2017)

United States

- St Cuthbert's Church, Hedgesville, WV (Russian Orthodox Outside Russia)
- St Cuthbert's Church, Houston, TX (Episcopal, 1979)

Canada

- St Cuthbert's Church, Delta, BC (Anglican)
- St Cuthbert's Church, Hamilton, ON (Presbyterian)
- St Cuthbert's Church, Leaside, ON (Anglican)
- St Cuthbert's Church, Northwest Cove, NS (Anglican)
- St Cuthbert's Church, Oakville, ON (Anglican, 1960)
- St Cuthbert's Church, St Teresa, PEI (Roman Catholic, 1846)
- St Cuthbert's Church, Winnipeg, MN (Anglican, 1900, closed)

== See also ==
- Vita Sancti Cuthberti
- Historia de Sancto Cuthberto
- St Cuthbert's Well in Bellingham, Northumberland
- Ushaw College (St Cuthbert's College, Ushaw) in County Durham
- Legend about his burial

== Citations ==
Christian titles
Preceded by Eata of Hexham	Bishop of Lindisfarne; 685–687	Succeeded by Eadberht
