= Belmont, County Durham =

Suburb of the City of Durham, England

Coordinates: 54.783°N 1.517°W

Belmont
- Location within County Durham
- Population: 8,881 (2011)
- OS grid reference: NZ305435
- Civil parish: Belmont
- Unitary authority: County Durham
- Ceremonial county: County Durham
- Region: North East
- Country: England
- Sovereign state: United Kingdom
- Post town: DURHAM
- Postcode district: DH1
- Dialling code: 0191
- Police: Durham
- Fire: County Durham and Darlington
- Ambulance: North East
- UK Parliament: City of Durham

Belmont is a suburb forming the north-eastern parts of the city of Durham, England. Belmont Parish covers four old coal mining villages of Belmont, Carrville, Broomside and Gilesgate Moor, which have been joined by industrial and suburban developments since the 1950s. As such Belmont can be used either to refer narrowly to the old village area, or the wider parish, particularly the parts (Belmont, Carrville and Broomside) to the east of the A1(M) motorway which bisects the area. At the 2011 census, the parish had a population of 8,881.

== History ==
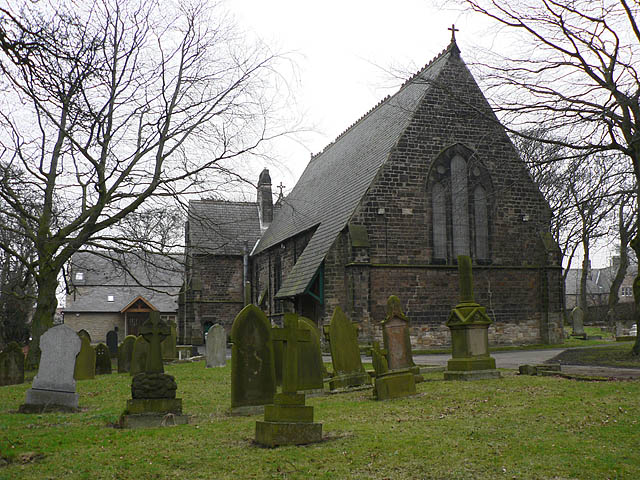
Church of St Mary Magdalene, Belmont

Belmont was a largely agricultural area within the parishes of St Giles Church, Durham and Pittington, but industrial developments - mainly coal mining - brought development through the second half of the nineteenth century. A number of collieries were sunk in the area and the largest, Belmont Colliery, took its name from the 1820s-built Belmont Hall (previously and now again known as 'Ramside Hall'). Belmont was surrounded by a number of other collieries, including Kepier Grange, Carrville, Dragonville, Broomside and Gilesgate Moor. These together formed the new Belmont Parish in 1852, and the boundaries of the Parish today still include these districts. However, by the late nineteenth century the majority of the collieries in this part of Durham had closed (although some small ones stayed open until the 1920s) and many of the houses built just decades earlier were demolished. The Grange Ironworks became the main employer in the villages, but in the absence of the coalmines the villages did not grow significantly and even saw some population loss through this time. The Ironworks too closed in the 1920s.

Belmont, Broomside, Carrville and Gilesgate Moor were still village-like until the 1950s, when significant expansion of suburban housing in Durham City occurred.

== Geography ==
The High Grange Estate in Gilesgate Moor, built in the 1960s, greatly expanded the north and western parts of the parish and filled in some of the area between Gilesgate and Belmont village, though the A1 motorway, which opened in 1965, had the effect of splitting the parish somewhat, cutting off the eastern part (Belmont, Carrville and Broomside) from the western parts (Gilsegate Moor and High Grange).

Further significant suburban developments in Belmont and Carrville, particularly to the south of Broomside Lane, grew the area's population between 1970 and 2000, while the Dragonville area of Gilesgate Moor saw first industrial and then later retail growth from the 1970s onwards; today the district is home to a number of large shopping centres and supermarkets. Belmont Community Centre, with a small park, was constructed in 1971 and provides a hub for community activities, including the home of the parish council.

To the north of the area, Belmont Business Park with New Ferens Park football stadium opened in 1995, and this site has continued to grow with further industrial developments into the 2010s.

== Economy ==
=== Television manufacture ===
Mullard constructed a television tube plant from late 1970, opening in 1972, being built by Gilbert-Ash for £2.5m, being 30 acres. It had made 2m colour tubes by late 1974.

Another plant of Mullard was built at Simonstone, Lancashire near Burnley. Thorn EMI closed their Skelmersdale plant in 1976. By 1977 Mullard was the only television tube manufacturer in the UK. The earlier Southampton Mullard site, on the Millbrook Trading Estate, developed infrared detectors; part of this moved to NXP Semiconductors at Romsey.

Prince Edward, Duke of Kent visited the factory in November 1983. There were 1,200 workers. As Mullard Colour Tubes, it became Philips Components Ltd in 1988. Conservative business minister Michael Heseltine visited on February 10 1995, to open a new site, and later went to Business Link in Sunderland.

It became LG Philips Displays, by a merger, in 2001, with another site on the Stephenson Industrial Estate in Washington, Tyne and Wear. Production at Washington moved to China in 2012, and production at Durham had moved to China by 2014.

== Facilities ==
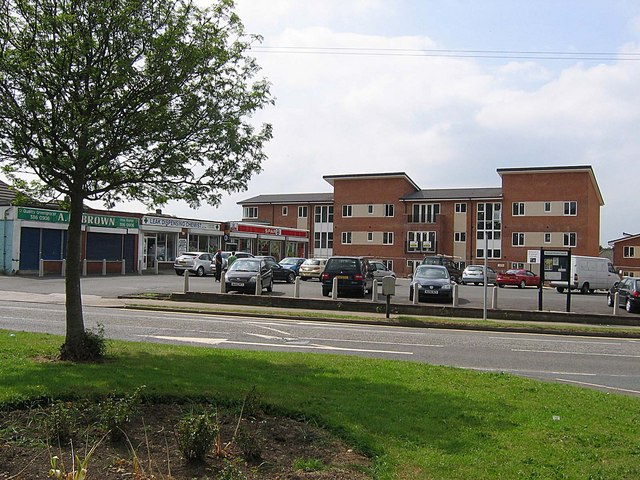
Blue House Shops, Carville

Belmont Community School is the local secondary school, with several primary schools in the Parish.

The main bus routes from Sunderland and Seaham to Durham run through Belmont, providing regular services into the city centre. Belmont Park and Ride opened by the A1 Motorway junction in the Carrville area in 2004. The western part of the parish has a large number of retail and shopping outlets. There are four pubs: the Travellers Rest in Broomside, The Belmont in Belmont, Broomside Park on the Belmont Business Park, and the Gilesgate Moor. There is a small library in Broomside.

== Sport ==
Since 1995 Belmont has been the site of New Ferens Park. This has hosted numerous different football teams, most notably Durham City from 1995 to 2015, Durham Women from 2014 to 2020, and Sunderland reserves for a period in the 2000s.

Belmont now (2025), boasts a comprehensive network of football clubs playing under 'Belmont United FC'. Belmont United FC have 23 children's teams, playing between the ages of 5–17 in various leagues over the county. They also have one adults team who compete in the Wearside Football League and host their home games at the afore mentioned New Ferens Park.

On the site of present-day housing south of Broomside Lane and on the east side of the cemetery was Belmont Stadium, which existed as a greyhound racing stadium from 1940 until 1969.

== In popular culture ==
- Get Carter - "Beechcroft", a house on Broomside Lane, was used as a location in the 1971 film as the home of character Cliff Brumby. It was here that Michael Caine as Jack Carter delivered the oft-quoted line "You’re a big man, but you’re out of shape." Despite a campaign to preserve it, the house was demolished in 2008.
- Belmont Stadium was used in the 1954 film The Gay Dog.
