= Gilesgate =

Coordinates: 54.783°N 1.517°W

- Location within County Durham
- Population: 6,746 (2021)
- Unitary authority: County Durham
- Ceremonial county: County Durham
- Region: North East
- Country: England
- Sovereign state: United Kingdom
- Post town: DURHAM
- Postcode district: DH1
- Dialling code: 0191
- Police: Durham
- Fire: County Durham and Darlington
- Ambulance: North East
- UK Parliament: City of Durham

Gilesgate is a street and an eastern inner suburb of Durham in County Durham, England. The street was once the main eastern route into Durham City. It runs east from the end of Claypath on the edge of Durham City centre, steeply uphill to Gilesgate Moor where it splits into Sunderland Road and Sherburn Road. As a suburb, Gilesgate is only loosely defined. Administratively at a local scale, it is split between the Elvet and Gilesgate Ward of the City of Durham parish, the Gilesgate Moor Ward of Belmont and an unparished area between the two. The Gilesgate Moor and Old Durham Middle Layer Super Output Area, approximating most of what is called Gilesgate, had a population at the 2021 census of 6746.

== History ==
Gilesgate was originally the main street in a settlement associated with the Hospital of St Giles which was sited by the existing St Giles Church. Its Medieval name was Gillygate, and it developed as a "long deeply banked street" down from the moor and the church to the city, which by the eighteenth century was lined with houses.

During the 19th century, several collieries were built in and around Gilesgate and Gilesgate Moor. To the eastern end of Gilesgate and the west end of the Moor, a mining settlement called New Durham was built; this name is now largely lost but some of the village remains. At its other western end nearer to the city centre Gilesgate train station was opened in 1844 as a terminus on a branch of the Newcastle and Darlington Junction Railway, but served passengers for only 13 years; it remained open as a goods station however until 1966.

Through the nineteenth century, housing extended further east along both Sunderland Road and Sherburn Road, connecting the mining villages of Gilesgate Moor with Gilesgate and blurring the borders between the two. Additional housing was constructed along the Sherburn Road in the 1930s, including the Sherburn Road Estate, built to house residents from the slums of Framwelgate. Following the Second World War, a further council housing estate was constructed north of the Sunderland Road with the streets taking the names of war leaders and local recipients of the Victoria Cross. After many of the collieries closed, the suburb became largely residential, though some industrial buildings were developed in the Dragonville area.

Gilesgate was divided in two by the construction of the A690 and the demolition of a number of houses, pubs and shops at the foot of Gilesgate Bank to construct a roundabout. The road used the old railway line to Gilesgate station to provide quick access to the A1 Motorway, with a new cutting to the city centre requiring significant demolition.

== Facilities ==
Gilesgate is now a suburb of Durham and has a wide range of shops such as a Tesco Extra and a number of pubs, including New Durham Club and the Queens Head.

The historic parish church of St Giles is a grade I listed building, with the Roman Catholic church of St Joseph located on Mill Lane. Durham City Baptist Church, nestled in Edge Court (established in 1949, built in 1959), provides a community-focussed hub that works with many churches and organisations in the area. Local primary schools include Gilesgate, Laurel Avenue, St Hilds (Church of England) and St Joseph's (Roman Catholic). Gilesgate also has two retail parks, Dragonville and Durham retail parks.

== See also ==
- Kepier Hospital
