= William Cumin =

12th-century Bishop of Durham-elect

- Bishop of Durham
- Appointed: c. 11 May 1141
- Quashed: c. 14 March 1143
- Predecessor: Geoffrey Rufus
- Successor: William of St. Barbara
- Other post: Archdeacon of Worcester

Personal details
- Died: c. 1159

William Cumin (or de Comyn or de Commines) (died c. 1159) was a bishop of Durham, and Justiciar of Scotland.

== Life ==
Several Cumins were clerks in the chanceries of King Henry I of England and King Henry II of England, as well as in the dioceses of Rouen and Bayeux. A John Cumin, who became Bishop of Dublin in 1182 may also have been a relative. William Cumin was Archdeacon of Worcester by March 1125 and the chancellor of King David I of Scotland before 1136. David was the uncle of the Empress Matilda. Cumin was educated by Geoffrey Rufus, who had been chancellor to King Henry I of England and Bishop of Durham. Cumin was captured at the Battle of the Standard in August 1138, but was set free at the instigation of the papal legate, Alberic of Ostia.

At the time of the death of Geoffrey Rufus, most of the diocese of Durham was under the control of King David. With the death of Geoffrey, David tried to gain control of the English diocese by installing his own candidate into Durham, this being his chancellor, Cumin. When David came south to meet with the Empress, he stopped in Durham, where he refused to allow the burial of the previous bishop until Cumin was allowed into the see. Cumin was intruded into the see of Durham about 11 May 1141, but was never consecrated. However, when the Empress was driven from London in June 1141, this deprived Cumin of some support. Cumin still had the support of one of Geoffrey's nephews and support in the cathedral chapter and castle. But he was opposed by Ranulf, the nephew of Bishop Ranulf Flambard, who was an archdeacon at Durham, and by the papal legate to England. Another supporter was William of Aumale, Earl of York, who attempted to marry one of his nieces to Cumin's nephew who held Northallerton in the North Riding of Yorkshire.

By 1142, David had withdrawn his support, and Cumin resorted to using a forged letter of support from the papacy in an attempt to get consecrated. Eventually Cumin was deprived of his benefices by Pope Innocent II about 14 March 1143 as well as being excommunicated. Around this time his soldiers were described as by Simeon of Durham as "incessantly making forages; whatever they could lay their hands on they plundered....wherever these men passed it became a wilderness. Their torments were of many and various kinds, difficult to describe and difficult to believe. Men were hung from the walls of their own howses....others...plunged into the bed of the river....everywhere throughout the town there were groanss and various kinds of deaths". At the same time, the pope ordered a new election held at York Minster which selected the Dean of York, William of St. Barbara. Cumin, however, still had the support of two of the local magnates, Henry the Earl of Northumbria and Alan the Earl of Richmond, and Cumin garrisoned the priory. In 1144, Cumin negotiated a settlement of the dispute, in which he relinquished his claims to Durham in exchange for lands to endow his nephew Richard. Cumin was imprisoned for a time, but eventually returned to the south of England where he had the support of Gilbert Foliot, then Abbot of Gloucester.

Theobald of Bec, Archbishop of Canterbury then took up Cumin's cause in about 1146, and Theobald lobbied the papacy for Cumin's absolution. Cumin was restored to some of his benefices by 1152, and was once more Archdeacon of Worcester by 1157. He died probably about 1158 or 1159.

Two of Cumin's nephews served as knights in Scotland. William is noted as a knight by the Durham chronicle, and Osbert served Henry, earl of Northumberland. Both died in the before 1144 during the conflicts in Durham. Another nephew, Richard Comyn, received the honour of Richmond as part of his uncle's settlement at Durham. Richard was the ancestor of the Comyn family of Scotland.

== See also ==
- Lawrence of Durham

== Citations ==
Catholic Church titles
Preceded by Geoffrey Rufus	Bishop of Durham intruded, never consecrated 1141–1143	Succeeded by William of St. Barbara
Political offices
Preceded by Edward of Aberdeen	Chancellor of Scotland; 1147–1150	Succeeded by Walter possibly Walter FitzAlan
