= William of St. Barbara =

12th-century Bishop of Durham

- Bishop of Durham
- Elected: 14 March 1143
- Installed: c. 18 October 1144
- Term ended: 13 November 1152
- Predecessor: William Cumin
- Successor: Hugh de Puiset
- Other post: Dean of York

Orders
- Consecration: 20 June 1143

Personal details
- Died: 13 November 1152
- Buried: Durham Cathedral in the chapter house
- Denomination: Catholic

William of St. Barbara or William of Ste Barbe (died 13 November 1152) was a medieval Bishop of Durham.

== Life ==
From William's name, it is presumed that he was a native of Sainte-Barbe-en-Auge in Calvados in Normandy (Neustria). He was a canon of York Minster in 1128. He was Dean of York by December 1138.

William was elected to the see of Durham on 14 March 1143 and consecrated on 20 June 1143. He was elected in opposition to William Cumin, who had been intruded into the see by King David I of Scotland in 1141. Cumin was never consecrated and by 1143 had been excommunicated by Pope Innocent II, who also ordered a new election to be held at York Minster. It was this election which selected William of St. Barbara. However, the new bishop was not able to enter Durham right away, and he was enthroned either on 18 October 1144 or shortly thereafter.

Troubles continued in Durham, and the bishop was unable to attend the Council of Rheims in 1148, which led to a suspension by the pope for nonattendance. William supported Henry Murdac in the disputed election to the archbishopric of York, and it was probably Murdac who arranged for the suspension to be lifted. William also supported the Cistercians and the Augustinians, which perturbed his cathedral chapter, which was made up of Benedictine monks. He died 13 November 1152. A grave identified as his was excavated in the 19th century in the chapter house of Durham Cathedral.

== Citations ==
Catholic Church titles
Preceded by William Cumin	Bishop of Durham; 1143–1152	Succeeded by Hugh de Puiset
