= List of LGBTQ politicians in the United Kingdom =

The following is a list of gay, lesbian, bisexual and/or transgender individuals who have been elected as members of the House of Commons of the United Kingdom, European Union, other devolved parliaments and assemblies of the United Kingdom, and also members of the non-elected House of Lords since the initial formation of the United Kingdom in 1707.

Following the 2024 general election, the UK parliament has the largest number of self-identified LGBT members of any national legislature worldwide at 78.

== United Kingdom ==
=== Government of the United Kingdom ===
==== Prime Ministers ====
| Party | Name | Start | End |
|---|---|---|---|
| Liberal | Archibald Primrose, 5th Earl of Rosebery | 1894 | 1895 |

==== Cabinet Ministers from the Commons ====
Cabinet as a collection of senior ministers was informally developed over centuries. Formal membership of cabinet were not firmly established until the 1800s. The significance of different offices also vary over time.

| Party | Name | Portfolio(s) | Start | End | Ref(s) |
|---|---|---|---|---|---|
| Independent | Fulke Greville | Chancellor of the Exchequer (Note: Whether Greville (later Lord Brooke) was a senior minister is subject to debate, as the post of Chancellor of the Exchequer was a functional position junior to the Lord High Treasurer at the time.) | 1614 | 1621 | |
| Tory | George Germain | Secretary of State for the Colonies | 1775 | 1782 | |
| Tory | George Germain | First Lord of Trade | 1775 | 1779 | |
| Liberal | Lewis Harcourt | First Commissioner of Works | 1907 (Note: Harcourt served as First Commissioner of Works from 1905 but was elevated to Cabinet in 1907.) | 1910 | |
| Liberal | Lewis Harcourt | Secretary of State for the Colonies | 1910 | 1915 | |
| Liberal | Lewis Harcourt | First Commissioner of Works | 1915 | 1916 | |
| Labour | Hugh Dalton | Minister of Economic Warfare (outer Cabinet) | 1940 | 1942 | |
| Labour | Hugh Dalton | President of the Board of Trade (outer Cabinet) | 1942 | 1945 | |
| Labour | Hugh Dalton | Chancellor of the Exchequer | 1945 | 1947 | |
| Labour | Hugh Dalton | Chancellor of the Duchy of Lancaster | 1948 | 1950 | |
| Labour | Hugh Dalton | Minister of Town and Country Planning (attending Cabinet) | 1950 | 1951 | |
| Labour | Hugh Dalton | Minister of Local Government and Planning (attending Cabinet) | 1951 | 1951 | |
| Conservative | Harry Crookshank | Postmaster General (outer Cabinet) | 1943 | 1945 | |
| Conservative | Harry Crookshank | Leader of the House of Commons | 1951 | 1955 | |
| Conservative | Harry Crookshank | Minister for Health | 1951 | 1952 | |
| Conservative | Harry Crookshank | Lord Privy Seal | 1952 | 1955 | |
| Labour | Hugh Gaitskell | Chancellor of the Exchequer | 1950 | 1951 | |
| Conservative | Derick Heathcoat-Amory | Minister of Agriculture, Fisheries and Food | 1954 | 1958 | |
| Conservative | Derick Heathcoat-Amory | Chancellor of the Exchequer | 1958 | 1960 | |
| Conservative | Alan Lennox-Boyd | Secretary of State for the Colonies | 1954 | 1959 | |
| Conservative | Selwyn Lloyd | Minister of Defence | 1955 | 1955 | |
| Conservative | Selwyn Lloyd | Secretary of State for Foreign Affairs | 1955 | 1960 | |
| Conservative | Selwyn Lloyd | Chancellor of the Exchequer | 1960 | 1962 | |
| Conservative | Selwyn Lloyd | Leader of the House of Commons | 1963 | 1964 | |
| Conservative | Selwyn Lloyd | Lord Privy Seal | 1963 | 1964 | |
| Labour | Richard Crossman | Minister of Housing and Local Government (attending Cabinet) | 1964 | 1966 | |
| Labour | Richard Crossman | Leader of the House of Commons | 1966 | 1968 | |
| Labour | Richard Crossman | Lord President of the Council | 1966 | 1968 | |
| Labour | Richard Crossman | Secretary of State for Social Services | 1968 | 1970 | |
| Labour | Anthony Crosland | Secretary of State for Education and Science | 1965 | 1967 | |
| Labour | Anthony Crosland | President of the Board of Trade | 1967 | 1969 | |
| Labour | Anthony Crosland | Secretary of State for Local Government and Regional Planning | 1969 | 1970 | |
| Labour | Anthony Crosland | Secretary of State for the Environment | 1974 | 1976 | |
| Labour | Anthony Crosland | Secretary of State for Foreign and Commonwealth Affairs | 1976 | 1977 | |
| Labour | Roy Jenkins | Secretary of State for the Home Department | 1965 | 1967 | |
| Labour | Roy Jenkins | Chancellor of the Exchequer | 1967 | 1970 | |
| Labour | Roy Jenkins | Secretary of State for the Home Department | 1974 | 1976 | |
| Labour | George Thomas | Secretary of State for Wales | 1968 | 1970 | |
| Conservative | Norman St John-Stevas | Leader of the House of Commons | 1979 | 1981 | |
| Conservative | Norman St John-Stevas | Chancellor of the Duchy of Lancaster | 1979 | 1981 | |
| Labour | Nick Brown | Government Chief Whip in the House of Commons (attending Cabinet); Parliamentary Secretary to the Treasury (attending Cabinet) | 1997 | 1998 | |
| Labour | Nick Brown | Minister of Agriculture, Fisheries and Food | 1998 | 2001 | |
| Labour | Nick Brown | Government Chief Whip in the House of Commons (attending Cabinet); Parliamentary Secretary to the Treasury (attending Cabinet) | 2008 | 2010 | |
| Labour | Ron Davies | Secretary of State for Wales | 1997 | 1998 | |
| Labour | Peter Mandelson | Minister without Portfolio | 1997 | 1998 | |
| Labour | Peter Mandelson | Secretary of State for Trade and Industry | 1998 | 1998 | |
| Labour | Peter Mandelson | President of the Board of Trade | 1998 | 1998 | |
| Labour | Peter Mandelson | Secretary of State for Northern Ireland | 1999 | 2001 | |
| Labour | Chris Smith | Secretary of State for National Heritage | 1997 | 1997 | |
| Labour | Chris Smith | Secretary of State for Culture, Media and Sport | 1997 | 2001 | |
| Labour | Shaun Woodward | Secretary of State for Northern Ireland | 2007 | 2010 | |
| Labour | Ben Bradshaw | Secretary of State for Culture, Media and Sport | 2009 | 2010 | |
| Liberal Democrats | David Laws | Chief Secretary to the Treasury | 2010 | 2010 | |
| Liberal Democrats | David Laws | Minister Assisting the Deputy Prime Minister (attending Cabinet) | 2012 | 2015 | |
| Liberal Democrats | David Laws | Minister of State for Schools (attending Cabinet) | 2012 | 2015 | |
| Conservative | Justine Greening | Secretary of State for Transport | 2011 | 2012 | |
| Conservative | Justine Greening | Secretary of State for International Development | 2012 | 2015 | |
| Conservative | Justine Greening | Secretary of State for Education | 2016 | 2018 | |
| Conservative | Justine Greening | Minister for Women and Equalities | 2016 | 2018 | |
| Conservative | David Mundell | Secretary of State for Scotland | 2015 | 2019 | |
| Labour | Peter Kyle | Secretary of State for Science, Innovation and Technology | 2024 | 2025 | |
| Labour | Peter Kyle | Secretary of State for Business and Trade | 2025 | 2026 | |
| Labour | Peter Kyle | President of the Board of Trade | 2025 | 2026 | |
| Labour Co-op | Steve Reed | Secretary of State for Environment, Food and Rural Affairs | 2024 | 2025 | |
| Labour Co-op | Steve Reed | Secretary of State for Housing, Communities and Local Government | 2025 | 2026 | |
| Labour | Wes Streeting | Secretary of State for Health and Social Care | 2024 | 2026 | |
| Labour | Wes Streeting | Secretary of State for Defence | 2026 | present | |
| Labour Co-op | James Murray | Chief Secretary to the Treasury (attending Cabinet) | 2025 | 2026 | |
| Labour Co-op | James Murray | Secretary of State for Health and Social Care | 2026 | 2026 | |
| Labour | Chris Bryant | Secretary of State for Northern Ireland | 2026 | present | |
| Labour | Angela Eagle | Secretary of State for Environment, Food and Rural Affairs | 2026 | present | |

==== Junior Ministers from the Commons ====
| Party | Name | First office | Start | Ref(s) |
|---|---|---|---|---|
| Independent | Fulke Greville | Treasurer of the Navy | 1598 | |
| Liberal | Lewis Harcourt | First Commissioner of Works | 1905 | |
| Conservative | Philip Sassoon | Under-Secretary of State for Air | 1924 | |
| Labour | Hugh Dalton | Under-Secretary of State for Foreign Affairs | 1929 | |
| Conservative | Harry Crookshank | Under-Secretary of State for the Home Department | 1934 | |
| National Liberal | Robert Bernays | Parliamentary Secretary to the Ministry of Health | 1937 | |
| Conservative | Anthony Muirhead | Under-Secretary of State for Air | 1937 | |
| Conservative | Robert Boothby | Parliamentary Secretary to the Ministry of Food | 1940 | |
| Labour | Harold Nicolson | Parliamentary Secretary to the Ministry of Information | 1940 | |
| Conservative | James Thomas | Lord Commissioner of the Treasury | 1940 | |
| Labour | Hugh Gaitskell | Minister of Fuel and Power | 1946 | |
| Conservative | Alan Lennox-Boyd | Minister of State for the Colonies | 1951 | |
| Conservative | Derick Heathcoat-Amory | Minister of Pensions | 1951 | |
| Conservative | Selwyn Lloyd | Minister of State for Foreign Affairs | 1951 | |
| Conservative | Ian Harvey | Parliamentary Secretary to the Minister of Supply | 1956 | |
| Conservative | Charles Fletcher-Cooke | Parliamentary Secretary to the Home Office | 1961 | |
| Conservative | Denzil Freeth | Parliamentary Secretary for Science | 1961 | |
| Labour | Anthony Crosland | Economic Secretary to the Treasury | 1964 | |
| Labour | Roy Jenkins | Minister of Aviation | 1964 | |
| Labour | Richard Crossman | Minister of Housing and Local Government | 1964 | |
| Labour | George Thomas | Minister of State for Commonwealth Affairs | 1967 | |
| Conservative | Norman St John-Stevas | Minister of State for the Arts | 1973 | |
| Conservative | Spencer Le Marchant | Comptroller of the Household | 1979 | |
| Conservative | Peter Morrison | Lord Commissioner of the Treasury | 1979 | |
| Conservative | Michael Brown | Assistant Government Whip | 1993 | |
| Conservative | John Bowis | Parliamentary Under-Secretary of State for Health and Social Security | 1993 | |
| Labour | Clive Betts | Lord Commissioner of the Treasury | 1998 | |
| Labour | Ben Bradshaw | Parliamentary Under-Secretary of State for Foreign and Commonwealth Affairs | 2001 | |
| Labour | Angela Eagle | Parliamentary Under-Secretary of State for the Home Office | 2001 | |
| Labour | Stephen Twigg | Deputy Leader of the House of Commons | 2001 | |
| Labour | Ivor Caplin | Parliamentary Under-Secretary of State for Defence | 2003 | |
| Labour | David Cairns | Minister of State for Scotland | 2005 | |
| Labour | Shaun Woodward | Parliamentary Under-Secretary of State for the Northern Ireland Office | 2005 | |
| Labour | Chris Bryant | Deputy Leader of the House of Commons | 2008 | |
| Conservative | Greg Barker | Minister of State for Climate Change | 2010 | |
| Conservative | Crispin Blunt | Parliamentary Under-Secretary of State for Prisons and Youth Justice | 2010 | |
| Conservative | Alan Duncan | Minister of State for International Development | 2010 | |
| Conservative | Michael Fabricant | Lord Commissioner of the Treasury | 2010 | |
| Conservative | Nick Gibb | Minister of State for School Standards | 2010 | |
| Conservative | Justine Greening | Economic Secretary to the Treasury | 2010 | |
| Conservative | Nick Herbert | Minister of State for Policing and Criminal Justice | 2010 | |
| Conservative | David Mundell | Parliamentary Under-Secretary of State for Scotland | 2010 | |
| Conservative | Nick Boles | Parliamentary Under-Secretary of State for Decentralisation | 2012 | |
| Liberal Democrats | Simon Hughes | Minister of State for Justice and Civil Liberties | 2013 | |
| Liberal Democrats | Stephen Williams | Parliamentary Under Secretary of State for Communities and Local Government | 2013 | |
| Conservative | Margot James | Parliamentary Under-Secretary of State for Small Business, Consumers and Corporate Responsibility | 2016 | |
| Conservative | Christopher Pincher | Comptroller of the Household | 2017 | |
| Conservative | Stuart Andrew | Parliamentary Under-Secretary of State for Wales | 2018 | |
| Conservative | Mike Freer | Lord Commissioner of the Treasury | 2018 | |
| Conservative | Conor Burns | Minister of State for Trade Policy | 2019 | |
| Conservative | Iain Stewart | Parliamentary Under-Secretary of State for Scotland | 2020 | |
| Conservative | Lee Rowley | Parliamentary Under-Secretary of State for Business and Industry | 2021 | |
| Conservative | Dehenna Davison | Parliamentary Under-Secretary of State for Levelling Up | 2022 | |
| Conservative | Jacob Young | Lord Commissioner of the Treasury | 2022 | |
| Conservative | Damien Moore | Assistant Government Whip | 2022 | |
| Conservative | Mark Fletcher | Assistant Government Whip | 2023 | |
| Conservative | Paul Holmes | Assistant Government Whip | 2024 | |
| Labour Co-op | Stephen Doughty | Minister of State for Europe, North America and Overseas Territories | 2024 | |
| Labour | Nia Griffith | Parliamentary Under-Secretary of State for Wales | 2024 | |
| Labour Co-op | Simon Lightwood | Parliamentary Under-Secretary of State for Local Transport | 2024 | |
| Labour | Stephen Morgan | Parliamentary Under-Secretary of State for Early Education | 2024 | |
| Labour Co-op | James Murray | Exchequer Secretary to the Treasury | 2024 | |
| Labour Co-op | Luke Pollard | Parliamentary Under-Secretary of State for the Armed Forces | 2024 | |
| Labour | Gerald Jones | Assistant Government Whip | 2024 | |
| Labour | Keir Mather | Assistant Government Whip | 2024 | |
| Labour | Martin McCluskey | Assistant Government Whip | 2024 | |
| Labour | Olivia Bailey | Parliamentary Under-Secretary of State for Early Education | 2025 | |
| Labour | Ashley Dalton | Parliamentary Under-Secretary of State for Public Health and Prevention | 2025 | |
| Labour | Josh MacAlister | Parliamentary Under-Secretary of State for Children and Families | 2025 | |
| Labour | Deirdre Costigan | Assistant Government Whip | 2025 | |
| Labour | Kirsty McNeill | Parliamentary Under-Secretary of State for Scotland | 2025 | |

=== House of Commons ===
==== Leaders of the Opposition ====
| Party | Name | Start | End |
|---|---|---|---|
| Labour | Hugh Gaitskell | 1955 | 1963 |

==== Speakers of the House of Commons ====
| Party | Name | Start | End | Ref(s) |
|---|---|---|---|---|
| Labour | George Thomas | 1976 | 1983 | |

==== Members of Parliament ====
| Party | Name | Constituency | Start | End | Reason | Ref(s) |
|---|---|---|---|---|---|---|
| Independent | Fulke Greville | Warwickshire | 1581 | 1621 | Resigned to join the House of Lords (as the Lord Brooke) | |
| Independent | Philip Sidney | Shrewsbury (1581–1584); Kent (1584–1586) | 1582 | 1586 | Killed in action | |
| Independent | Anthony Bacon | Wallingford | 1593 | 1598 | Retired | |
| Tory | Edward Hyde | Wiltshire (1685–1695); Christchurch (1695–1701) | 1685 | 1701 | Resigned to become Governor of New Jersey in British North America (later joined the House of Lords as The Earl of Clarendon) | |
| Whig | John Hervey | Bury St Edmunds | 1725 | 1733 | Resigned to join the House of Lords (as The Baron Hervey) | |
| Whig | Stephen Fox-Strangways | Shaftesbury | 1726 | 1741 | Resigned to join the House of Lords (as the Earl of Ilchester) | |
| Tory | George Germain | Dover (1741–1761); East Grinstead (1761) | 1741 | 1761 | | |
| Tory | George Germain | East Grinstead | 1767 | 1782 | Resigned to join the House of Lords (as the Viscount Sackville) | |
| Whig | Horace Walpole | Callington (1741–1754); Castle Rising (1754–1757); Kings Lynn (1757–1768) | 1741 | 1768 | Retired (later joined the House of Lords as The Earl of Orford) | |
| Tory | John Tylney | Malmesbury | 1761 | 1768 | Resigned | |
| Tory | Edward Onslow | Aldborough | 1780 | 1781 | Resigned | |
| Whig | William Beckford | Wells | 1784 | 1795 | Resigned | |
| Whig | William Beckford | Hindon | 1806 | 1820 | Retired | |
| Tory | Charles Price | City of London | 1802 | 1812 | Retired | |
| Tory | William Bankes | Truro | 1810 | 1812 | Retired | |
| Tory | William Bankes | Cambridge University | 1822 | 1826 | Defeated | |
| Tory | William Bankes | Marlborough (1829–1832); Dorset (1832–1835) | 1829 | 1835 | Retired | |
| Whig | Henry Bennet | Shrewsbury | 1811 | 1826 | Retired | |
| Tory | Richard Heber | Oxford University | 1821 | 1826 | Retired | |
| Whig | Robert King | County Cork | 1826 | 1832 | Defeated | |
| Tory | Henry Lygon | West Worcestershire | 1853 | 1863 | Resigned to join the House of Lords (as the Earl Beauchamp) | |
| Liberal | Arthur Clinton | Newark | 1865 | 1868 | Retired | |
| Liberal | Ronald Gower | Sutherland | 1867 | 1874 | Retired | |
| Conservative | James Agg-Gardner | Cheltenham | 1874 | 1880 | Defeated | |
| Conservative | James Agg-Gardner | Cheltenham | 1885 | 1895 | Retired | |
| Conservative | James Agg-Gardner | Cheltenham | 1900 | 1906 | Defeated | |
| Conservative | James Agg-Gardner | Cheltenham | 1911 | 1928 | Died | |
| Liberal | Reginald Brett | Penryn and Falmouth | 1880 | 1885 | Defeated (later joined the House of Lords as the Viscount Esher) | |
| Liberal | Cyril Flower | Luton | 1880 | 1892 | Retired (later joined the House of Lords as the Lord Battersea) | |
| Liberal | Lewis Harcourt | Rossendale | 1904 | 1917 | Resigned to join the House of Lords (as the Viscount Harcourt) | |
| Liberal | David Erskine | West Perthshire | 1906 | 1910 | Retired | |
| Labour | Victor Grayson | Colne Valley | 1907 | 1910 | Defeated | |
| Conservative | Philip Sassoon | Hythe | 1912 | 1939 | Died | |
| Conservative | Malcolm Bullock | Waterloo (1923–1950); Crosby (1950–1953) | 1923 | 1953 | Resigned | |
| Liberal | Arthur Hobhouse | Wells | 1923 | 1924 | Defeated | |
| Conservative | Victor Cazalet | Chippenham | 1924 | 1943 | Killed in action | |
| Conservative | Robert Boothby | Aberdeen and Kincardine East (1924–1950); Aberdeenshire Eastern (1950–1958) | 1924 | 1958 | Resigned to join the House of Lords (as the Baron Boothby) | |
| Conservative | Harry Crookshank | Gainsborough | 1924 | 1956 | Resigned to join the House of Lords (as the Viscount Crookshank) | |
| Labour | Hugh Dalton | Peckham | 1924 | 1931 | Defeated | |
| Labour | Hugh Dalton | Bishop Auckland | 1935 | 1959 | Retired (later joined the House of Lords as the Lord Dalton) | |
| Labour | Oliver Baldwin | Dudley | 1929 | 1931 | Defeated | |
| Labour | Oliver Baldwin | Paisley | 1945 | 1947 | Resigned to join the House of Lords (as the Earl Baldwin of Bewdley) | |
| Conservative | Anthony Muirhead | Bristol North | 1929 | 1939 | Killed in action | |
| National Liberal | Robert Bernays | Bristol North | 1931 | 1945 | Killed in action | |
| Conservative | Ian Horobin | Southwark Central | 1931 | 1935 | Defeated | |
| Conservative | Ian Horobin | Oldham East | 1951 | 1959 | Retired | |
| Conservative | Paul Latham | Scarborough and Whitby | 1931 | 1941 | Resigned | |
| Conservative | Alan Lennox-Boyd | Mid Bedfordshire | 1931 | 1960 | Resigned to join the House of Lords (as the Viscount Boyd of Merton) | |
| Conservative | James Thomas | Hereford | 1931 | 1955 | Resigned to join the House of Lords (as the Viscount Cilcennin) | |
| Conservative | Ronald Tree | Harborough | 1933 | 1945 | Defeated | |
| Conservative | Ronald Cartland | Birmingham King's Norton | 1935 | 1940 | Killed in action | |
| Conservative | Henry Channon | Southend (1935–1950); Southend West (1950–1958) | 1935 | 1958 | Died | |
| Conservative | John Macnamara | Chelmsford | 1935 | 1944 | Killed in action | |
| Labour | Harold Nicolson | Leicester West | 1935 | 1945 | Defeated | |
| Conservative | Victor Montagu | South Dorset | 1941 | 1962 | Resigned to join the House of Lords (as the Earl of Sandwich) | |
| Labour | Tom Driberg | Maldon | 1942 | 1955 | Defeated | |
| Labour | Tom Driberg | Barking | 1959 | 1974 (Feb) | Retired (later joined the House of Lords as the Lord Driberg) | |
| Labour | Richard Crossman | Coventry East | 1945 | 1974 | Died | |
| Labour | Hugh Gaitskell | Leeds South | 1945 | 1963 | Died | |
| Conservative | Derick Heathcoat-Amory | Tiverton | 1945 | 1960 | Resigned to join the House of Lords (as the Viscount Amory) | |
| Conservative | Selwyn Lloyd | Chelmsford | 1945 | 1976 | Resigned to join the House of Lords (as the Baron Selwyn-Lloyd) | |
| Labour | George Thomas | Cardiff West | 1945 | 1983 | Retired (later joined the House of Lords as the Viscount Tonypandy) | |
| Labour | William J. Field | Paddington North | 1946 | 1953 | Resigned | |
| Labour | Roy Jenkins | Southwark Central (1948–1950); Birmingham Stechford (1950–1977) | 1948 | 1977 | Resigned | |
| SDP | Roy Jenkins | Glasgow Hillhead | 1982 | 1987 | Defeated (later joined the House of Lords as Lord Jenkins of Hillfield) | |
| Labour | Anthony Crosland | South Gloucestershire | 1950 | 1955 | Defeated | |
| Labour | Anthony Crosland | Great Grimsby | 1959 | 1977 | Died | |
| Conservative | Ian Harvey | Harrow East | 1950 | 1959 | Resigned | |
| Conservative | Charles Fletcher-Cooke | Darwen | 1951 | 1983 | Retired | |
| Conservative | Denzil Freeth | Basingstoke | 1955 | 1964 | Retired | |
| Conservative | Humphry Berkeley | Lancaster | 1959 | 1966 | Defeated | |
| Liberal | Jeremy Thorpe | North Devon | 1959 | 1979 | Defeated | |
| Conservative | Norman St John-Stevas | Chelmsford | 1964 | 1987 | Retired (later joined the House of Lords as Lord St John of Fawsley) | |
| Conservative | Spencer Le Marchant | High Peak | 1970 | 1983 | Retired | |
| Labour | Maureen Colquhoun | Northampton North | 1974 (Feb) | 1979 | Defeated | |
| Conservative | Keith Hampson | Ripon (1974–1983); Leeds North West (1983–1997) | 1974 (Feb) | 1997 | Defeated | |
| Conservative | Peter Morrison | City of Chester | 1974 (Feb) | 1992 | Retired | |
| Conservative | Charles Irving | Cheltenham | 1974 (Oct) | 1992 | Retired | |
| Conservative | David Atkinson | Bournemouth East | 1977 | 2005 | Retired | |
| Labour | George Morton | Manchester Moss Side | 1978 | 1983 | Retired | |
| Conservative | Michael Brown | Brigg and Cleethorpes | 1979 | 1997 | Defeated | |
| Conservative | Matthew Parris | West Derbyshire | 1979 | 1986 | Resigned | |
| Conservative | Harvey Proctor | Billericay | 1979 | 1987 | Retired | |
| Labour | Allan Roberts | Bootle | 1979 | 1990 | Died | |
| Conservative | Martin Stevens | Fulham | 1979 | 1986 | Died | |
| Labour | Roger Thomas | Carmarthen | 1979 | 1987 | Retired | |
| Conservative | David Ashby | North West Leicestershire | 1983 | 1997 | Retired | |
| Labour | Nick Brown | Newcastle upon Tyne East | 1983 | 2023 | Resigned from Labour and became an independent | |
| Independent | Nick Brown | Newcastle upon Tyne East | 2023 | 2024 | Retired | |
| Labour | Ron Davies | Caerphilly | 1983 | 2001 | Retired | |
| Conservative | Jerry Hayes | Harlow | 1983 | 1997 | Defeated | |
| Conservative | Robert Hayward | Kingswood | 1983 | 1992 | Defeated (later joined the House of Lords as the Lord Hayward) | |
| Conservative | Michael Hirst | Strathkelvin and Bearsden | 1983 | 1987 | Defeated | |
| Liberal Democrats | Simon Hughes | Bermondsey and Old Southwark | 1983 | 2015 | Defeated | |
| Labour | Chris Smith | Islington South and Finsbury | 1983 | 2005 | Retired (later joined the House of Lords as Lord Smith of Finsbury) | |
| Conservative | Alan Amos | Hexham | 1987 | 1992 | Retired | |
| Conservative | John Bowis | Battersea | 1987 | 1997 | Defeated | |
| Labour | Clive Betts | Sheffield South East | 1992 | present | Serving | |
| Conservative | Alan Duncan | Rutland and Melton | 1992 | 2019 | Retired | |
| Labour | Angela Eagle | Wallasey | 1992 | present | Serving | |
| Conservative | Nigel Evans | Ribble Valley | 1992 | 2024 | Defeated | |
| Conservative | Michael Fabricant | Lichfield | 1992 | 2024 | Defeated | |
| Labour | Peter Mandelson | Hartlepool | 1992 | 2004 | Resigned to become European Commissioner for Trade (later joined the House of Lords as Lord Mandelson) | |
| Conservative | Crispin Blunt | Reigate | 1997 | 2023 | Suspended from the Conservatives, became an independent | |
| Independent | Crispin Blunt | Reigate | 2023 | 2024 | Retired | |
| Labour | David Borrow | South Ribble | 1997 | 2010 | Defeated | |
| Labour | Ben Bradshaw | Exeter | 1997 | 2024 | Retired | |
| Labour | Ivor Caplin | Hove | 1997 | 2005 | Retired | |
| Conservative | Nick Gibb | Bognor Regis and Littlehampton | 1997 | 2024 | Retired | |
| Labour | Gordon Marsden | Blackpool South | 1997 | 2019 | Defeated | |
| Liberal Democrats | Mark Oaten | Winchester | 1997 | 2010 | Retired | |
| Labour | Stephen Twigg | Enfield Southgate | 1997 | 2005 | Defeated | |
| Labour | Stephen Twigg | Liverpool West Derby | 2010 | 2019 | Retired | |
| Conservative | Shaun Woodward | Witney | 1997 | 2001 | Resigned from the Conservative Party, joined the Labour Party | |
| Labour | Shaun Woodward | St Helens South and Whiston | 2001 | 2015 | Retired | |
| Conservative | Greg Barker | Bexhill and Battle | 2001 | 2015 | Retired (later joined the House of Lords as Lord Barker of Battle) | |
| Labour | Chris Bryant | Rhondda and Ogmore | 2001 | present | Serving | |
| Labour | David Cairns | Inverclyde | 2001 | 2011 | Died | |
| Liberal Democrats | David Laws | Yeovil | 2001 | 2015 | Defeated | |
| Plaid Cymru | Adam Price | Carmarthen East and Dinefwr | 2001 | 2010 | Retired | |
| Labour | Nia Griffith | Llanelli | 2005 | present | Serving | |
| Conservative | Justine Greening | Putney | 2005 | 2019 | Stripped of Conservative whip, became an independent | |
| Independent | Justine Greening | Putney | 2019 | 2019 | Retired | |
| Conservative | Nick Herbert | Arundel and South Downs | 2005 | 2019 | Retired (later joined the House of Lords as Lord Herbert) | |
| Conservative | Daniel Kawczynski | Shrewsbury and Atcham | 2005 | 2024 | Defeated | |
| Conservative | David Mundell | Dumfriesshire, Clydesdale and Tweeddale | 2005 | present | Serving | |
| Liberal Democrats | Stephen Williams | Bristol West | 2005 | 2015 | Defeated | |
| Conservative | Stuart Andrew | Pudsey | 2010 | 2024 | Changed constituency | |
| Conservative | Stuart Andrew | Daventry | 2024 | present | Serving | |
| Conservative | Nick Boles | Grantham and Stamford | 2010 | 2019 | Resigned from the Conservative Party, became an independent Conservative | |
| Ind. Progressive Conservative | Nick Boles | Grantham and Stamford | 2019 | 2019 | Retired | |
| Conservative | Conor Burns | Bournemouth West | 2010 | 2024 | Defeated | |
| Conservative | Mike Freer | Finchley and Golders Green | 2010 | 2024 | Retired | |
| Liberal Democrats | Steve Gilbert | St Austell and Newquay | 2010 | 2015 | Defeated | |
| Conservative | Margot James | Stourbridge | 2010 | 2019 | Retired | |
| Conservative | Mark Menzies | Fylde | 2010 | 2024 | Suspended from the Conservatives, became an independent | |
| Independent | Mark Menzies | Fylde | 2024 | 2024 | Retired | |
| Conservative | Eric Ollerenshaw | Lancaster and Fleetwood | 2010 | 2015 | Defeated | |
| Conservative | Christopher Pincher | Tamworth | 2010 | 2023 | Resigned | |
| Conservative | Iain Stewart | Milton Keynes South | 2010 | 2024 | Defeated | |
| Labour Co-op | Stephen Doughty | Cardiff South and Penarth | 2012 | present | Serving | |
| Labour Co-op | Steve Reed | Streatham and Croydon North | 2012 | present | Serving | |
| SNP | Hannah Bardell | Livingston | 2015 | 2024 | Defeated | |
| SNP | Mhairi Black | Paisley and Renfrewshire South | 2015 | 2024 | Retired | |
| SNP | Kirsty Blackman | Aberdeen North | 2015 | present | Serving | |
| SNP | Joanna Cherry | Edinburgh South West | 2015 | 2024 | Defeated | |
| SNP | Angela Crawley | Lanark and Hamilton East | 2015 | 2024 | Retired | |
| SNP | Martin Docherty | West Dunbartonshire | 2015 | 2024 | Defeated | |
| SNP | Patrick Grady | Glasgow North | 2015 | 2022 | Resigned from the SNP, became an independent. | |
| Independent | Patrick Grady | Glasgow North | 2022 | 2022 | Whip restored | |
| SNP | Patrick Grady | Glasgow North | 2022 | 2024 | Retired | |
| Conservative | Ben Howlett | Bath | 2015 | 2017 | Defeated | |
| Labour | Gerald Jones | Merthyr Tydfil and Aberdare | 2015 | present | Serving | |
| Labour | Peter Kyle | Hove and Portslade | 2015 | present | Serving | |
| SNP | Stewart McDonald | Glasgow South | 2015 | 2024 | Defeated | |
| SNP | Stuart McDonald | Cumbernauld, Kilsyth and Kirkintilloch East | 2015 | 2024 | Defeated | |
| SNP | John Nicolson | East Dunbartonshire | 2015 | 2017 | Defeated | |
| SNP | John Nicolson | Ochil and South Perthshire | 2019 | 2024 | Defeated in Alloa and Grangemouth | |
| Labour | Cat Smith | Lancaster and Fleetwood | 2015 | 2024 | Changed constituency | |
| Labour | Cat Smith | Lancaster and Wyre | 2024 | present | Serving | |
| Labour | Wes Streeting | Ilford North | 2015 | present | Serving | |
| Conservative | William Wragg | Hazel Grove | 2015 | 2024 | Resigned from the Conservatives, became an independent | |
| Independent | William Wragg | Hazel Grove | 2024 | 2024 | Retired | |
| Labour | Dan Carden | Liverpool Walton | 2017 | present | Serving | |
| Labour Co-op | Gerard Killen | Rutherglen and Hamilton West | 2017 | 2019 | Defeated | |
| Labour | Sandy Martin | Ipswich | 2017 | 2019 | Defeated | |
| Conservative | Damien Moore | Southport | 2017 | 2024 | Defeated | |
| Liberal Democrats | Layla Moran | Oxford West and Abingdon | 2017 | present | Serving | |
| Labour | Stephen Morgan | Portsmouth South | 2017 | present | Serving | |
| Labour Co-op | Luke Pollard | Plymouth Sutton and Devonport | 2017 | present | Serving | |
| Conservative | Lee Rowley | North East Derbyshire | 2017 | 2024 | Defeated | |
| Labour Co-op | Lloyd Russell-Moyle | Brighton Kemptown | 2017 | 2024 | Blocked from standing at the 2024 General Election following a complaint about his behaviour. | |
| Conservative | Ross Thomson | Aberdeen South | 2017 | 2019 | Retired | |
| Conservative | Imran Ahmad Khan | Wakefield | 2019 | 2021 | Suspended and later expelled from the Conservatives, became an independent | |
| Independent | Imran Ahmad Khan | Wakefield | 2021 | 2022 | Resigned | |
| Conservative | Scott Benton | Blackpool South | 2019 | 2023 | Suspended from the Conservatives, became an independent | |
| Independent | Scott Benton | Blackpool South | 2023 | 2024 | Resigned | |
| Labour | Olivia Blake | Sheffield Hallam | 2019 | present | Serving | |
| Conservative | Chris Clarkson | Heywood and Middleton | 2019 | 2024 | Defeated | |
| Conservative | Elliot Colburn | Carshalton and Wallington | 2019 | 2024 | Defeated | |
| Conservative | Dehenna Davison | Bishop Auckland | 2019 | 2024 | Retired | |
| Conservative | Mark Fletcher | Bolsover | 2019 | 2024 | Defeated | |
| Conservative | Peter Gibson | Darlington | 2019 | 2024 | Defeated | |
| SNP | Neale Hanvey | Kirkcaldy and Cowdenbeath | 2019 | 2021 | Resigned from the SNP, joined Alba Party | |
| Alba | Neale Hanvey | Kirkcaldy and Cowdenbeath | 2021 | 2024 | Defeated | |
| Conservative | Antony Higginbotham | Burnley | 2019 | 2024 | Defeated | |
| Conservative | Paul Holmes | Eastleigh | 2019 | 2024 | Changed constituency | |
| Conservative | Paul Holmes | Hamble Valley | 2024 | present | Serving | |
| Conservative | Kieran Mullan | Crewe and Nantwich | 2019 | 2024 | Changed constituency | |
| Conservative | Kieran Mullan | Bexhill and Battle | 2024 | present | Serving | |
| Labour Co-op | James Murray | Ealing North | 2019 | present | Serving | |
| Labour | Charlotte Nichols | Warrington North | 2019 | present | Serving | |
| Labour | Kate Osborne | Jarrow and Gateshead East | 2019 | present | Serving | |
| Conservative | Rob Roberts | Delyn | 2019 | 2021 | Suspended from the Conservatives, became an independent | |
| Independent | Rob Roberts | Delyn | 2021 | 2024 | Defeated | |
| Conservative | Gary Sambrook | Birmingham Northfield | 2019 | 2024 | Defeated | |
| SNP | Alyn Smith | Stirling | 2019 | 2024 | Defeated | |
| Conservative | Katie Wallis | Bridgend | 2019 | 2024 | Retired | |
| Labour | Nadia Whittome | Nottingham East | 2019 | present | Serving | |
| Conservative | Jacob Young | Redcar | 2019 | 2024 | Defeated | |
| Labour | Kim Leadbeater | Spen Valley | 2021 | present | Serving | |
| Labour Co-op | Simon Lightwood | Wakefield and Rothwell | 2022 | present | Serving | |
| Labour | Ashley Dalton | West Lancashire | 2023 | present | Serving | |
| Liberal Democrats | Sarah Dyke | Glastonbury and Somerton | 2023 | present | Serving | |
| Labour | Keir Mather | Selby | 2023 | present | Serving | |
| Labour | Damien Egan | Bristol North East | 2024 | present | Serving | |
| Labour | Dan Aldridge | Weston-super-Mare | 2024 | present | Serving | |
| Labour | James Asser | West Ham and Beckton | 2024 | present | Serving | |
| Liberal Democrats | Josh Babarinde | Eastbourne | 2024 | present | Serving | |
| Labour | Olivia Bailey | Reading West and Mid Berkshire | 2024 | present | Serving | |
| Labour | Antonia Bance | Tipton and Wednesbury | 2024 | present | Serving | |
| Labour | Alex Barros-Curtis | Cardiff West | 2024 | present | Serving | |
| Labour | Danny Beales | Uxbridge and South Ruislip | 2024 | present | Serving | |
| Labour | Polly Billington | East Thanet | 2024 | present | Serving | |
| Labour | David Burton-Sampson | Southend West and Leigh | 2024 | present | Serving | |
| Labour | Sam Carling | North West Cambridgeshire | 2024 | present | Serving | |
| Labour | Ben Coleman | Chelsea and Fulham | 2024 | present | Serving | |
| Labour | Jacob Collier | Burton and Uttoxeter | 2024 | present | Serving | |
| Labour | Deirdre Costigan | Ealing Southall | 2024 | present | Serving | |
| Liberal Democrats | Adam Dance | Yeovil | 2024 | present | Serving | |
| Green | Carla Denyer | Bristol Central | 2024 | present | Serving | |
| Labour | Alan Gemmell | Central Ayrshire | 2024 | present | Serving | |
| Labour | Tracy Gilbert | Edinburgh North and Leith | 2024 | present | Serving | |
| Liberal Democrats | Olly Glover | Didcot and Wantage | 2024 | present | Serving | |
| Liberal Democrats | Tom Gordon | Harrogate and Knaresborough | 2024 | present | Serving | |
| Labour | Lloyd Hatton | South Dorset | 2024 | present | Serving | |
| Labour | Tom Hayes | Bournemouth East | 2024 | present | Serving | |
| Labour | Terry Jermy | South West Norfolk | 2024 | present | Serving | |
| Labour | Lillian Jones | Kilmarnock and Loudoun | 2024 | present | Serving | |
| Labour | Josh MacAlister | Whitehaven and Workington | 2024 | present | Serving | |
| Liberal Democrats | Ben Maguire | North Cornwall | 2024 | present | Serving | |
| Labour | Martin McCluskey | Inverclyde and Renfrewshire West | 2024 | present | Serving | |
| Labour | Kevin McKenna | Sittingbourne and Sheppey | 2024 | present | Serving | |
| Labour | Kirsty McNeill | Midlothian | 2024 | present | Serving | |
| Labour | Luke Murphy | Basingstoke | 2024 | present | Serving | |
| Labour | Chris Murray | Edinburgh East and Musselburgh | 2024 | present | Serving | |
| Labour | Luke Myer | Middlesbrough South and East Cleveland | 2024 | present | Serving | |
| Labour | Josh Newbury | Cannock Chase | 2024 | present | Serving | |
| Labour | Samantha Niblett | South Derbyshire | 2024 | present | Serving | |
| Labour | Tris Osborne | Chatham and Aylesford | 2024 | present | Serving | |
| Labour Co-op | Andrew Pakes | Peterborough | 2024 | present | Serving | |
| Labour | Michael Payne | Gedling | 2024 | present | Serving | |
| Labour | Steve Race | Exeter | 2024 | present | Serving | |
| Liberal Democrats | Joshua Reynolds | Maidenhead | 2024 | present | Serving | |
| Labour | Martin Rhodes | Glasgow North | 2024 | present | Serving | |
| Labour | Tim Roca | Macclesfield | 2024 | present | Serving | |
| Labour | Tom Rutland | East Worthing and Shoreham | 2024 | present | Serving | |
| Labour Co-op | Oliver Ryan | Burnley | 2024 | present | Serving | |
| Conservative | Blake Stephenson | Mid Bedfordshire | 2024 | present | Serving | |
| Labour | Alan Strickland | Newton Aycliffe and Spennymoor | 2024 | present | Serving | |
| Labour | Peter Swallow | Bracknell | 2024 | present | Serving | |
| Labour | Rachel Taylor | North Warwickshire and Bedworth | 2024 | present | Serving | |
| Labour | Matt Turmaine | Watford | 2024 | present | Serving | |
| Labour | David Williams | Stoke-on-Trent North | 2024 | present | Serving | |

=== House of Lords ===
==== Leaders of the Opposition ====
| Party | Name | Start | End |
|---|---|---|---|
| Liberal | Archibald Primrose, 5th Earl of Rosebery | 1895 | 1896 |

==== Cabinet Ministers from the Lords ====
| Party | Name | Portfolio(s) | Start | End |
|---|---|---|---|---|
| Whig | John Hervey, 2nd Baron Hervey | Lord Privy Seal | 1740 | 1742 |
| Liberal | Archibald Primrose, 5th Earl of Rosebery | First Commissioner of Works | 1885 | 1885 |
| Liberal | Archibald Primrose, 5th Earl of Rosebery | Lord Privy Seal | 1885 | 1885 |
| Liberal | Archibald Primrose, 5th Earl of Rosebery | Secretary of State for Foreign Affairs | 1886 | 1886 |
| Liberal | Archibald Primrose, 5th Earl of Rosebery | Secretary of State for Foreign Affairs | 1892 | 1894 |
| Liberal | Archibald Primrose, 5th Earl of Rosebery | Lord President of the Council | 1894 | 1895 |
| Liberal | William Lygon, 7th Earl Beauchamp | Lord President of the Council | 1910 | 1910 |
| Liberal | William Lygon, 7th Earl Beauchamp | First Commissioner of Works | 1910 | 1914 |
| Liberal | William Lygon, 7th Earl Beauchamp | Lord President of the Council | 1914 | 1915 |
| Labour | Peter Mandelson, Baron Mandelson | Secretary of State for Business, Enterprise and Regulatory Reform | 2008 | 2009 |
| Labour | Peter Mandelson, Baron Mandelson | President of the Board of Trade | 2008 | 2010 |
| Labour | Peter Mandelson, Baron Mandelson | First Secretary of State | 2009 | 2010 |
| Labour | Peter Mandelson, Baron Mandelson | Secretary of State for Business, Innovation and Skills | 2009 | 2010 |
| Labour | Peter Mandelson, Baron Mandelson | Lord President of the Council | 2009 | 2010 |
| Labour | Andrew Adonis, Baron Adonis | Secretary of State for Transport | 2009 | 2010 |

==== Junior Ministers from the Lords ====
| Party | Name | First office | Start |
|---|---|---|---|
| Liberal | Archibald Primrose, 5th Earl of Rosebery | Under-Secretary of State for the Home Department | 1881 |
| Liberal | Cyril Flower, 1st Baron Battersea | Lord-in-waiting | 1886 |
| Conservative | Nicholas Eden, 2nd Earl of Avon | Lord-in-waiting | 1980 |
| Labour | Andrew Adonis, Baron Adonis | Parliamentary Under-Secretary of State for Schools and Learners | 2005 |
| Conservative | Ian Duncan, Baron Duncan of Springbank | Parliamentary Under-Secretary of State for Scotland | 2017 |
| Conservative | Deborah Stedman-Scott, Baroness Stedman-Scott | Baroness-in-Waiting | 2017 |
| Conservative | Stephen Parkinson, Baron Parkinson of Whitley Bay | Lord-in-Waiting | 2020 |
| Labour | Ray Collins, Baron Collins of Highbury | Lord-in-Waiting | 2024 |
| Labour | Spencer Livermore, Baron Livermore | Financial Secretary to the Treasury | 2024 |

==== Members of the House of Lords ====
| Party | Name | Start | End | Reason | Type | Ref(s) |
|---|---|---|---|---|---|---|
| Independent | Fulke Greville, 1st Baron Brooke | 1621 | 1628 | Died | Hereditary | |
| Tory | Edward Hyde, 3rd Earl of Clarendon | 1709 | 1723 | Died | Hereditary | |
| Whig | John Hervey, 2nd Baron Hervey | 1733 | 1743 | Died | Hereditary | |
| Whig | Stephen Fox-Strangways, 1st Earl of Ilchester | 1741 | 1776 | Died | Hereditary | |
| Tory | George Germain, 1st Viscount Sackville | 1782 | 1785 | Died | Hereditary | |
| Whig | William Courtenay, 9th Earl of Devon | 1788 | 1835 | Died | Hereditary | |
| Whig | Horace Walpole, 4th Earl of Orford | 1791 | 1797 | Died | Hereditary | |
| Whig | George Byron, 6th Baron Byron | 1798 | 1824 | Died | Hereditary | |
| Whig | Robert King, 4th Earl of Kingston | 1839 | 1867 | Died | Hereditary | |
| Tory | Henry Lygon, 5th Earl Beauchamp | 1863 | 1866 | Died | Hereditary | |
| Liberal | Archibald Primrose, 5th Earl of Rosebery | 1868 | 1929 | Died | Hereditary | |
| Liberal | William Lygon, 7th Earl Beauchamp | 1891 | 1938 | Died | Hereditary | |
| Liberal | Cyril Flower, 1st Baron Battersea | 1892 | 1907 | Died | Hereditary | |
| Liberal | Henry Paget, 5th Marquess of Anglesey | 1898 | 1905 | Died | Hereditary | |
| Liberal | Reginald Brett, 2nd Viscount Esher | 1899 | 1930 | Died | Hereditary | |
| Liberal | George Hamilton-Gordon, 2nd Baron Stanmore | 1912 | 1957 | Died | Hereditary | |
| Conservative | George Seymour, 7th Marquess of Hertford | 1912 | 1940 | Died | Hereditary | |
| Liberal | Lewis Harcourt, 1st Viscount Harcourt | 1917 | 1922 | Died | Hereditary | |
| Crossbench | Gerald Tyrwhitt-Wilson, 14th Baron Berners | 1918 | 1950 | Died | Hereditary | |
| Conservative | Napier Sturt, 3rd Baron Alington | 1919 | 1940 | Died | Hereditary | |
| Conservative | Urban Huttleston Broughton, 1st Baron Fairhaven | 1929 | 1966 | Died | Hereditary | |
| Conservative | Ian Maitland, 15th Earl of Lauderdale | 1931 | 1953 | Died | Hereditary | |
| Labour | Gavin Henderson, 2nd Baron Faringdon | 1934 | 1977 | Died | Hereditary | |
| Conservative | Evan Morgan, 2nd Viscount Tredegar | 1934 | 1949 | Died | Hereditary | |
| Liberal | Patrick Balfour, 3rd Baron Kinross | 1939 | 1976 | Died | Hereditary | |
| Liberal | John Maynard Keynes | 1942 | 1946 | Died | Hereditary | |
| Liberal | Basil Mackenzie, 2nd Baron Amulree | 1942 | 1983 | Died | Hereditary | |
| Conservative | Gerald Wellesley, 7th Duke of Wellington | 1943 | 1972 | Died | Hereditary | |
| Conservative | Sheridan Hamilton-Temple-Blackwood, 5th Marquess of Dufferin and Ava | 1945 | 1988 | Died | Hereditary | |
| Liberal | John Seely, 2nd Baron Mottistone | 1947 | 1963 | Died | Hereditary | |
| Conservative | Edward Douglas-Scott-Montagu, 3rd Baron Montagu of Beaulieu | 1947 | 2015 | Died | Hereditary | |
| Labour | Oliver Baldwin, 2nd Earl Baldwin of Bewdley | 1947 | 1958 | Died | Hereditary | |
| Conservative | James Thomas, 1st Viscount Cilcennin | 1955 | 1960 | Died | Hereditary | |
| Conservative | Harry Crookshank, 1st Viscount Crookshank | 1956 | 1961 | Died | Hereditary | |
| Conservative | Robin Maugham, 2nd Viscount Maugham | 1958 | 1981 | Died | Hereditary | |
| Conservative | Robert Boothby, Baron Boothby | 1958 | 1986 | Died | Life | |
| Conservative | Arthur Gore, 7th Earl of Arran | 1958 | 1958 | Died | Hereditary | |
| Labour | Hugh Dalton, Baron Dalton | 1960 | 1962 | Died | Life | |
| Conservative | Alan Lennox-Boyd, 1st Viscount Boyd of Merton | 1960 | 1983 | Died | Hereditary | |
| Conservative | Derick Heathcoat-Amory, 1st Viscount Amory | 1960 | 1981 | Died | Hereditary | |
| Liberal | Edward Sackville-West, 5th Baron Sackville | 1962 | 1965 | Died | Hereditary | |
| Conservative | Victor Montagu, 10th Earl of Sandwich | 1962 | 1964 | Resigned | Hereditary | |
| Conservative | Graham Eyres-Monsell, 2nd Viscount Monsell | 1969 | 1993 | Died | Hereditary | |
| Labour | Tom Driberg, Baron Bradwell | 1976 | 1976 | Died | Hereditary | |
| Crossbench | Selwyn Lloyd, Baron Selwyn-Lloyd | 1976 | 1978 | Died | Hereditary | |
| Crossbench | Benjamin Britten, Baron Britten | 1976 | 1976 | Died | Life | |
| Conservative | Nicholas Eden, 2nd Earl of Avon | 1977 | 1985 | Died | Hereditary | |
| Crossbench | George Thomas, 1st Viscount Tonypandy | 1983 | 1997 | Died | Hereditary | |
| Conservative | John Hervey, 7th Marquess of Bristol | 1985 | 1999 | Died | Hereditary | |
| Liberal Democrats | Roy Jenkins, Baron Jenkins of Hillhead | 1987 | 2003 | Died | Life | |
| Conservative | Norman St John-Stevas, Baron St John of Fawsley | 1987 | 2012 | Died | Life | |
| Labour | Jennifer Hilton, Baroness Hilton of Eggardon | 1991 | 2021 | Retired | Life | |
| Labour | Michael Montague, Baron Montague of Oxford | 1997 | 1999 | Died | Life | |
| Labour | Waheed Alli, Baron Alli | 1998 | present | Serving | Life | |
| Liberal Democrats | Elizabeth Barker, Baroness Barker | 1999 | present | Serving | Life | |
| Crossbench | John Browne, Baron Browne of Madingley | 2001 | present | Serving | Life | |
| Labour | Andrew Adonis, Baron Adonis | 2005 | present | Serving | Life | |
| Labour | Chris Smith, Baron Smith of Finsbury | 2005 | present | Serving | Life | |
| Labour | Peter Mandelson, Baron Mandelson | 2008 | 2026 | Resigned from Labour | Life | |
| Independent | Peter Mandelson, Baron Mandelson | 2026 | 2026 | Resigned before arrest and expulsion | Life | |
| Conservative | Guy Black, Baron Black of Brentwood | 2010 | present | Serving | Life | |
| Conservative | Deborah Stedman-Scott, Baroness Stedman-Scott | 2010 | present | Serving | Life | |
| Labour | Ray Collins, Baron Collins of Highbury | 2011 | present | Serving | Life | |
| Conservative | Michael Bishop, Baron Glendonbrook | 2011 | 2025 | Retired | Life | |
| Conservative | Stephen Sherbourne, Barone Sherbourne of Didsbury | 2013 | present | Serving | Life | |
| Liberal Democrats | Brian Paddick, Baron Paddick | 2013 | 2023 | Left Liberal Democrats due to position with the Metropolitan Police | Life | |
| Independent | Brian Paddick, Baron Paddick | 2023 | present | Serving | Life | |
| Labour | Charles Allen, Baron Allen of Kensington | 2013 | present | Serving | Life | |
| Liberal Democrats | Paul Scriven, Baron Scriven | 2014 | present | Serving | Life | |
| Labour | Michael Cashman, Baron Cashman | 2014 | present | Serving | Life | |
| Conservative | Robert Hayward, Baron Hayward | 2015 | present | Serving | Life | |
| Liberal Democrats | Jonny Oates, Baron Oates | 2015 | present | Serving | Life | |
| Conservative | Greg Barker, Baron Barker of Battle | 2015 | present | Serving | Life | |
| Labour | Spencer Livermore, Baron Livermore | 2015 | present | Serving | Life | |
| Conservative | Ian Duncan, Baron Duncan of Springbank | 2017 | present | Serving | Life | |
| Conservative | Stephen Parkinson, Baron Parkinson of Whitley Bay | 2019 | present | Serving | Life | |
| Crossbench | Ruth Hunt, Baroness Hunt of Bethnal Green | 2019 | present | Serving | Life | |
| Labour Co-op | Debbie Wilcox, Baroness Wilcox of Newport | 2019 | present | Serving | Life | |
| Conservative | Nick Herbert, Baron Herbert of South Downs | 2020 | present | Serving | Life | |
| Conservative | Daniel Moylan, Baron Moylan | 2020 | present | Serving | Life | |
| Crossbench | Terence Etherton, Baron Etherton | 2021 | 2025 | Died | Life | |
| Conservative | Peter Booth, Baron Booth | 2024 | present | Serving | Life | |
| Conservative | Roger Evans, Baron Evans of Guisborough | 2025 | present | Serving | Life | |
| Labour | Matthew Doyle, Baron Doyle | 2026 | 2026 | Suspended from Labour | Life | |
| Independent | Matthew Doyle, Baron Doyle | 2026 | present | Serving | Life | |
| Labour | Nick Forbes, Baron Forbes of Newcastle | 2026 | present | Serving | Life | |
| Labour | David Isaac, Baron Isaac | 2026 | present | Serving | Life | |
| Labour | Ann Limb, Baroness Limb | 2026 | present | Serving | Life | |

=== UK Party Leaders ===
| Party | Name | Start | End |
|---|---|---|---|
| Liberal | Archibald Primrose, 5th Earl of Rosebery | 1894 | 1896 |
| Labour | Hugh Gaitskell | 1955 | 1963 |
| Liberal | Jeremy Thorpe | 1967 | 1976 |
| SDP | Roy Jenkins | 1982 | 1983 |
| Green | Darren Johnson | 2001 | 2003 |
| Green | Zack Polanski | 2025 | present |

== European Union ==
=== European Commission ===
==== Members of the European Commission from the United Kingdom ====
| Party | Name | Portfolio(s) | Start | End |
|---|---|---|---|---|
| Labour | Roy Jenkins | President | 1977 | 1981 |
| Labour | Peter Mandelson | European Commissioner for Trade | 2004 | 2008 |

=== European Parliament ===
| Party | Name | Constituency | Start | End | Reason | Ref(s) |
|---|---|---|---|---|---|---|
| Conservative | Tom Spencer | Derbyshire | 1979 | 1984 | Defeated | |
| Conservative | Tom Spencer | Surrey | 1989 | 1999 | Retired | |
| Labour | Alan Donnelly | Tyne and Wear (1989–1999); North East England (1999) | 1989 | 1999 | Resigned | |
| Conservative | John Bowis | London | 1999 | 2009 | Retired | |
| Labour | Michael Cashman | West Midlands | 1999 | 2014 | Retired | |
| SNP | Alyn Smith | Scotland | 2004 | 2019 | Resigned to become member of Parliament for Stirling | |
| UKIP | Nikki Sinclaire | West Midlands | 2009 | 2010 | Resigned from UKIP | |
| Independent | Nikki Sinclaire | West Midlands | 2010 | 2012 | Created We Demand a Referendum Now | |
| We Demand a Referendum | Nikki Sinclaire | West Midlands | 2012 | 2014 | Defeated | |
| UKIP | David Coburn | Scotland | 2014 | 2019 | Joined the Brexit Party | |
| Brexit Party | David Coburn | Scotland | 2019 | 2019 | Retired | |
| Labour | Seb Dance | London | 2014 | 2020 | UK exited the EU | |
| Conservative | Ian Duncan | Scotland | 2014 | 2017 | Resigned to join the House of Lords | |
| Brexit Party | David Bull | North West England | 2019 | 2020 | UK exited the EU | |
| Brexit Party | Louis Stedman-Bryce | Scotland | 2019 | 2019 | Resigned from the Brexit Party | |
| Independent | Louis Stedman-Bryce | Scotland | 2019 | 2020 | UK exited the EU | |

=== European Party Leaders ===
| Party | Name | Start | End |
|---|---|---|---|
| Conservative | Tom Spencer | 1994 | 1997 |
| Labour | Alan Donnelly | 1998 | 1999 |

== Scotland ==
=== Scottish Government ===
==== Scottish Government Cabinet Ministers ====
| Party | Name | Portfolio(s) | Start | End | Ref(s) |
|---|---|---|---|---|---|
| SNP | Derek Mackay | Finance and the Constitution | 2016 | 2018 | |
| SNP | Derek Mackay | Finance, Economy and Fair Work | 2018 | 2020 | |
| SNP | Jeane Freeman | Health and Sport | 2018 | 2021 | |
| SNP | Jenny Gilruth | Education and Skills | 2023 | 2026 | |
| SNP | Jenny Gilruth | Deputy First Minister | 2026 | present | |
| SNP | Jenny Gilruth | Finance and Local Government | 2026 | present | |

==== Scottish Government Junior Ministers ====
| Party | Name | Portfolio(s) | Start | End | Ref(s) |
|---|---|---|---|---|---|
| Liberal Democrats | Iain Smith | Parliamentary Business Manager and Liberal Democrat Whip | 1999 | 1999 | |
| Liberal Democrats | Iain Smith | Parliament | 1999 | 2000 | |
| SNP | Derek Mackay | Local Government and Planning | 2011 | 2014 | |
| SNP | Derek Mackay | Transport and Islands | 2014 | 2016 | |
| SNP | Joe FitzPatrick | Parliamentary Business | 2012 | 2018 | |
| SNP | Joe FitzPatrick | Public Health, Sport and Wellbeing | 2018 | 2020 | |
| SNP | Joe FitzPatrick | Local Government Empowerment and Planning | 2023 | 2024 | |
| SNP | Marco Biagi | Local Government and Community Empowerment | 2014 | 2016 | |
| SNP | Jeane Freeman | Social Security | 2016 | 2018 | |
| SNP | Kevin Stewart | Local Government and Housing | 2016 | 2018 | |
| SNP | Kevin Stewart | Local Government, Housing and Planning | 2018 | 2021 | |
| SNP | Kevin Stewart | Mental Wellbeing and Social Care | 2021 | 2023 | |
| SNP | Kevin Stewart | Transport | 2023 | 2023 | |
| SNP | Jenny Gilruth | Europe and International Development | 2020 | 2022 | |
| SNP | Jenny Gilruth | Transport | 2022 | 2023 | |
| Green | Patrick Harvie (Note: Attended Cabinet twice a year as part of the Bute House Agreement.) | Zero Carbon Buildings, Active Travel and Tenants' Rights | 2021 | 2024 | |
| SNP | Emma Roddick | Equalities, Migration and Refugees | 2023 | 2024 | |
| SNP | Alyn Smith | Innovation, Technology and Tertiary Education | 2026 | present | |

=== Scottish Parliament ===
==== Members of the Scottish Parliament ====
| Party | Name | Constituency | Start | End | Reason | Ref(s) |
|---|---|---|---|---|---|---|
| Conservative | David Mundell | South of Scotland | 1999 | 2005 | Resigned to become MP for Dumfriesshire, Clydesdale and Tweeddale | |
| Liberal Democrats | Iain Smith | North East Fife | 1999 | 2011 | Defeated | |
| Liberal Democrats | Margaret Smith | Edinburgh West | 1999 | 2011 | Defeated | |
| Green | Patrick Harvie | Glasgow | 2003 | present | Serving | |
| SNP | Joe FitzPatrick | Dundee City West | 2007 | 2026 | Retired | |
| SNP | Marco Biagi | Edinburgh Central | 2011 | 2016 | Retired | |
| Conservative | Ruth Davidson | Glasgow | 2011 | 2016 | Retired | |
| Conservative | Ruth Davidson | Edinburgh Central | 2016 | 2021 | Retired | |
| Labour Co-op | Kezia Dugdale | Lothian | 2011 | 2019 | Resigned | |
| SNP | Jim Eadie | Edinburgh Southern | 2011 | 2016 | Defeated | |
| SNP | Derek Mackay | Renfrewshire North and West | 2011 | 2019 | Suspended from the SNP, became an independent | |
| Independent | Derek Mackay | Renfrewshire North and West | 2019 | 2021 | Retired | |
| SNP | Kevin Stewart | Aberdeen Central | 2011 | 2026 | Retired | |
| SNP | Jeane Freeman | Carrick, Cumnock and Doon Valley | 2016 | 2021 | Retired | |
| SNP | Jenny Gilruth | Mid Fife and Glenrothes | 2016 | present | Serving | |
| Conservative | Jamie Greene | West Scotland | 2016 | 2025 | Left Conservative Party, joined Liberal Democrats | |
| Liberal Democrats | Jamie Greene | West Scotland | 2025 | 2026 | Defeated | |
| Green | Ross Greer | West Scotland | 2016 | present | Serving | |
| Conservative | Ross Thomson | North East Scotland | 2016 | 2017 | Resigned to become MP for Aberdeen South | |
| Conservative | Annie Wells | Glasgow | 2016 | 2026 | Defeated | |
| Conservative | Craig Hoy | South Scotland; Dumfriesshire | 2021 | present | Serving | |
| Labour Co-op | Paul O'Kane | West Scotland | 2021 | 2026 | Defeated | |
| SNP | Emma Roddick | Highlands and Islands; Inverness and Nairn | 2021 | present | Serving | |
| Conservative | Tess White | North East Scotland | 2021 | 2026 | Retired | |
| Green | Holly Bruce | Glasgow Southside | 2026 | present | Serving | |
| Green | Iris Duane | Glasgow | 2026 | present | Serving | |
| Green | Kayleigh Kinross-O'Neill | Edinburgh and Lothians East | 2026 | present | Serving | |
| Green | Q Manivannan | Edinburgh and Lothians East | 2026 | present | Serving | |
| SNP | Alyn Smith | Stirling | 2026 | present | Serving | |

=== Scottish Party Leaders ===
| Party | Name | Start | End |
|---|---|---|---|
| Conservative | Ruth Davidson | 2011 | 2019 |
| Labour | Kezia Dugdale | 2015 | 2017 |
| Green | Patrick Harvie | 2019 | 2025 |
| Green | Ross Greer | 2025 | present |

== Wales ==
=== Welsh Government ===
==== Welsh Government Cabinet Ministers ====
| Party | Name | Portfolio(s) | Start | End | Ref(s) |
|---|---|---|---|---|---|
| Labour Co-op | Jeremy Miles | Counsel General | 2017 | 2021 | |
| Labour Co-op | Jeremy Miles | European Transition | 2018 | 2021 | |
| Labour Co-op | Jeremy Miles | Education and the Welsh Language | 2021 | 2024 | |
| Labour Co-op | Jeremy Miles | Economy, Energy and Welsh Language | 2024 | 2024 | |
| Labour Co-op | Jeremy Miles | Health and Social Care | 2024 | 2026 | |
| Plaid Cymru | Adam Price | Enterprise, Connectivity and Energy | 2026 | present | |

==== Welsh Government Junior Ministers ====
| Party | Name | Portfolio(s) | Start | End | Ref(s) |
|---|---|---|---|---|---|
| Labour | Hannah Blythyn | Environment | 2017 | 2018 | |
| Labour | Hannah Blythyn | Housing and Local Government | 2018 | 2021 | |
| Labour | Hannah Blythyn | Social Partnership | 2021 | 2024 | |

=== Senedd ===
==== Members of the Senedd ====
| Party | Name | Constituency | Start | End | Reason | Ref(s) |
|---|---|---|---|---|---|---|
| Labour | Ron Davies | Caerphilly | 1999 | 2003 | Retired | |
| Labour | Hannah Blythyn | Delyn | 2016 | 2026 | Defeated | |
| Labour Co-op | Jeremy Miles | Neath | 2016 | 2026 | Retired | |
| Plaid Cymru | Adam Price | Carmarthen East and Dinefwr | 2016 | present | Serving | |
| Plaid Cymru | Sara Crowley | Pontypridd Cynon Merthyr | 2026 | present | Serving | |

=== Welsh Party Leaders ===
| Party | Name | Start | End |
|---|---|---|---|
| Labour | Ron Davies | 1998 | 1998 |
| Plaid Cymru | Adam Price | 2018 | 2023 |

== Northern Ireland ==
=== Northern Ireland Executive ===
==== Northern Ireland Executive Cabinet ministers ====
| Party | Name | Portfolio(s) | Start | End | Ref(s) |
|---|---|---|---|---|---|
| Alliance | Andrew Muir | Agriculture, Environment and Rural Affairs | 2024 | present | |

=== Northern Ireland Assembly ===
==== Members of the Northern Ireland Assembly ====
| Party | Name | Constituency | Start | End | Reason | Ref(s) |
|---|---|---|---|---|---|---|
| Alliance | John Blair | South Antrim | 2018 | present | Serving | |
| Alliance | Andrew Muir | North Down | 2019 | present | Serving | |
| Alliance | Eóin Tennyson | Upper Bann | 2022 | present | Serving | |

=== Northern Irish Party Leaders ===
| Party | Name | Start | End |
|---|---|---|---|
| UUP | James Molyneaux | 1979 | 1995 |
| Green | Mal O'Hara | 2022 | present |

== Greater London Authority ==
=== Deputy Mayors of London ===
| Party | Name | Portfolio(s) | Start | End | Ref(s) |
|---|---|---|---|---|---|
| Conservative | Richard Barnes | Statutory Deputy; Communities, Cohesion and Regeneration | 2008 | 2012 | |
| Conservative | Simon Milton | Policy and Planning | 2008 | 2011 | |
| Conservative | Roger Evans | Statutory Deputy | 2015 | 2016 | |
| Labour Co-op | James Murray | Housing and Residential Development | 2016 | 2019 | |
| Labour Co-op | Tom Copley | Housing and Residential Development | 2020 | present | |
| Labour Co-op | Seb Dance | Transport | 2022 | present | |

=== London Assembly ===
==== Chairs of the London Assembly ====
| Party | Name | Constituency | Start | End |
|---|---|---|---|---|
| Conservative | Brian Coleman | Barnet and Camden | 2004 | 2005 |
| Conservative | Brian Coleman | Barnet and Camden | 2006 | 2007 |
| Green | Darren Johnson | Additional member | 2009 | 2010 |
| Green | Darren Johnson | Additional member | 2013 | 2014 |
| Conservative | Andrew Boff | Additional member | 2021 | 2022 |
| Conservative | Andrew Boff | Additional member | 2023 | 2024 |
| Conservative | Andrew Boff | Additional member | 2026 | 2026 |
| Independent | Andrew Boff | Additional member | 2026 | present |

==== London Assembly Members ====
| Party | Name | Constituency | Start | End | Reason | Ref(s) |
|---|---|---|---|---|---|---|
| Conservative | Richard Barnes | Ealing and Hillingdon | 2000 | 2012 | Defeated | |
| Conservative | Brian Coleman | Barnet and Camden | 2000 | 2012 | Defeated | |
| Conservative | Roger Evans | Havering and Redbridge | 2000 | 2016 | Retired | |
| Green | Darren Johnson | Additional member | 2000 | 2016 | Retired | |
| Conservative | Eric Ollerenshaw | Additional member | 2000 | 2004 | Defeated | |
| Conservative | Andrew Boff | Additional member | 2008 | 2026 | Left Conservatives | |
| Independent | Andrew Boff | Additional member | 2026 | present | Serving | |
| Labour Co-op | Tom Copley | Additional member | 2012 | 2020 | Resigned | |
| UKIP | Peter Whittle | Additional member | 2016 | 2018 | Resigned from UKIP | |
| Independent | Peter Whittle | Additional member | 2018 | 2021 | Retired | |
| Conservative | Emma Best | Additional member | 2021 | present | Serving | |
| Green | Zack Polanski | Additional member | 2021 | present | Serving | |
| Conservative | Nicholas Rogers | South West | 2021 | 2024 | Retired | |
| Green | Zoë Garbett | Additional member | 2024 | 2026 | Resigned when elected Mayor of Hackney | |
| Green | Benali Hamdache | Additional member | 2026 | present | Serving | |

== Combined authorities and county combined authorities ==
=== Directly elected combined authority mayors ===
| Party | Name | Constituency | Start | End | Reason | Ref(s) |
|---|---|---|---|---|---|---|
| Conservative | Andy Street | West Midlands | 2017 | 2024 | Defeated | |
| Labour | Paul Dennett | Greater Manchester (acting) | 2026 | 2026 | Serving | |
| Labour Co-op | Bev Craig | Greater Manchester | 2026 | present | Serving | |

== Local authorities ==
=== Directly elected local authority mayors ===
| Party | Name | Constituency | Start | End | Reason | Ref(s) |
|---|---|---|---|---|---|---|
| Mayor 4 Stoke | Mike Wolfe | Stoke-on-Trent | 2002 | 2005 | Defeated | |
| Labour | Mark Meredith | Stoke-on-Trent | 2005 | 2009 | Position abolished | |
| Labour | Paul Dennett | Salford | 2016 | present | Serving | |
| Labour Co-op | Philip Glanville | Hackney | 2016 | 2023 | Expelled from the Labour Party, became an independent | |
| Independent | Philip Glanville | Hackney | 2023 | 2023 | Resigned | |
| Labour Co-op | Damien Egan | Lewisham | 2018 | 2024 | Resigned to stand in the 2024 Kingswood by-election | |
| Green | Zoë Garbett | Hackney | 2026 | present | Serving | |

== Police and crime commissioners ==
=== Directly elected police and crime commissioners ===
| Party | Name | Constituency | Start | End | Reason | Ref(s) |
|---|---|---|---|---|---|---|
| Labour Co-op | Olly Martins | Bedfordshire | 2012 | 2016 | Defeated | |
| Conservative | David Munro | Surrey | 2016 | 2021 | Defeated | |
| Labour | Dan Price | Cheshire | 2024 | present | Serving | |

== See also ==
- List of the first LGBT holders of political offices in the United Kingdom
