= Social Democratic Party (UK, 1988–1990) election results =

UK political party election results

This article lists the election results of the 'continuing' Social Democratic Party (SDP), founded by David Owen following the merger of the Liberal Party and original Social Democratic Party, in UK elections.

== By-elections ==
=== 1987–1992 Parliament ===
By-election	Candidate	Votes	%
1988 Kensington	John Martin	1,190	5.0
1988 Epping Forest	Michael Pettman	4,077	12.2
1989 Pontypridd	Terry Thomas	1,199	3.1
1989 Richmond (Yorks)	Mike Potter	16,909	32.2
1989 Vale of Glamorgan	David Davies	1,098	2.3
1989 Glasgow Central	Peter Kerr	253	1.0
1990 Mid Staffordshire	Ian Wood	1,422	2.5
1990 Bootle	Jack Holmes	155	0.4
1990 Upper Bann	Alistair Dunn	154	0.4

== European Parliament elections ==
=== 1989 European election ===
Constituency	Candidate	Votes	%
Bedfordshire South	R. Muller	3,067	1.6
Birmingham East	J. C. Binns	5,424	3.0
Cleveland & Yorkshire North	R. I. Andrew	7,970	4.0
Cumbria & Lancashire North	J. Bates	4,206	2.1
Derbyshire	Mrs. A. M. Ayres	3,858	1.9
Devon	R. C. Edwards	7,806	3.3
Greater Manchester Central	S. M. Millson	2,769	1.6
Greater Manchester West	Mrs. B. Archer	4,526	2.3
Hertfordshire	Mrs. C. Treves-Brown	5,048	2.7
Humberside	S. W. Unwin	3,419	2.1
London Central	W. D. E. Mallinson	2,957	1.6
London South East	A. A. Kinch	10,196	4.9
London West	J. R. Rogers-Davies	2,877	1.3
Norfolk	S. D. Maxwell	4,934	2.3
South Wales	D. A. T. Thomas	3,153	1.6
Surrey West	B. M. Collignon	3,676	2.1

== European Parliament by-elections ==
Date	Constituency	Candidate	Votes	%
15 December 1988	Hampshire Central	Earl Attlee	5,952	7.7
