= List of the first openly LGBTQ holders of political offices in the United Kingdom =

The following is a list of the first openly lesbian, gay, bisexual and/or transgender individuals to serve in selected political offices in the United Kingdom.

== Party leaderships ==
- 2008, first out male leader of a political party in Scotland
  - Patrick Harvie, Scottish Greens, MSP 2003–present
- 2011, first out female leader of a political party in Scotland
  - Ruth Davidson, Scottish Conservatives, MSP 2011–2019
- 2018, first out male leader of a political party in Wales
  - Adam Price, Plaid Cymru, AM/MS 2016–present
- 2020, first black, bisexual leader of a political party in the United Kingdom
  - Mandu Reid, Women's Equality Party, since 2020

== UK Cabinet ==
- 1997, first male Cabinet minister to be out before being appointed
  - Chris Smith, Labour, MP 1983–2005
- 2016, first male Cabinet minister to come out in office
  - David Mundell, Conservative, MP 2005–present
- 2016, first female Cabinet minister to come out in office
  - Justine Greening, Conservative, MP 2005–2019

== British Parliament ==
=== House of Commons ===
- 1597, first known LGBTQ+ Member of Parliament of England
  - Anthony Bacon, independent, elected as MP for Wallingford in 1593
- 1976, first outed (female) MP
  - Maureen Colquhoun, Labour, MP 1974–1979
- 1984, first MP to come out in office
  - Chris Smith, Labour, MP 1983–2005
- May 1997, first MPs to be out before being elected
  - Stephen Twigg, Labour, MP 1997–2005, 2010–2019
  - Ben Bradshaw, Labour, MP 1997–2024
- September 1997, first female MP to come out in office
  - Angela Eagle, Labour, MP 1992–present
- June 2001, first out Plaid Cymru MP
  - Adam Price, Plaid Cymru, MP 2001–2010
- 2002, first Conservative MP to come out
  - Alan Duncan, Conservative, MP 1992–2019
- January 2005, first MP to come out as HIV positive
  - Chris Smith, Labour, MP 1983–2005
- May 2005, First out Liberal Democrat MP
  - Stephen Williams, Liberal Democrats, MP 2005–2015
- May 2005, first Conservative MP to be out before being elected
  - Nick Herbert, Conservative, MP 2005–2019
- January 2006, first MP to be outed as bisexual
  - Simon Hughes, Liberal Democrat, MP 1983–2015
- May 2006, first MP to enter into a civil partnership
  - David Borrow, Labour, MP 1997–2010
- 2008, first female MP to enter into a civil partnership
  - Angela Eagle, Labour, MP 1992–present
- 2010, first female MP to be out before being elected, and first out Conservative female MP
  - Margot James, Conservative, MP 2010–2019
- December 2010, first out Deputy Speaker
  - Nigel Evans, First Chairman of Ways and Means 2010–2013, Second Chairman of Ways and Means 2020–2024
- 2013, first MP to voluntarily come out as bisexual
  - Daniel Kawczynski, Conservative, MP 2005–2024
- 2015, first MP to be out as bisexual before being elected; first female MP to be out as bisexual
  - Cat Smith, Labour, MP 2015–present
- 2020, first MP to come out as pansexual
  - Layla Moran, Liberal Democrat, MP 2017–present
- 2021, first female Conservative MP to be openly bisexual
  - Dehenna Davison, Conservative, MP 2019–2024
- 2022, first MP to come out as transgender
  - Katie Wallis, Conservative, MP 2019–2024
- 2024, first bisexual party leader in Westminster
  - Carla Denyer, Greens, MP 2024–present

=== House of Lords ===
- First out peer
  - Lord Alli, Labour, raised 1998
- First out female peer
  - Deborah Stedman-Scott, Baroness Stedman-Scott, Conservative, raised 2010

== European Parliament ==
- January 1999, first out UK MEP
  - Tom Spencer, Conservative, MEP 1979–1984, 1989–1999
- June 1999, first UK MEP to be out before office
  - Michael Cashman, Labour, MEP 1999–2014
- 2013, first openly transgender UK MEP
  - Nikki Sinclaire, UK Independence Party (later independent), MEP 2009–2014
- 2019, first gay and black UK MEP
  - Louis Stedman-Bryce, Brexit Party (later independent), MEP 2019–2020

== Scottish Parliament ==
- 1999, first out MSP
  - Iain Smith, Scottish Liberal Democrats, MSP 1999–2011
- 2003, first out female MSP
  - Margaret Smith, Scottish Liberal Democrats, 1999–2011
- 2003, first out Scottish Green MSP
  - Patrick Harvie, Scottish Green Party, MSP 2003–present
- 2007, first out SNP MSP
  - Joe FitzPatrick, Scottish National Party, MSP 2007–present
- 2011, first out Scottish Conservative MSP
  - Ruth Davidson, Scottish Conservative Party, MSP 2011–present
- 2016, first out Scottish Labour MSP
  - Kezia Dugdale, Scottish Labour Party, MSP 2011–present
- 2026, first out non-binary MSP
  - Q Manivannan, Scottish Greens, MSP 2026–present
- 2026, first out transgender MSP
  - Iris Duane, Scottish Greens
  - Q Manivannan, Scottish Greens, MSP 2026–present

=== Scottish Government ===
- 1999, first out Scottish minister
  - Iain Smith, Scottish Liberal Democrats, Deputy Minister for Parliament
- 2016, first out Scottish Cabinet minister
  - Derek Mackay, Scottish National Party, Cabinet Secretary for Finance and the Constitution
- 2016, first out female minister
  - Jeane Freeman, Scottish National Party, Minister for Social Security

== Welsh Assembly / Senedd ==
- 1999, first out Welsh AM
  - Ron Davies, Labour, 1999–2003
- 2017, first out Welsh cabinet secretary to be appointed
  - Jeremy Miles, Labour, 2017–present
- 2017, first out minister to be appointed
  - Hannah Blythyn, Labour, 2017–present

== Northern Ireland Assembly ==
- 2018, first out MLA
  - John Blair, Alliance, 2018–present
- 2024, first out Executive minister to be appointed
  - Andrew Muir, Alliance, 2024–present

== Police and crime commissioner ==
Police and crime commissioners were introduced in 2012.

- 2012, first out PCC
  - Olly Martins, Labour, 2012–2016

== Directly elected mayors ==
The first directly elected mayors were elected in 2002.

- 2002, first out directly elected executive mayor
  - Mike Wolfe, independent, 2002–2005
- 2016, first out directly elected metropolitan mayor
  - Paul Dennett, Labour, 2016–present
- 2016, first out directly elected London borough mayor
  - Philip Glanville, Labour, 2016–2023

== Councillors and mayors ==
=== England ===
==== Bolton ====
- Horwich Town Council: 2013, first open lesbian and first person in a civil partnership as mayor: Christine A. Root (2013–2014)

==== Brighton and Hove ====
- 1999, first out committee chair and group leader: Paul Elgood (1999–2012)

==== Bristol ====
- 1997, first out trans councillor and first to transition while holding elected public office: Rosalind Mitchell

==== Cambridge ====
- 2007, first trans mayor: Jenny Bailey (2007–2008)

==== Durham ====
- 1972, first openly gay councillor in the UK and first known openly gay candidate for UK elected office: Sam Green}}</ref>-->

==== Hackney ====
- 2016, first openly gay directly elected mayor: Philip Glanville (2016–present)

==== Islington ====
- 1986, first out gay mayor: Robert Crossman (1986)

==== Liverpool ====
- 2013, first openly gay Lord Mayor: Gary Millar (Old Swan, 2013–2014)

==== Manchester ====
- 2016, first openly gay Lord Mayor: Carl Austin-Behan (2016–2017)

==== Salford ====
- 2016, first openly gay Mayor: Paul Dennett

==== Trafford ====
- 2016, first openly gay leader of the council: Sean Anstee (2014–2018)

==== Haslemere ====
- 2015, first openly gay deputy mayor: Sahran Abeysundara (elected 2015)
- 2016, first openly gay mayor: Sahran Abeysundara (elected 2016)

==== London ====
===== Greater London Authority =====
The Greater London Authority, along with the offices of Mayor of London (not to be confused with the ancient Lord Mayor) and Deputy Mayor, was established in 2000.

- 2000, first openly gay members of the London Assembly: Brian Coleman, Andrew Boff and Richard Barnes – Conservative and Darren Johnson – Green Party (elected 2000)
- 2013, first openly gay deputy mayor: Richard Barnes (appointed 2008)

===== Southwark =====
- First openly gay mayor: Jeff Hook:

===== Camden =====
- 2010, first openly gay Mayor and Mayoress: Jonathan Simpson and Amy Lamé

==== Croydon ====
- 2016, first openly gay Mayor: Wayne Trakas-Lawlor (2016–2017):

===== Richmond =====
- 2007, first openly gay mayor: Marc Cranfield-Adams (2007)

=== Wales ===
==== Aberystwyth ====
- First openly lesbian mayor, with her partner as mayoress: Jaci Taylor (2000–2001), Plaid Cymru

==== Milford Haven ====
- 2012, frst openly gay mayor of the town council and first mayor in a civil partnership: Guy Woodham (2012–2013)

==== Blaenau Gwent ====
- 2012, first openly bisexual chairman of the council: Julian Meek (2012–2013), Plaid Cymru

==== Bangor ====
- 2021, the world's first non-binary mayor and Wales' youngest ever mayor: Owen Hurcum (2021–2022), independent

== See also ==
- List of LGBT politicians in the United Kingdom
- List of non-binary political office-holders
- List of the first LGBT holders of political offices
