= Mayor of Stoke-on-Trent =

Elected office in the United Kingdom, 2002–2009

- Appointer: Electorate of Stoke-on-Trent
- Precursor: Council Leader
- Formation: 2002
- First holder: Mike Wolfe
- Final holder: Mark Meredith
- Abolished: 2009
- Succession: Council Leader

The Mayor of Stoke-on-Trent was an executive mayoralty that existed from 2002 to 2009, when the executive of Stoke-on-Trent City Council was a directly elected mayor. The authority was unique in being the only authority in England with an elected mayor and council manager. The first mayor was Mike Wolfe, a former manager of the Citizen's Advice Bureau in the city. He had stood as an independent, but was defeated by Mark Meredith representing the Labour Party in 2005. A referendum was held on 24 October 2008. Residents voted in favour of a return to the council leader and cabinet system. There was controversy when it was revealed three years later that plans to close a swimming pool in the city had been agreed privately by the former mayor.

== Referendum ==
=== 2002 ===
Mayor of Stoke-on-Trent referendum 2 May 2002
Choice	Votes	%
Elected Mayor	28,601	58.16
Cabinet System	20,578	41.84
Required majority		50
Total	49,179	100.00
Registered voters/turnout		27.8
Source: House of Commons Library

=== 2008 ===
Mayor of Stoke-on-Trent referendum 23 October 2008
Choice	Votes	%
Cabinet System	21,231	59.27
Elected Mayor	14,592	40.73
Required majority		50
Total	35,823	100.00
Registered voters/turnout		19.23
Source: This is Staffordshire

== 2002 ==
Stoke-on-Trent Mayoral Election 17 October 2002
Party	Candidate	1st round		2nd round			1st round votesTransfer votes, 2nd round
Party	Candidate	Total	Of round	Transfers	Total	Of round	1st round votesTransfer votes, 2nd round
Mayor 4 Stoke	Mike Wolfe	9,356	21.3%	3,337	12,693	50.6%	
Labour	George Stevenson	9,752	22.2%	2,627	12,379	49.4%	
BNP	Steven Batkin	8,213	18.7%				
Conservative	Roger Ibbs	4,417	10.0%				
Independent	Geoffery Snow	3,975	9.0%				
Liberal Democrats	Fred Morrow	1,826	5.5%				
Independent	Paul Breeze	1,349	3.1%				
Independent	Patricia Whitehouse	1,280	2.9%				
Independent	Graham Wilkes	1,157	2.6%				
Adrian Knapper Independent Party	Adrian Knapper	708	1.6%				
Independent	Harry Chesters	453	1.0%				
Mayor 4 Stoke win							

== 2005 ==
Stoke-on-Trent Mayoral Election, 5 May 2005
Party	Candidate	1st round		2nd round			1st round votesTransfer votes, 2nd round
Party	Candidate	Total	Of round	Transfers	Total	Of round	1st round votesTransfer votes, 2nd round
Labour	Mark Meredith	27,253	32.9%	9,708	36,961	61.5%	
Conservative	Roger Ibbs	16,211	19.5%	6,919	23,130	38.5%	
Supporting Green Shoots	Mike Wolfe	15,882	19.1%				
BNP	Steven Batkin	15,776	19.0%				
Independent	Gary Chevin	4,505	5.4%				
Independent	Justine Harvey	1,955	2.4%				
Independent	Gary Falconer	1,368	1.6%				
Labour gain from Mayor 4 Stoke							

== List of mayors ==
- Mike Wolfe (2002 to 2005)
- Mark Meredith (2005 to 2009)
