= St Margaret's Church, Durham =

Parish church in Crossgate

St Margaret's, Durham
- St Margaret's Church, Durham
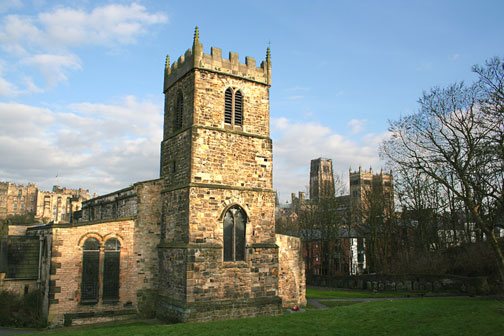
- St Margaret's Church with Durham Cathedral in the background

- Location within Durham, England
- 54.7758°N 1.5799°W
- OS grid reference: NZ 27121 42405
- Location: Crossgate, Durham, County Durham, DH1 4PR
- Country: England
- Denomination: Church of England
- Previous denomination: Roman Catholic Church
- Churchmanship: Liberal Catholic
- Website: St Margaret's Church

History
- Status: Active
- Dedication: St Margaret of Antioch

Architecture
- Functional status: Parish Church
- Heritage designation: Grade I listed
- Designated: 6 May 1952
- Years built: 12th century

Administration
- Diocese: Diocese of Durham
- Archdeaconry: Archdeaconry of Durham
- Deanery: Durham
- Parish: St. Margaret Durham

Clergy
- Rector: Fr Barnaby Huish

St Margaret's Church Durham is an active parish Church situated on Crossgate in the city of Durham in the North-East of England. The building is Grade I listed and substantial parts date from the 12th century; the compact yet spacious interior has a pleasing asymmetry, which reveals different stages in the building's development.

== Foundation and early history ==
St Margaret's was established in the 12th century as a Chapel of Ease in the Parish of St Oswald, to serve inhabitants of the Borough of Crossgate. Like St Oswald's, St Margaret's was under the jurisdiction of the Prior of Durham (whose successors, the Dean and Chapter, are to this day Patrons of the Living). There is evidence that, following the establishment of their own Chapelry, the people of Crossgate resented still having to attend the Parish Church at certain times, and still having to pay certain dues. One dispute in 1343 culminated in the Prior having the font removed from St Margaret's; only for it to be returned at the command of the Bishop (albeit with a warning which made it clear that the parishioners had no right to use it). It was not long afterwards, however, that residents of the Chapelry were granted the right to be married, churched and baptized in St Margaret's; and in 1431 the surrounding Church Garth was consecrated to allow the dead to be buried there.

== Architectural history ==
The earliest extant parts of the building are estimated to date from around AD 1150. At this time, the church probably consisted of the Nave, South Aisle and Chancel. A North Aisle was added towards the end of the twelfth century; the North Nave arcade is taller and more elaborate than its South Nave counterpart (though both are in the Norman style). The aforementioned font is also still in place, and it too is believed to date from the twelfth century. Two Norman windows survive from this period: one in the Chancel, one in the South Nave clerestory. In the time of the fourteenth-century Bishop de Bury, the South Aisle was remodelled, and new clerestory windows were inserted above the Nave. Further expansion took place in the fifteenth century, including the addition of a Lady Chapel to the south of the Chancel, and the building of the tower. Two of the church's three bells date from this period (the other is sixteenth-century). In the second half of the nineteenth century, the Church was restored internally and externally; the North Aisle (as visible from the street) was largely rebuilt, and a full set of stained glass windows (judged to be of good quality for their time) were added.

The Church contains a large number of memorials, mostly marble plaques dating from the 18th and 19th centuries. Prominent on the floor of the Nave is a large memorial ledger slab which marks the burial place of Sir John Duck, Bt, a seventeenth-century mayor of Durham known as 'Durham's Dick Whittington' because of his poor origins.

== Twentieth-century features ==
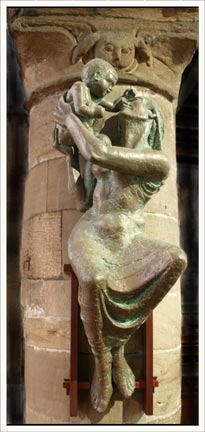
Madonna and Child

The fine organ dates from 1917 and is by Harrison & Harrison (whose factory was, until recently, within the Parish). Arthur Harrison, who was churchwarden of St Margaret's at the time, donated the Choir division. The eagle lectern dates from 1909, and was given in memory of members of the Shafto family killed in the Boer War. Of more recent provenance is a much-admired statue of the Madonna and Child 'on the theme of Universal Motherhood' which was made by the late Brian Scraton, a local art teacher, and installed in 1993.

== Church life and worship in the last 50 years ==
Following the arrival of Stephen Davis as Rector in the 1960s, St Margaret's experienced a period of Charismatic Renewal (of a distinctively catholic and sacramental flavour) and in the 1970s and 80s was a leading centre of charismatic worship in the north of England. This particular period in its history came to an end with the retirement of Fr Davis in 1988; under subsequent Rectors different emphases have been in evidence: from charismatic to catholic to contemplative, all of which aspects have contributed to its present character.

An historical guide to the Church was written by Bertram Colgrave, renowned Anglo-Saxonist and former worshipper at St Margaret's; it is still in print, having been thoroughly revised in 2008.

== Institutions and organisations associated with St Margaret's ==
St Margaret's Church of England (Controlled) Primary School is set within extensive grounds on Archery Rise. The school celebrated its 150th anniversary in 2011, having moved to its current site in the mid-1970s.

The old school buildings in Margery Lane are leased by the Church to St Margaret's Centre, which encourages people with mental health problems to develop new skills. St Margaret's Centre was founded in 1991; members of the Church continue to serve as trustees.

== St John's, Neville's Cross ==
St John's Church stands opposite the ancient pilgrims' waymark known as Neville's Cross. It was built as a Mission Church by St Margaret's, towards the end of the 19th century, on a green field site in anticipation of the residential development of the area which soon followed. The building was dedicated on 8 April 1896 by Bishop Sandford. It was designed with future expansion in mind: both the east wall and the west wall incorporated tall arches, designed to be knocked though. This took place at the east end in 1908, when the chancel was added in memory of G. S. Ellam, a former Curate killed in a motorcycle accident (after whom a nearby street is also named). Development at the west end had to wait until 1994, when a Church Centre was added in time for the Church's centenary; it was opened by Bishop Michael Turnbull.

St John's had the status of a Chapel-of-Ease of St Margaret's throughout the 20th century, with the Curate of St Margaret's in later decades serving as de facto priests-in-charge. In the year 2000 St John's gained full independence as a parish in its own right, and the building was finally consecrated. It is known as "The Church at the Cross-roads".

Since 2007 an annual Eco-Festival has been held in the Church grounds: a large-scale free community event which reflects the Church's concern for issues of global justice and ecology.
