= Sam Green (councillor) =

Psychiatric nurse and Liberal politician

Councillor Sam Green
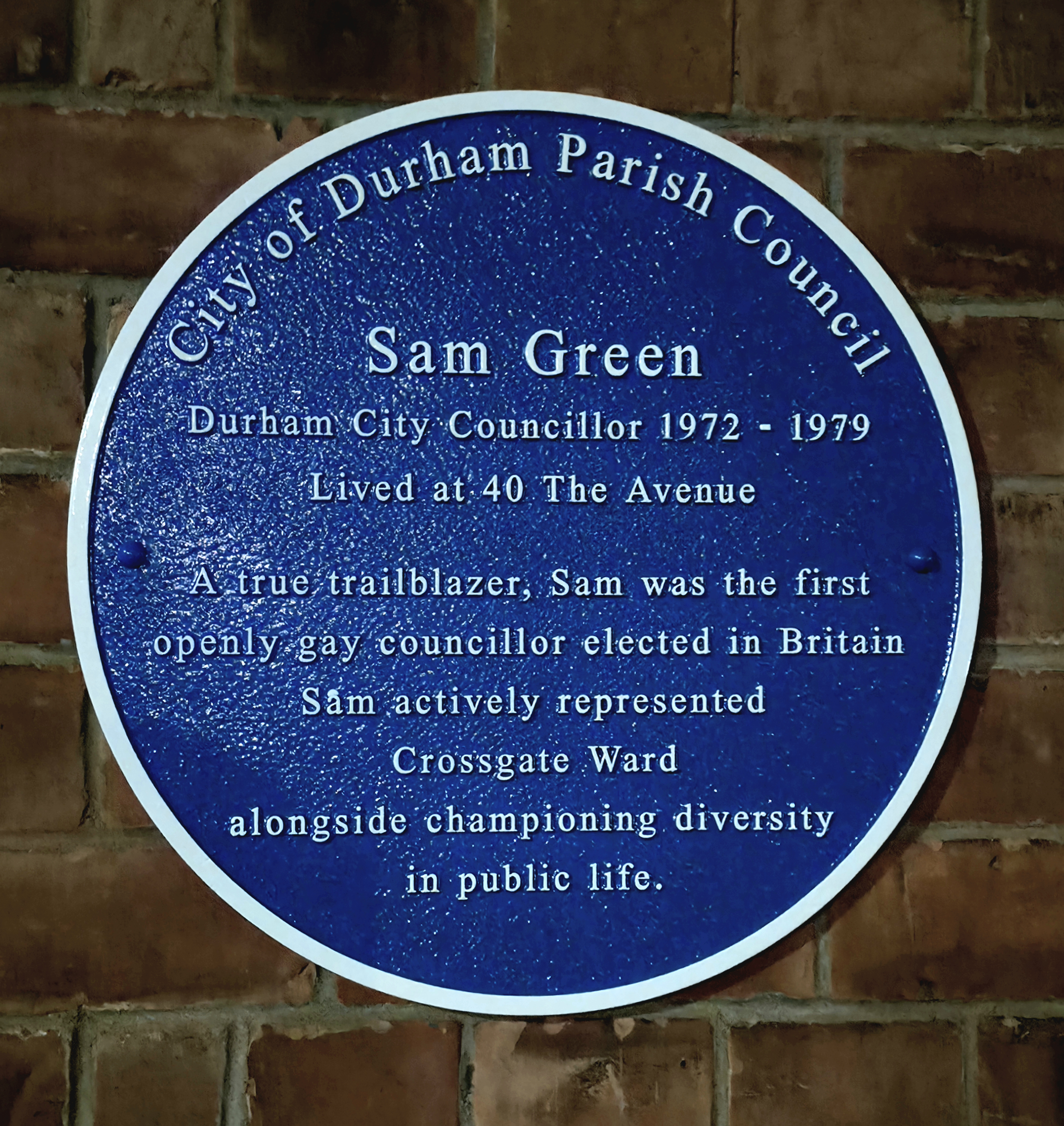
- Blue plaque at Green's former home in Durham

Member of Durham City Council for Crossgate
- In office 1972–1979

Personal details
- Born: Samuel Burton Green; 29 January 1941 Neasham, County Durham, England
- Died: 9 August 1999 (aged 58) London, England
- Party: Liberal

Samuel Burton Green (29 January 1941 – 9 August 1999) was an openly gay psychiatric nurse and Liberal politician who was elected as a member of Durham City Council in 1972, making him the first openly-gay politician in the UK and first known openly gay candidate in an election in Britain.

== Political career ==
Green was aged 31 at the time of his election to the Crossgate seat, and had stood for election to the council twice before. During the campaign he openly identified himself as gay and as a member of the Gay Liberation Front, and in an interview with Gay News he reported that his sexuality had been extensively covered in the press and had attracted negative comments from opponents. He was elected to the seat, ousting an 18-year incumbent councillor.

As one of his actions as a councillor, he asked for Gay News to be stocked in the city's libraries.

Green retained his seat in the 1973 and 1976 local elections, but did not stand in the 1979 elections (when the seat was incorporated into a larger Crossgate and Framwelgate ward), and moved away from Durham around 1980.

== World in Action documentary ==
In 1973, as part of long-running series World in Action, ITV broadcast a 30-minute documentary about Green and his election to Durham council, entitled "Conversations with a Gay Liberal". Council colleagues opposed production of the documentary, and banned filming in the Durham council chambers.

The documentary was selected in 1974 to be preserved in the National Film Archive and was re-released on DVD in 2014 as part of World in Action: Volume 4.

== Legacy ==
In 2025, City of Durham parish council, with the support of Stonewall, agreed to place a blue plaque commemorating Green on 40 The Avenue, which had been his house at the time of his first election. The plaque was unveiled on 16 November 2025 by Sir Ed Davey MP, leader of the Liberal Democrats (which succeeded the Liberal Party which Green represented).

== See also ==
- List of the first LGBT holders of political offices in the United Kingdom
