= Cole Tucker (actor) =

American actor in gay pornography

- Born: Richard Allen Karp; October 23, 1953; New York City, United States
- Died: June 7, 2015 (aged 61); Palm Springs, California, U.S.
- Height: 6 ft 0 in (1.83 m)

Richard Allen Karp (October 23, 1953 – June 7, 2015), better known by his stage name Cole Tucker, was an American actor in gay pornography, born in New York.

== Career ==
Tucker started making appearances in gay pornography in 1996 at the age of 43, previously working as a realtor. In 1998, he appeared in Sex/Life in L.A. Jochen Hick's adult documentary about the sex lives of the men who make L.A. adult movies. In 1999, he revealed in a story published in the London Standard that he was HIV-positive and also had a relationship with former British Conservative Party MEP Tom Spencer.

In 2000 he was one of the celebrity gay porn stars taking part in the "Pillage & Plunder" cruise to benefit Pride Tampa Bay. He was involved with South African TV director Ken Kirsten and they lived in Johannesburg. Kirsten was shot dead outside their home one Sunday evening in April 2006. Although police did not carry out a criminal investigation, Karp left South Africa shortly after the shooting. He died of an AIDS-related illness on June 7, 2015, in Palm Springs, California.

== Awards ==
- 1997 Men in Video Awards (Probie) winner of Best Top.
- 1998 Men in Video Awards (Probie) winner of Best Actor.
- 1998 Grabby Awards winner Best performer.
- 1998 GayVN Awards winner of Gay performer of the year and Best supporting actor.
- 2000 GayVN Awards winner of Special Achievement Award for AIDS causes.
- 2000 Grabby Awards Hall of Fame.

== See also ==
- List of male performers in gay porn films
