= James Moorhouse (politician) =

British politician (1924–2014)

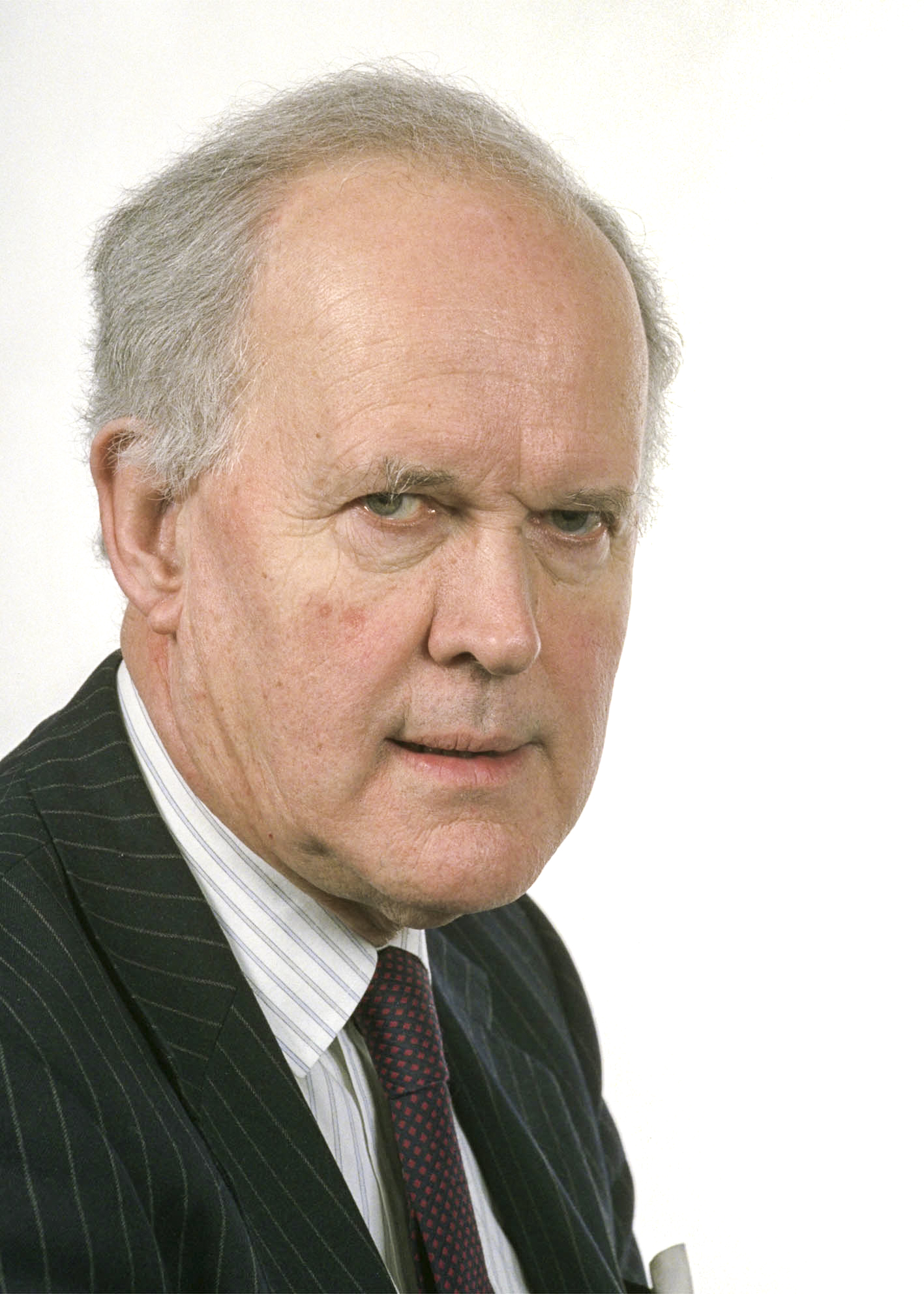
- Moorhouse in 1994

Member of the European Parliament for London South
- In office 1979–1984

Member of the European Parliament for London South and Surrey East
- In office 1984–1999

Personal details
- Born: 1 January 1924
- Died: 6 January 2014 (aged 90)
- Party: Conservative; Liberal Democrat
- Education: King's College London; Imperial College London

Cecil James Olaf Moorhouse (1 January 1924 – 6 January 2014) was a British politician who was a Member of the European Parliament from 1979 to 1999.

He was educated at St Paul's School, London, King's College London (BSc Eng, 1945) and Imperial College London where here took a diploma in advanced aeronautics. He served as Conservative MEP for London South from 1979 to 1984, and as Conservative MEP for London South and Surrey East from 1984 until October 1998 when he "defected to the Liberal Democrats after disagreeing with Mr Hague's policy on the euro." He remained in the European Parliament as Liberal Democrat MEP for London South and Surrey East until 1999.
