= London South and Surrey East (European Parliament constituency) =

Former European Parliament constituency

- European Parliament constituency
- Boundary within South East England (1984–1994)
- Member state: United Kingdom
- Created: 1984
- Dissolved: 1999
- MEPs: 1

Prior to its uniform adoption of proportional representation in 1999, the United Kingdom used first-past-the-post for the European elections in England, Scotland and Wales. The European Parliament constituencies used under that system were smaller than the later regional constituencies and only had one Member of the European Parliament each.

The constituency of London South and Surrey East was one of them. It was merged from the London South and Surrey constituencies.

When it was created in England in 1984, it consisted of the Westminster Parliament constituencies of Carshalton and Wallington, Croydon Central, Croydon North East, Croydon North West, Croydon South, East Surrey, Reigate and Sutton and Cheam. In 1989, the Surrey Mirror reported that the total electorate was around 454,000.

In boundary changes which took effect at the 1994 European election, it lost the Reigate constituency but gained Epsom and Ewell.

Boundary within South East England and London (1994-1999)

== Members of the European Parliament ==
Election	Member	Party
1984	James Moorhouse	Conservative
1989	James Moorhouse	Conservative
1994	James Moorhouse	Conservative
1998	James Moorhouse	Liberal Democrat
1999	Constituency abolished: see London	

== Election results ==
European Parliament election, 1984: London South and Surrey East
Party	Candidate	Votes	%	±%
Conservative	James Moorhouse	82,122	53.3	N/A
Labour	Andrew S. Mackinlay	37,465	24.3	N/A
Liberal	John Gordon Parry	34,522	22.4	N/A
Majority		44,657	29.0	N/A
Turnout		154,109	30.5	N/A
Conservative win (new seat)				

European Parliament election, 1989: London South and Surrey East
Party	Candidate	Votes	%	±%
Conservative	James Moorhouse	78,256	45.4	▼7.9
Labour	Robert J. E. Evans	47,440	27.5	▲3.2
Green	Graham F. Brand	31,854	18.5	N/A
SLD	Peter Hasler Billenness	14,967	8.7	▼13.7
Majority		30,816	17.9	▼11.1
Turnout		172,517	34.8	▲4.3
Conservative hold		Swing	▼5.6	

European Parliament election, 1994: London South and Surrey East
Party	Candidate	Votes	%	±%
Conservative	James Moorhouse	64,813	38.8	▼6.6
Labour	Mrs. Gillian M. Roles	56,074	33.5	▲6.0
Liberal Democrats	Mark O. R. Reinisch	32,059	19.2	▲10.5
Green	John K. W. Cornford	7,048	4.2	▼14.2
Monster Raving Loony	John Major (Note: Pseudonym)	3,339	2.0	N/A
Independent	Anthony Reeve	2,982	1.8	N/A
Natural Law	Paul J. Levy	887	0.5	N/A
Majority		8,739	5.3	▼12.6
Turnout		167,202	34.4	▼0.4
Conservative hold		Swing	▼6.3	
