= London South (European Parliament constituency) =

Former European Parliament constituency

- European Parliament constituency
- Boundary within London (1979-1984)
- Member state: United Kingdom
- Created: 1979
- Dissolved: 1984
- MEPs: 1

Prior to its uniform adoption of proportional representation in 1999, the United Kingdom used first-past-the-post for the European elections in England, Scotland and Wales. The European Parliament constituencies used under that system were smaller than the later regional constituencies and only had one Member of the European Parliament each.

The constituency of London South was one of them.

When it was created in England in 1979, it consisted of the Westminster Parliament constituencies of Carshalton, Croydon Central, Croydon North East, Croydon North West, Croydon South, Mitcham and Morden, Sutton and Cheam, Wimbledon. However, from 1984 onwards it was merged into London South and Surrey East, having been combined with half of the former Surrey Constituency.

== Members of the European Parliament ==
Elected	Members	Party
1979	James Moorhouse	Conservative
1984	Constituency abolished	

== Election results ==
European Parliament election, 1979: London South
Party	Candidate	Votes	%	±%
Conservative	James Moorhouse	98,298	58.9	N/A
Labour	G.A. Duncan	44,967	27.0	N/A
Liberal	Bill Pitt	23,526	14.1	N/A
Majority		53,331	31.9	N/A
Turnout		166,791	33.4	N/A
Conservative win (new seat)				
