= Neville's Cross =

Coordinates: 54.77245°N 1.59335°W

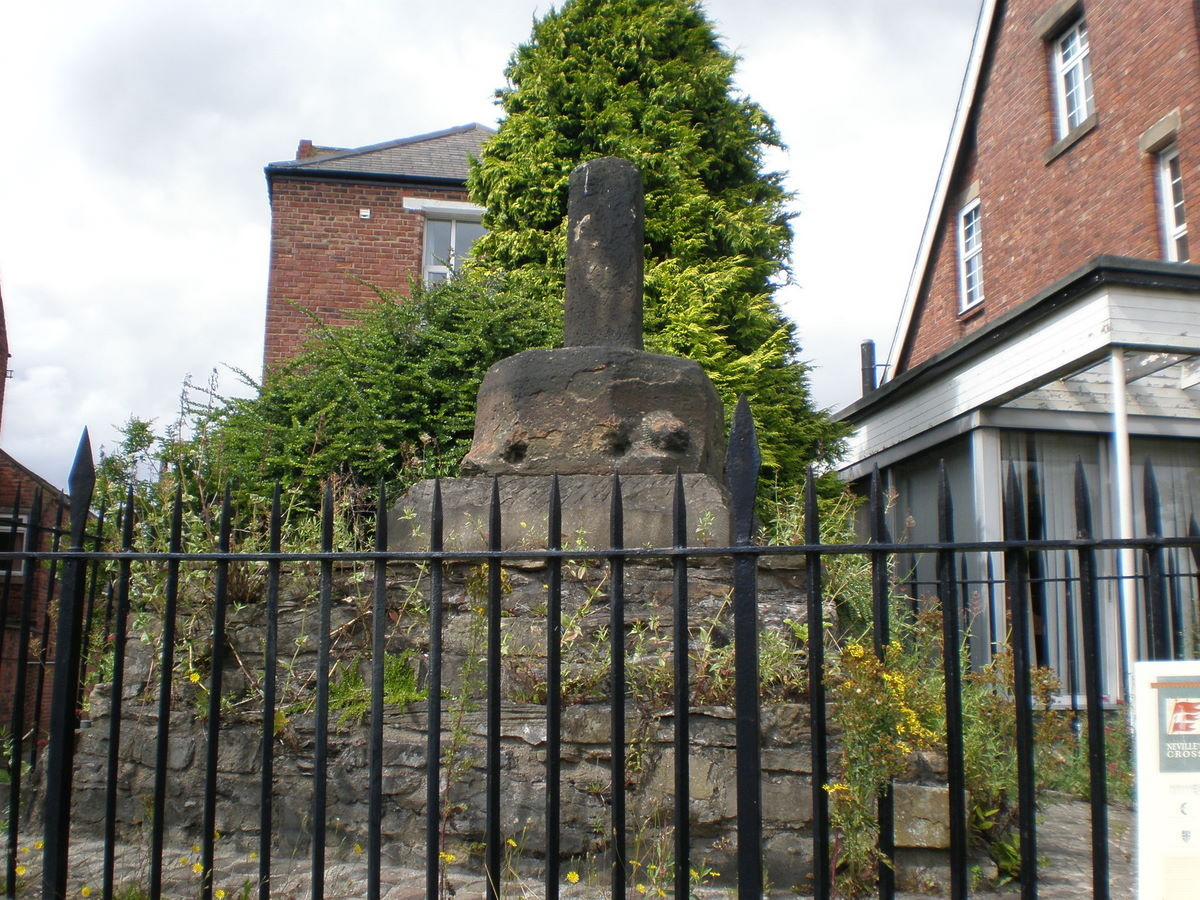
- Remains of Neville's Cross on Crossgate in Durham (August 2008)

- Location within County Durham
- Population: 9,940 (2011 census)
- Civil parish: City of Durham
- Unitary authority: County Durham
- Ceremonial county: Durham
- Region: North East
- Country: England
- Sovereign state: United Kingdom

Neville's Cross is a place in the civil parish of the City of Durham, in County Durham, England. It is also a ward of Durham with a population taken at the 2011 census of 9,940. It is situated on the A167 trunk road to the west of the centre of Durham.

The area is primarily residential, although there is a newsagent, a church, some public houses and two primary schools located there. The suburb is also home to Ustinov College, the postgraduate college of Durham University.

== History ==
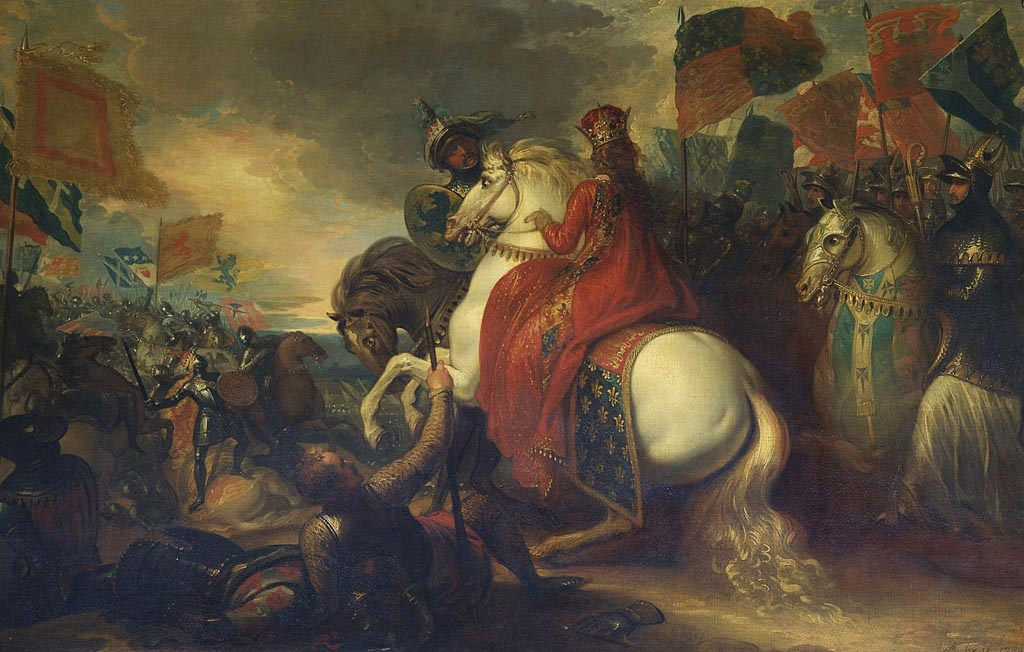
Queen Philippa at the Battle of Neville's Cross by Benjamin West, 1789

A medieval cross is believed to have stood in the area, presumably erected by, or named for, a member of the influential local Neville family, owners of the Honour of Brancepeth. Neville's Cross would have marked the point where pilgrims approaching Durham from the west, along the old Roman road from Willington and Brancepeth, would have first been able to see Durham Cathedral, the shrine of St Cuthbert. Similar crosses stood by the main roads into Durham from the north (Aykley Heads), east (Sherburn Road Ends), southeast (Philipson's Cross near Mount Joy) and southwest (Charlie's Cross near the New Inn).

Neville's Cross was the site of the Battle of Neville's Cross where in 1346 the English successfully repelled a Scottish invasion force. Knowing that the English army was in France, David II of Scotland invaded England. After pillaging much of Northern England the Scots were met at Neville's Cross by an army of Lancastrians, Yorkshiremen and Cumbrians led by the Archbishop of York. The Scots were defeated by the smaller English army and David II was captured; he was freed on payment of a ransom eleven years later. To commemorate the battle a more lavish monument was erected to the south of the battlefield by Ralph Neville, 2nd Baron Neville de Raby.

Neville's Cross became a wealthy residential suburb of Durham late in the 19th century as development extended up Crossgate. Lying in the parish of St Margaret, that church established the mission church of St John, now a parish church in its own right. A teacher training college was built by the county council; this is now converted to university student accommodation. Major growth followed the widening of the Darlington and Newcastle Roads around 1960 to create what is now the A167, bridging the main east coast railway line which had severed Neville's Cross from Crossgate Moor to the north.

On 31 December 1894 Nevilles Cross became a civil parish, being formed from the rural part of Crossgate, on 1 April 1935 the parish was abolished and merged with Durham. In 1931 the parish had a population of 939.

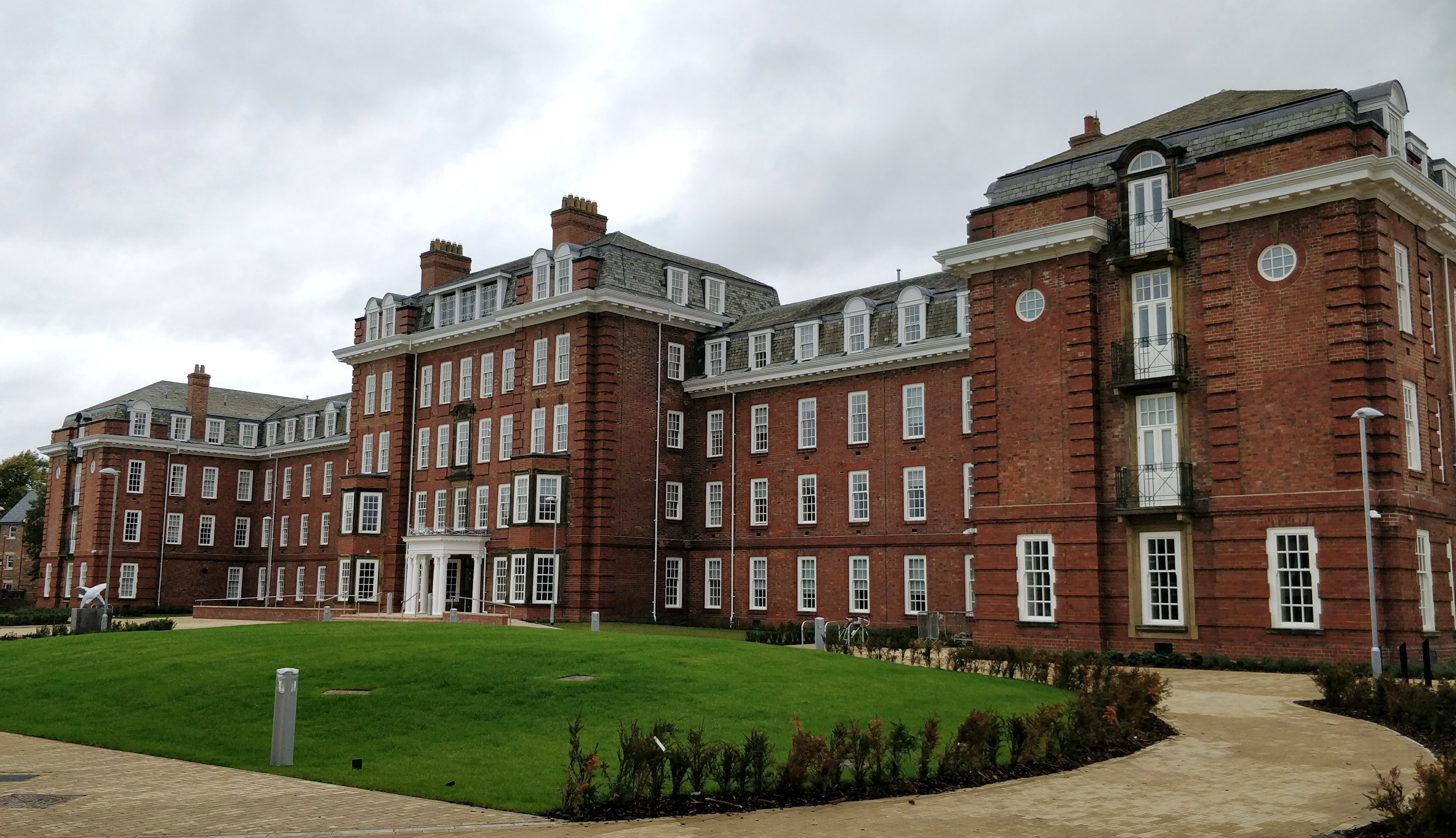
The former Neville's Cross College, now Ustinov College

The suburb was home to Neville's Cross College, a teacher training college (originally for women) established in 1921 by Durham County Council. This was affiliated to Durham University as a licensed hall of residence from 1924 and became mixed in 1963. In 1977, the college merged with Durham Technical College to form New College Durham and ceased to be affiliated to the university. New College Durham continued to use the site until 2005, when it consolidated onto its site at Framwellgate Moor. In 2018, the former Neville's Cross College became the home of Durham University's postgraduate college, Ustinov College.
