= Shaftoe =

Shaftoe may refer to:

== People ==
- Samuel Shaftoe (1841–1911), British trade unionist
- Thomas Shaftoe Robertson (1765–1831), British actor
- William Shaftoe Robertson (c. 1799–1872), British actor

== Other uses ==
- Jack Shaftoe, character
- Shaftoe Crags Settlement, archaeological site in England

== See also ==
- Shafto
