= Surrey West (European Parliament constituency) =

Former European Parliament constituency

- European Parliament constituency
- Boundary within South East England (1984-1994)
- Member state: United Kingdom
- Created: 1984
- Dissolved: 1994
- MEPs: 1

Prior to its uniform adoption of proportional representation in 1999, the United Kingdom used first-past-the-post for the European elections in England, Scotland and Wales. The European Parliament constituencies used under that system were smaller than the later regional constituencies and only had one Member of the European Parliament each.

The Surrey West constituency was created for the 1984 European Parliament election. It consisted of the Westminster Parliament constituencies of Chertsey and Walton, Esher, Guildford, Mole Valley, North West Surrey, South West Surrey, and Woking. In 1984, the Daily Telegraph reported that the total electorate in the constituency numbered 504,923.

The constituency was abolished in time for the 1994 European Election and much of the area became part of the Surrey European Parliament Constituency.

== MEPs ==
Elected	Member	Party
1984	Marquess of Douro	Conservative
1989	Tom Spencer	Conservative
1994	Constituency abolished	

== Election results ==
European Parliament election, 1984: Surrey West
Party	Candidate	Votes	%	±%
Conservative	Marquess of Douro	96,675	59.2	
SDP	Edward Mortimer	44,087	27.0	
Labour	N. K. A. S. Vaz	22,531	13.8	
Majority		52,588	32.2	
Turnout		163,293	32.3	
Conservative win (new seat)				

European Parliament election, 1989: Surrey West
Party	Candidate	Votes	%	±%
Conservative	Tom Spencer	89,674	49.8	−9.4
Green	E. H. (Ted) Haywood	40,332	22.4	New
Labour	Harold G. Trace	28,313	15.7	+1.9
SLD	Andrew Davis	18,042	10.0	−17.0
SDP	Bernard M. Collignon	3,676	2.1	New
Majority		49,342	27.4	−4.8
Turnout		180,037	34.9	+2.6
Conservative hold		Swing		
