= Crossgate, County Durham =

Coordinates: 54°46.5′N 1°34.9′W

Crossgate
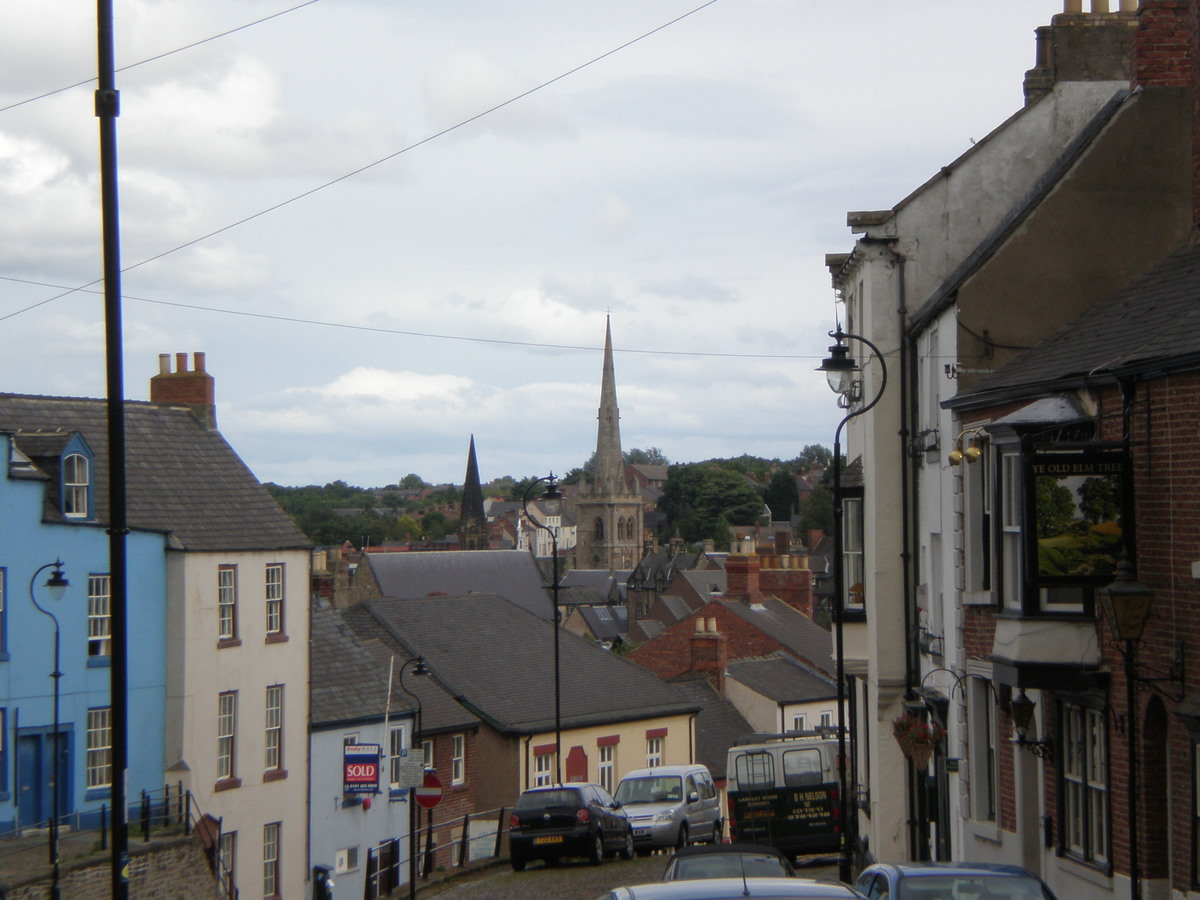

- Location within County Durham
- Civil parish: City of Durham
- Unitary authority: County Durham
- Ceremonial county: Durham
- Region: North East
- Country: England
- Sovereign state: United Kingdom
- Police: Durham
- Fire: County Durham and Darlington
- Ambulance: North East

Crossgate is a small area of housing that sits above North Road but below the Neville's Cross area of Durham, in County Durham, England. It is predominantly occupied by students at Durham University who favour the area due to its proximity to the university departments in the Elvet and Palace Green areas of the city.

== Local amenities ==
Crossgate boasts three public houses (Ye Olde Elm Tree, The Angel and The Holy GrAle), a working men's club and a pancake cafe, all of which exist as part of a cheerful community housed in pretty late Victorian brick terraced houses. St Margaret's Church, built in the 12th century, stands on a small bluff at the foot of Crossgate; its churchyard, extending from South Street up to Margery Lane, provides a significant green space in the Crossgate quarter of Durham.

== History ==
Crossgate is one of the oldest centres of Durham. In the Middle Ages, there was a borough separate from the borough of Durham, called Crossgate or Old Borough, and comprising Crossgate itself, Allergate and South Street; it was more or less coterminous with the chapelry of St Margaret of Antioch. It was under the lordship of Durham Priory and had its own borough court, but had no market of its own. Crossgate was first joined to the main centre of Durham, where the markets were held, when Bishop Flambard built Framwellgate Bridge, about the year 1128.

From being a chapelry of the parish of St Oswald's Church, St Margaret's was made an independent parish in 1431, and St Margaret's Church promoted from a chapel of ease to a parish church. The earliest parts of the church are Norman, The area of residence shrank considerably during the fourteenth and fifteenth centuries, but grew again rapidly during the nineteenth century. Crossgate's present largely residential character is at least partly the result of the nineteenth-century construction of North Road as a principal shopping street.

Durham's Union Workhouse was built in Crossgate in 1837. Its buildings (several of which still stand) were initially designed to accommodate up to 150 people from Durham and the surrounding area (Durham Poor Law Union covered 25 parishes and townships). Later known as Crossgate Hospital, it was renamed St Margaret's Hospital in 1948 (when it was incorporated into the new National Health Service). The hospital closed c. 1990, and its surviving buildings now form St Margaret's Mews (which is Grade II listed), St Margaret's Garth, part of St Margaret's Care Home and the Crossgate Centre.

Crossgate was formerly a township in the parish of St Oswald, in 1866 Crossgate became a separate civil parish, on 1 April 1916 the parish was abolished and merged with Durham. In 1911 the parish had a population of 4723.

== References and footnotes ==
- Margot Johnson. "Crossgate" in Durham: Historic and University City and surrounding area. Sixth Edition. Turnstone Ventures. 1992. ISBN 094610509X. Page 14.
