= Shafto =

Shafto is a surname. The Shafto family origins can be traced back to the Ffolliot family, which was established by the 14th century at Shafto Crag, Northumberland and adopted the alternative surname of Shafto. The following people have the name Shafto:

- Bobby Shafto, 18th century British Member of Parliament (MP), the likeliest subject of a famous North East English folk song
- Henry Shafto Harrison (1810–92) was a 19th-century Member of Parliament in Wanganui, New Zealand
- Robert Duncombe Shafto (1796–1888), British Liberal Party politician
- Robert Eden Duncombe Shafto (1776–1848), British politician from Whitworth Hall, Spennymoor, County Durham
- Robert Shafto (1690–1729) (1690–1729), British politician from Whitworth Hall, Spennymoor, County Durham

== See also ==
- Bobby Shafto's Gone to Sea
- Shaftoe (disambiguation)
