= Surrey (European Parliament constituency) =

Former European Parliament constituency

Surrey (1979-1984)
- European Parliament constituency
- Boundary within South East England (1979-1984)
- Member state: United Kingdom
- Created: 1979
- Dissolved: 1984
- MEPs: 1

Recreated
- Created: 1994
- Dissolved: 1999
- MEPs: 1

Prior to its uniform adoption of proportional representation in 1999, the United Kingdom used first-past-the-post for the European elections in England, Scotland and Wales. The European Parliament constituencies used under that system were smaller than the later regional constituencies and only had one Member of the European Parliament each.

The constituency of Surrey was one of them.

When it was created in England in 1979, it consisted of the Westminster Parliament constituencies of Chertsey and Walton, Dorking, Epsom and Ewell, Esher, Guildford, Reigate, Surrey North West, and Woking.

It was split in 1984, with the eastern half merging with London South as London South and Surrey East and the rest becoming Surrey West.

The constituency was re-created in 1994, consisting of the Westminster Parliament constituencies of Chertsey and Walton, Esher, Guildford, Mole Valley, North West Surrey, Reigate, and Woking.

Boundary within South East England and London (1994-1999)

== MEPs ==
Elected	Member	Party
1979	Marquess of Douro	Conservative
1984	Constituency abolished: see London South, London South and Surrey East, and Surrey West	
1994	Tom Spencer	Conservative
1999	Tom Spencer	Independent
1999	Constituency abolished: see South East England	

== Election results ==
European Parliament election, 1979: Surrey
Party	Candidate	Votes	%	±%
Conservative	Marquess of Douro	113,786	54.4	
Liberal	Christopher P. Mayhew	62,272	29.7	
Labour	J. Cox	28,897	13.8	
United Against the Common Market	P. A. Heims	4,450	2.1	
Majority		51,514	24.7	
Turnout		209,405	32.3	
Conservative win (new seat)				

European Parliament election, 1994: Surrey
Party	Candidate	Votes	%	±%
Conservative	Tom Spencer	83,405	43.3	
Liberal Democrats	Mrs. Susan P. Thomas	56,387	29.2	
Labour	Miss Franqui E. Wolf	30,894	16.0	
UKIP	Mrs. Sonya A. Porter	7,717	4.0	
Green	Hugo Charlton	7,198	3.7	
Independent Britain in Europe	John C. Walker	4,627	2.4	
Natural Law	Mrs. Judy M. Thomas	2,638	1.4	
Majority		27,018	14.1	
Turnout		192,866	37.5	
Conservative win (new seat)				
