= Tom Spencer (British politician) =

British Conservative Party politician (1948–2023)

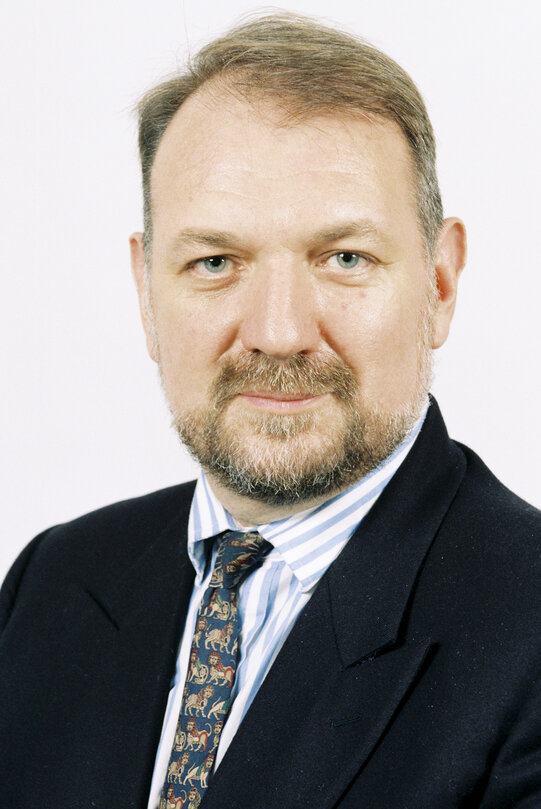

Leader of the Conservatives in the European Parliament
- In office 16 June 1994 – 16 September 1997
- Preceded by: Christopher Prout
- Succeeded by: Edward McMillan-Scott

Member of the European Parliament for Surrey
- In office 9 June 1994 – 10 June 1999
- Preceded by: Constituency created
- Succeeded by: Andrew White

Member of the European Parliament for Surrey West
- In office 15 June 1989 – 9 June 1994
- Preceded by: Marquess of Douro
- Succeeded by: Constituency abolished

Member of the European Parliament for Derbyshire
- In office 10 June 1979 – 14 June 1984
- Preceded by: Constituency created
- Succeeded by: Geoff Hoon

Personal details
- Born: 10 April 1948
- Died: 4 May 2023 (aged 75)
- Party: Conservative
- Education: University of Southampton

Thomas Newnham Bayley Spencer (10 April 1948 – 4 May 2023) was a British Conservative politician and former Member of the European Parliament (MEP).

== Life and career ==
Spencer was born on 10 April 1948. He was educated at Pangbourne Nautical College and the University of Southampton. As a student he was involved in the Federation of Conservative Students and the Young European Federalists.

Spencer served as Conservative MEP for Derbyshire from 1979 to 1984, Conservative MEP for Surrey West from 1989 to 1994, and as Conservative MEP for Surrey from 1994 to 1999. He was leader of the UK Conservative MEPs from 1995 to 1998 and was Chairman of the Parliament's Foreign Affairs Committee from 1997 to 1999.

Spencer decided not to stand for re-election to the European Parliament in 1999 after being found with gay pornography and two cannabis cigarettes in his luggage at Heathrow Airport. Spencer acknowledged being gay and said that his wife was aware of that before they married. Spencer was in a relationship with pornographic actor Cole Tucker, who was depicted in the pornography found in Spencer's luggage.

Spencer died from progressive supranuclear palsy on 4 May 2023, at the age of 75.

European Parliament
New constituency	Member of the European Parliament for Derbyshire; 1979−1984	Succeeded by Geoff Hoon
Preceded by Charles Wellesley	Member of the European Parliament for Surrey West; 1989−1994	Constituency abolished
New constituency	Member of the European Parliament for Surrey; 1994−1999	Constituency abolished
Party political offices
Preceded by Christopher Prout	Leader of the Conservatives in the European Parliament; 1994−1997	Succeeded by Edward McMillan-Scott
