= Mark Meredith =

Former mayor of Stoke-on-Trent (born 1965)

2nd Mayor of Stoke-on-Trent
- In office 5 May 2005 – 5 June 2009
- Preceded by: Mike Wolfe
- Succeeded by: Position abolished

Personal details
- Born: Mark Joseph Meredith; 21 August 1965 (age 60) Pyenest Street, Shelton, Stoke-on-Trent, England
- Party: Labour
- Occupation: Businessperson, Mayor, Councillor

Mark Joseph Meredith (born 21 August 1965 in Shelton, Stoke-on-Trent) was the second and last directly elected mayor of Stoke-on-Trent in England. An openly gay man and former amateur boxer he was elected on 5 May 2005, for the Labour Party, and defeated incumbent independent Mike Wolfe. In March 2009, Meredith was arrested on suspicion of corruption in office, but was never charged. He returned to the City Council as a Councillor for the Birches Head and Central Forest Park ward at the 2011 local elections serving until his defeat in 2015. On 8 May it was confirmed that he had not been re-elected for his ward for another term of office and had been replaced by a candidate of the City Independent group in Stoke-on-Trent.

== Political career ==
A member of the Labour Party since 1982, Meredith held posts at various levels of the Labour Party, including time representing the West Midlands as a member of the national committee of the Labour Party's youth section, the Labour Party Young Socialists (LPYS), before it was disbanded in 1987. He also worked for several years during this time as a youth organiser for the Militant tendency. A local businessman in the Stoke-on-Trent town of Hanley since 1991, he was selected as Labour's mayoral candidate in December 2004, defeating four others to win the nomination.

=== 2005 Mayoral election ===
In the mayoral election of 5 May 2005 Meredith polled ahead of the Conservative candidate Roger Ibbs, who was in second place, Mike Wolfe (independent), a BNP candidate and three non-aligned independents.

=== Time as Mayor ===
Meredith concentrated much of his efforts on bringing the City Council's long-term financial deficits under control.

In July 2007 Meredith formed a de facto executive model for Stoke-on-Trent City Council of Mayor and Cabinet in all but name. This first move away from the Mayor and Council Manager model (the only one of its kind in England) was generally welcomed by most political groups represented on the council. The Council Executive was represented in its number from all three main political parties, Labour, Conservative and Liberal Democrats.

=== October 2008 referendum ===
Stoke's second referendum was held after the government withdrew the option of Elected Mayor and Manager as an executive arrangement. Democracy4Stoke campaigned to replace the system with a Council Leader and Cabinet model. People's Choice campaigned for an Elected Mayor and Cabinet. In the referendum, held on 23 October 2008. 21,231 voted for a council leader and cabinet, and 14,592 for an elected mayor and cabinet. The turnout was 19.23%. As a result of the referendum the position of directly elected mayor was abolished as of 5 June 2009, when Meredith's term of office ended. The City Council elected a Council Leader, Conservative Ross Irving, to replace him.

=== Arrest ===
On 6 March 2009 Meredith was arrested on suspicion of corruption in office. A Conservative Party councillor, Roger Ibbs, had been arrested a week earlier on the same charge. The police inquiry was focused on the city council's attempts to close the splash pool at Dimensions Leisure Centre, in Burslem, the previous year. He resigned all of his political positions on 8 March 2009 with the investigation ongoing.

On 7 July 2009 Staffordshire Police announced that they would proceed no further with the case, and that all charges against Ibbs were being dropped. Meredith had never been charged. There was insufficient evidence to support any case for corruption against either of the men.

=== Return to politics ===
Meredith ran for election in the council ward of Birches Head and Central Forest Park, motivated by the cutbacks announced by David Cameron's central government. A dual seat ward, he topped the polls with 1,145 votes (25.92%), with unaffiliated candidate Paul Breeze also being elected.
