= Derbyshire (European Parliament constituency) =

Former European Parliament constituency

- European Parliament constituency
- Boundary within the East Midlands (1979-1984)
- Member state: United Kingdom
- Created: 1979
- Dissolved: 1994
- MEPs: 1

Prior to its uniform adoption of proportional representation in 1999, the United Kingdom used first-past-the-post for the European elections in England, Scotland and Wales. The European Parliament constituencies used under that system were smaller than the later regional constituencies and only had one Member of the European Parliament each. The constituency of Derbyshire was one of them.

When it was created in 1979, it consisted of the Westminster Parliament constituencies of Belper, Bolsover, Derby North, Derby South, Derbyshire South East, Derbyshire West, High Peak, and Ilkeston. From 1984 until its abolition, it consisted of Amber Valley; Ashfield; Bolsover; Derby North; Derby South; Derbyshire West; Erewash; and High Peak.

Boundary within the East Midlands (1984-1994)

== MEPs ==
Election	Member	Party
1979	Tom Spencer	Conservative
1984	Geoff Hoon	Labour
1994	Constituency abolished	

== Election results ==
European Parliament election, 1979: Derbyshire
Party	Candidate	Votes	%	±%
Conservative	Tom Spencer	81,046	50.9	
Labour	Miss Maeve J. Denby	62,347	39.2	
Liberal	D. W. E. Blackburn	15,775	9.9	
Majority		18,699	11.7	
Turnout		159,168	30.1	
Conservative win (new seat)				

European Parliament election, 1984: Derbyshire
Party	Candidate	Votes	%	±%
Labour	Geoff Hoon	79,446	43.4	+4.2
Conservative	Tom Spencer	72,613	39.7	−11.2
SDP	Miss Judith M. Elles	30,824	16.9	+7.0
Majority		6,853	3.7	N/A
Turnout		182,883	33.1	
Labour gain from Conservative		Swing		

European Parliament election, 1989: Derbyshire
Party	Candidate	Votes	%	±%
Labour	Geoff Hoon	106,018	51.0	+7.6
Conservative	J. P. (Philip) Jenkinson	72,630	34.9	−4.8
Green	Eric Wall	20,781	10.0	New
SLD	Simon P. Molloy	4,613	2.2	−14.7
SDP	Mrs. Aileen M. Ayres	3,858	1.9	New
Majority		33,388	16.1	+12.4
Turnout		207,900	36.8	+3.7
Labour hold		Swing		
