= Mike Wolfe (politician) =

English politician & mayor

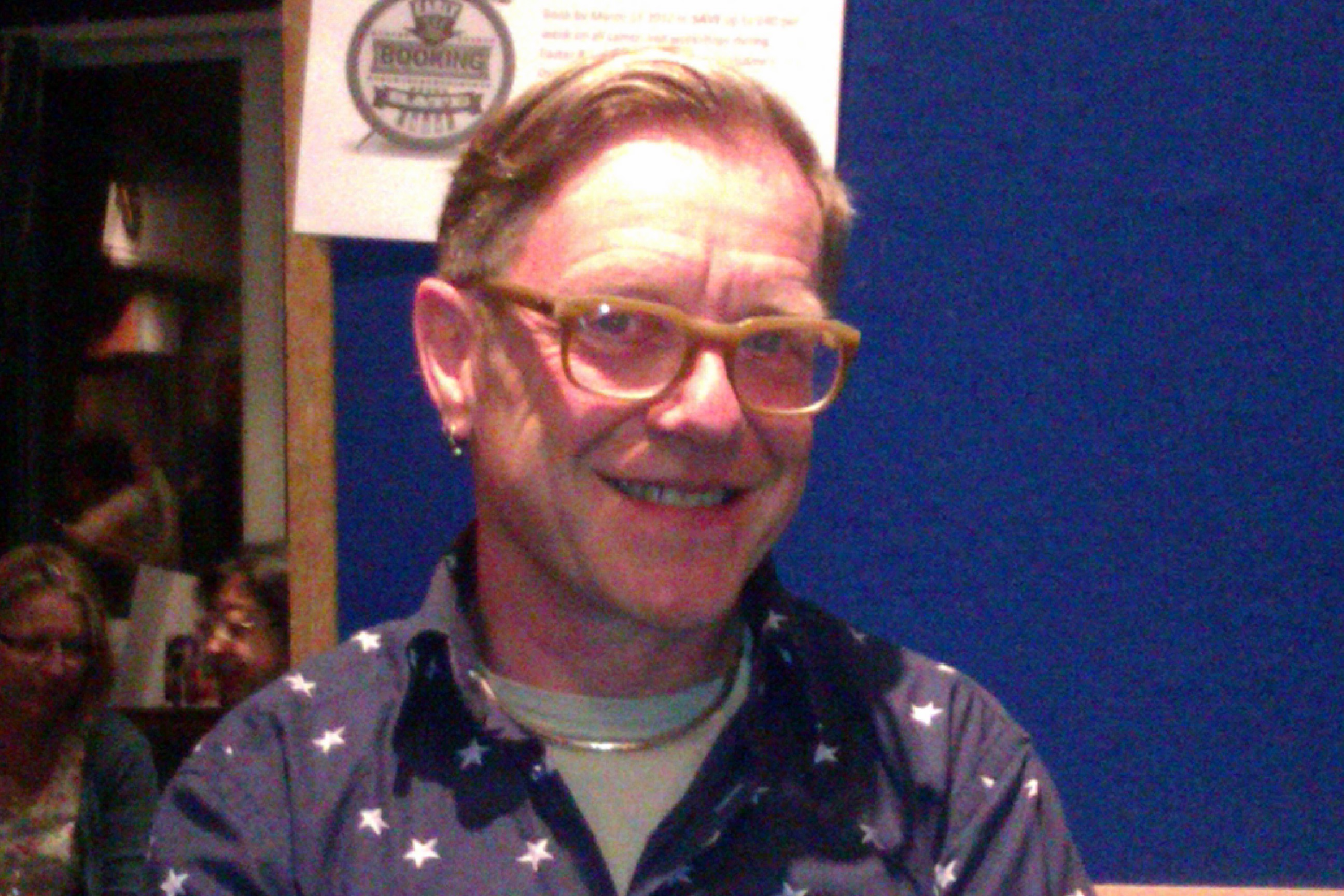

1st Mayor of Stoke-on-Trent
- In office October 2002 – 5 May 2005
- Preceded by: Position established
- Succeeded by: Mark Meredith

Personal details
- Born: Yorkshire, England
- Party: Mayor4Stoke
- Other political affiliations: Labour (until 2002)
- Occupation: Mayor

Mike Wolfe is an English former politician. He was the first directly elected mayor of Stoke-on-Trent, sitting in office from 2002 to 2005. He was formerly employed as the manager of the Citizens Advice Bureau in the city.

== Career ==
=== Time as Mayor ===
Wolfe left the Labour Party to stand as an independent in the mayoral race of October 2002 and narrowly beat George Stevenson, a local Labour member of Parliament. Both Wolfe and his successor Mark Meredith are openly gay.

Wolfe came third out of eight in his bid for re-election in May 2005 when Labour gained the position of elected mayor. The election was notable for a record number of spoiled ballot papers.

=== Post-2005 ===
He later became a columnist for a local paper, The Sentinel.
