= Grade I listed buildings in County Durham =

County Durham shown in England

There are more than 9000 Grade I listed buildings in England. This page is a list of these buildings in the county of Durham, sub-divided by unitary authority.

== County Durham ==
Name	Location	Type	Completed (Note: The date given is the date used by Historic England as significant for the initial building or that of an important part in the structure's description.)	Date designated	Grid ref. (Note: The grid reference is based on the British national grid reference system, sometimes known as OSGB36, used by the Ordnance Survey.) Geo-coordinates	Entry number (Note: The "List Entry Number" is a unique number assigned to each listed building and scheduled monument by Historic England.)	Image
Barnard Castle Bridge (that Part in Barnard Castle Civil Parish) and Attached Wall to South East	River Tees, Barnard Castle	Wall	14th century	24 February 1950	NZ0481216389; 54°32′34″N 1°55′38″W	1201056	Barnard Castle Bridge (that Part in Barnard Castle Civil Parish) and Attached Wall to South East More images
Blagraves	Barnard Castle	House	16th/17th century	24 February 1950	NZ0501616219; 54°32′28″N 1°55′26″W	1201313	Blagraves More images
Bowes Museum with steps and railings	Barnard Castle	Museum	1869–c. 1885	24 February 1950	NZ0556416317; 54°32′32″N 1°54′56″W	1292074	Bowes Museum with steps and railings More images
Bowes Museum Terrace walls, steps and heraldic beasts to the south	Barnard Castle	Balustrade	c. 1885	28 November 1994	NZ0556416270; 54°32′30″N 1°54′56″W	1218235	Bowes Museum Terrace walls, steps and heraldic beasts to the south
Church of St Mary	Barnard Castle	Church	12th-14th century	24 February 1950	NZ0507716271; 54°32′30″N 1°55′23″W	1218277	Church of St Mary More images
Barnard Castle Market Cross	Barnard Castle	Market Cross	1747	24 February 1950	NZ0503216330; 54°32′32″N 1°55′25″W	1201323	Barnard Castle Market Cross More images
Barnard Castle	Barnard Castle	Castle	c. 1095	24 February 1950	NZ0487516466; 54°32′36″N 1°55′34″W	1218822	Barnard Castle More images
Auckland Castle	Bishop Auckland	Castle	Medieval	21 April 1952	NZ2134130200; 54°39′59″N 1°40′14″W	1196444	Auckland Castle More images
Auckland Castle entrance gateway	Bishop Auckland	Gatehouse	1760	21 April 1952	NZ2130030124; 54°39′57″N 1°40′17″W	1297645	Auckland Castle entrance gateway More images
Auckland Castle west mural tower and west walls	Bishop Auckland	Palace	c. 1660	21 April 1952	NZ2125430199; 54°39′59″N 1°40′19″W	1196445	Auckland Castle west mural tower and west walls More images
Auckland Castle Lodge	Bishop Auckland	Lodge	17th century	21 April 1952	NZ2131030111; 54°39′56″N 1°40′16″W	1297529	Auckland Castle Lodge More images
Auckland Castle Chapel	Bishop Auckland	Chapel	c. 1190 - early 13th century	21 April 1952	NZ2138730249; 54°40′01″N 1°40′12″W	1196446	Auckland Castle Chapel More images
Auckland Castle Screen and garden walls	Bishop Auckland	Wall	c. 1795	21 April 1952	NZ2140630168; 54°39′58″N 1°40′11″W	1196448	Auckland Castle Screen and garden walls More images
Auckland Castle Deer Shelter	Bishop Auckland	Deer shelter	c. 1760	21 April 1952	NZ2159530444; 54°40′07″N 1°40′00″W	1297608	Auckland Castle Deer Shelter More images
Newton Cap Bridge	Bishop Auckland	Bridge	late 14th century	21 April 1952	NZ2051230258; 54°40′01″N 1°41′01″W	1292118	Newton Cap Bridge More images
Biddick Hall	Lambton Park, Bournmoor	House	Early 18th century	1 February 1967	NZ3145352792; 54°52′08″N 1°30′41″W	1120989	Biddick Hall More images
Bowes Castle	Bowes	Castle	1171-87	17 June 1986	NY9923413504; 54°31′01″N 2°00′48″W	1121039	Bowes Castle More images
Brancepeth Castle	Brancepeth	Castle	1216	10 May 1967	NZ2232037710; 54°44′02″N 1°39′18″W	1159012	Brancepeth Castle More images
Church of St Brandon	Brancepeth	Church	Late 12th century	10 May 1967	NZ2247937696; 54°44′01″N 1°39′09″W	1158956	Church of St Brandon More images
Sunderland Bridge	Sunderland Bridge, Croxdale and Hett	Bridge	14th century	10 May 1967	NZ2652037766; 54°44′03″N 1°35′23″W	1311172	Sunderland Bridge More images
Sunderland Bridge	Brandon and Byshottles	Bridge	14th century	3 May 1967	NZ2651437769; 54°44′03″N 1°35′23″W	1120699	Sunderland Bridge More images
Church 50 Metres North East of Croxdale Hall	Croxdale Hall, Croxdale and Hett	Church	Late 11th -early 12th century	10 May 1967	NZ2740437912; 54°44′08″N 1°34′33″W	1120740	Church 50 Metres North East of Croxdale Hall More images
Croxdale Hall	Croxdale, Croxdale and Hett	House	17th century	10 May 1967	NZ2734137856; 54°44′06″N 1°34′37″W	1159140	Croxdale Hall More images
East Deanery	South Church, Dene Valley	Courtyard	Shortly After 1293	21 April 1952	NZ2157928301; 54°38′58″N 1°40′02″W	1196576	
Church of St Mary	Easington	Church	Early 13th century	20 February 1967	NZ4142843445; 54°47′03″N 1°21′26″W	1231813	Church of St Mary More images
Seaton Holme	Easington	House	c. 1600	6 August 1952	NZ4136443520; 54°47′06″N 1°21′30″W	1231692	Seaton Holme More images
Ruins of Egglestone Abbey	Egglestone Abbey	Abbey	1195–1198	28 October 1987	NZ0623815121; 54°31′53″N 1°54′18″W	1322741	Ruins of Egglestone Abbey More images
Complex of Chapels at the College of St Cuthbert, Ushaw	Ushaw, Esh, County Durham	Theological College	1882-5	17 January 1967	NZ2184443702; 54°47′16″N 1°39′43″W	1116449	Complex of Chapels at the College of St Cuthbert, Ushaw
Finchale Priory	Framwellgate Moor	Priory	15th century	10 May 1967	NZ2964347130; 54°49′05″N 1°32′25″W	1159246	Finchale Priory More images
Church of St Mary	Gainford	Church	Early 13th century	14 September 1966	NZ1697116683; 54°32′42″N 1°44′21″W	1121114	Church of St Mary More images
Gainford Hall	Gainford	House	c. 1603	7 January 1952	NZ1682416854; 54°32′48″N 1°44′29″W	1323010	Gainford Hall More images
Church of St Andrew	Great Aycliffe	Cross	Late 10th century	12 November 1980	NZ2830622163; 54°35′38″N 1°33′48″W	1322806	Church of St Andrew More images
Church of St James	Hamsterley, Bishop Auckland	Church	1803	14 September 1966	NZ1272930895; 54°40′23″N 1°48′15″W	1322777	Church of St James More images
Church of St Helen	Kelloe	Cross	12th century	10 May 1967	NZ3450936542; 54°43′22″N 1°27′57″W	1120748	Church of St Helen More images
Church of All Saints	Lanchester	Church	12th century	17 January 1967	NZ1676247392; 54°49′16″N 1°44′26″W	1185983	Church of All Saints More images
Lumley Castle	Chester-le-Street	Castle	1382	4 June 1952	NZ2876851054; 54°51′12″N 1°33′12″W	1120960	Lumley Castle More images
Remains of Manor House at Priory Farm	Muggleswick	Lodge	13th century	6 February 1952	NZ0443550021; 54°50′42″N 1°55′57″W	1260912	Remains of Manor House at Priory Farm More images
Church of St Laurence	Hallgarth, Pittington	Church	15th century	10 May 1967	NZ3288143579; 54°47′10″N 1°29′25″W	1310892	Church of St Laurence More images
Elemore Hall School and Doorway and Archway Attached	Pittington	House	19th century	28 February 1952	NZ3510044168; 54°47′28″N 1°27′20″W	1120730	Elemore Hall School and Doorway and Archway Attached More images
Raby Castle	Staindrop	Castle	Early-Mid 14th century	7 January 1952	NZ1292321766; 54°35′27″N 1°48′06″W	1338625	Raby Castle More images
Raby Castle Gatehouse	Staindrop	Wall	14th century	14 September 1966	NZ1289021841; 54°35′30″N 1°48′07″W	1338626	Raby Castle Gatehouse More images
Rokeby Park and attached stables	Rokeby Park	House	1725–31	19 January 1952	NZ0828214181; 54°31′22″N 1°52′25″W	1121680	Rokeby Park and attached stables More images
Rokeby Park Mortham Tower	Rokeby Park	House	20th century	19 January 1952	NZ0861014209; 54°31′23″N 1°52′07″W	1160832	Rokeby Park Mortham Tower More images
Church of St Romald	Romaldkirk	Church	Late 12th – early 13th century	12 January 1967	NY9951922126; 54°35′40″N 2°00′32″W	1121857	Church of St Romald More images
Church of St Mary	Seaham	Church	1773	21 June 1950	NZ4224350500; 54°50′51″N 1°20′37″W	1232116	Church of St Mary More images
Church of St Edmund	Sedgefield	Church	c. 1490	9 January 1968	NZ3568028823; 54°39′12″N 1°26′55″W	1121482	Church of St Edmund More images
Church of St Mary	Staindrop	Church	Early 15th century to c. 1544	14 September 1966	NZ1310220638; 54°34′51″N 1°47′56″W	1338594	Church of St Mary More images
Causey Arch	Stanley	Bridge	1727	19 July 1950	NZ2012655896; 54°53′51″N 1°41′16″W	1240816	Causey Arch More images
Causey Burn Culvert, arch and retaining walls	Stanley	Walls	1717	21 January 1987	NZ2038356055; 54°53′56″N 1°41′01″W	1260837	Causey Burn Culvert, arch and retaining walls
Walls, Piers, Steps, Gates and Railings in Front of Tanfield Hall	Tanfield, Stanley	Walls	Early 18th century	19 July 1950	NZ1887455432; 54°53′36″N 1°42′26″W	1260787	Walls, Piers, Steps, Gates and Railings in Front of Tanfield Hall
Barnard Castle Bridge, over the River Tees	Startforth	Bridge	1569	12 January 1967	NZ0479616387; 54°32′34″N 1°55′39″W	1121647	Barnard Castle Bridge, over the River Tees More images
The Old Manor House Hotel	West Auckland	House	15th century	21 April 1952	NZ1791826357; 54°37′55″N 1°43′26″W	1209970	The Old Manor House Hotel More images
Church of St Andrew	Winston	Church	Mid 13th century	14 September 1966	NZ1435016873; 54°32′49″N 1°46′47″W	1160127	Church of St Andrew More images
Church of St Mary	Wycliffe	Church	Mid 13th century	12 January 1967	NZ1168414324; 54°31′27″N 1°49′16″W	1322763	Church of St Mary More images
Durham Castle: North Range	Durham	Castle	c. 1072	6 May 1952	NZ2734542387; 54°46′32″N 1°34′35″W	1160921	Durham Castle: North Range More images
Durham Castle: West Range	Durham	Castle	Late 15th century	6 May 1952	NZ2732042359; 54°46′31″N 1°34′37″W	1121383	Durham Castle: West Range More images
Durham Castle: Keep	Durham	Keep	1345-81	6 May 1952	NZ2739542357; 54°46′31″N 1°34′32″W	1322868	Durham Castle: Keep More images
Durham Castle: Bastion behind No. 50 and wall attached	Durham	Bastion	Late Medieval	10 March 1988	NZ2743442368; 54°46′32″N 1°34′30″W	1322897	
Durham Castle: Gatehouse, entrance gateway, side walls, linking walls and front wall	Durham	Gatehouse	c. 1790	6 May 1952	NZ2735042336; 54°46′31″N 1°34′35″W	1322867	Durham Castle: Gatehouse, entrance gateway, side walls, linking walls and front wall More images
Durham Castle walls: Terrace wall behind Nos 7-18 consecutive	Durham	Wall	Medieval	6 May 1952	NZ2736242401; 54°46′33″N 1°34′34″W	1323246	
Durham Castle walls: Wall around motte on west, north and east sides	Durham	Wall	Medieval	6 May 1952	NZ2731242413; 54°46′33″N 1°34′37″W	1120631	
Durham Castle walls: Wall behind Hatfield College	Durham	Wall	12th century	6 May 1952	NZ2751242273; 54°46′29″N 1°34′26″W	1121422	
Durham Castle walls: Wall behind No.3	Durham	Wall	12th century	6 May 1952	NZ2749442340; 54°46′31″N 1°34′27″W	1322845	
Durham Castle walls: Wall behind Nos. 16-22 and No.22a (St Chad's)	Durham	Wall	12th century	6 May 1952	NZ2749042085; 54°46′23″N 1°34′27″W	1121431	
Durham Castle walls: Wall behind Nos. 26-28	Durham	Wall	12th century	6 May 1952	NZ2745442011; 54°46′20″N 1°34′29″W	1310622	
Durham Castle walls: Terrace wall north of Bow Lane	Durham	Wall	12th century	6 May 1952	NZ2753642150; 54°46′25″N 1°34′25″W	1120714	
Durham Castle walls: Terrace wall south of Bow Lane and east of Kingsgate	Durham	Wall	12th century	6 May 1952	NZ2753342135; 54°46′24″N 1°34′25″W	1159233	
Durham Castle walls: Wall behind Nos. 12 and 12a	Durham	Wall	12th century	10 March 1988	NZ2727741814; 54°46′14″N 1°34′39″W	1161398	
Durham Castle walls: Wall behind St John's College from Nos. 1 to 11 consecutive, and garden house attached behind No.11	Durham	Wall	Early 18th century	10 March 1988	NZ2735741854; 54°46′15″N 1°34′35″W	1322901	
Durham Castle walls: Wall to west of No.13	Durham	Wall	18th century	10 March 1988	NZ2724841871; 54°46′16″N 1°34′41″W	1121334	
Durham Castle walls: Walls attached to No.s 12 to 15	Durham	Wall	12th century	10 March 1988	NZ2726142110; 54°46′23″N 1°34′40″W	1120695	
Durham Cathedral	Durham	Cathedral	1242-c. 1280	6 May 1952	NZ2734642123; 54°46′24″N 1°34′35″W	1161023	Durham Cathedral More images
Durham Cathedral: Cloister East Range	County Durham	Cathedral	11th century	6 May 1952	NZ2735342107; 54°46′23″N 1°34′35″W	1121388	Durham Cathedral: Cloister East Range
Durham Cathedral: Cloister South Range	Durham	Cathedral	11th century	6 May 1952	NZ2731942088; 54°46′23″N 1°34′37″W	1310239	Durham Cathedral: Cloister South Range
Durham Cathedral: Cloister West Range	Durham	Cathedral	12th century	6 May 1952	NZ2729542106; 54°46′23″N 1°34′38″W	1121389	Durham Cathedral: Cloister West Range
Durham Cathedral: Lavatorium in Centre of Cloister Garth	Durham	Wash House	Medieval	6 May 1952	NZ2732242113; 54°46′24″N 1°34′37″W	1161129	Durham Cathedral: Lavatorium in Centre of Cloister Garth More images
Durham Cathedral: Prior's Kitchen (Dean and Chapter Library)	Durham	Kitchen	1366-74	6 May 1952	NZ2730142061; 54°46′22″N 1°34′38″W	1323260	Durham Cathedral: Prior's Kitchen (Dean and Chapter Library) More images
Durham Cathedral: The Deanery	Durham	Deanery	Norman	6 May 1952	NZ2735842077; 54°46′22″N 1°34′35″W	1120655	Durham Cathedral: The Deanery More images
Durham Cathedral: The Gatehouse	Durham	Gatehouse	c. 1500	6 May 1952	NZ2740742017; 54°46′20″N 1°34′32″W	1159471	Durham Cathedral: The Gatehouse
Former Cathedral Exchequer Building, now University Library	Palace Green, Durham	Library	1438–1457	10 March 1988	NZ2734442299; 54°46′30″N 1°34′35″W	1160838	Former Cathedral Exchequer Building, now University Library More images
Chapel of St Mary Magdalene	Gilesgate, Durham	Chapel	13th century	6 May 1952	NZ2826342903; 54°46′49″N 1°33′44″W	1159279	Chapel of St Mary Magdalene More images
Chorister School	Durham	Clergy House	Medieval	6 May 1952	NZ2726541963; 54°46′19″N 1°34′40″W	1159555	Chorister School More images
Church of St Andrew	South Church	Church	Late 8th/early 9th century	21 April 1952	NZ2175228470; 54°39′03″N 1°39′52″W	1196458	Church of St Andrew More images
Church of St Helen	St Helen Auckland	Church	15th century	21 April 1952	NZ1883526773; 54°38′09″N 1°42′35″W	1196602	Church of St Helen More images
Church of St Mary and St Cuthbert	Chester-le-Street	Church	Mid 13th century	29 July 1950	NZ2760351316; 54°51′21″N 1°34′18″W	1120955	Church of St Mary and St Cuthbert More images
Church of St Mary Magdalene	Medomsley	Church	13th century	6 June 1951	NZ1189154374; 54°53′02″N 1°48′58″W	1240478	Church of St Mary Magdalene More images
Church of St Giles	Gilesgate, Durham	Church	Early 13th century	6 May 1952	NZ2838842653; 54°46′41″N 1°33′37″W	1159991	Church of St Giles More images
Church of St Margaret of Antioch	Crossgate, Durham	Church	12th century	6 May 1952	NZ2712142405; 54°46′33″N 1°34′48″W	1159741	Church of St Margaret of Antioch More images
Crook Hall	Framwelgate, Durham	House	14th century	6 May 1952	NZ2744943152; 54°46′57″N 1°34′29″W	1159909	Crook Hall More images
Derwent Cote Steel Furnace (the Cone)	Hamsterley Colliery, Hameterly	Furnace	First half of 18th century	6 June 1951	NZ1304656508; 54°54′11″N 1°47′53″W	1240411	Derwent Cote Steel Furnace (the Cone) More images
Elvet Bridge	Durham, County Durham	Bridge	Late 12th century	6 May 1952	NZ2753642424; 54°46′34″N 1°34′24″W	1121355	Elvet Bridge More images
Framwellgate Bridge	Durham	Bridge	Early 12th century	6 May 1952	NZ2723742431; 54°46′34″N 1°34′41″W	1322872	Framwellgate Bridge More images
Great Gateway to Kepier Hospital (that Part Within the City of Durham)	Durham	Hospital	14th century	19 February 1970	NZ2821243266; 54°47′01″N 1°33′46″W	1121391	Great Gateway to Kepier Hospital (that Part Within the City of Durham) More images
Great Gateway to Kepier Hospital (that Part Within the Civil Parish of Belmont)	Durham	Hospital	14th century	14 January 1988	NZ2821243266; 54°47′01″N 1°33′46″W	1120725	Great Gateway to Kepier Hospital (that Part Within the Civil Parish of Belmont) More images
Loggia of Heath Family Mansion East of Great Gateway at Kepier Hospital	Durham	Loggia	Late 16th century	10 March 1988	NZ2823343248; 54°47′00″N 1°33′45″W	1310224	Loggia of Heath Family Mansion East of Great Gateway at Kepier Hospital
Kingsgate Bridge	Durham	Bridge	1963	29 May 1998	NZ2759342106; 54°46′23″N 1°34′21″W	1119766	Kingsgate Bridge More images
Prebends Bridge	Durham	Bridge	1772-8	6 May 1952	NZ2714541856; 54°46′15″N 1°34′47″W	1121354	Prebends Bridge More images
Priory Prison and Former Stables North of Number 15	Durham	Prison and stables	Medieval	6 May 1952	NZ2726942103; 54°46′23″N 1°34′39″W	1323259	Priory Prison and Former Stables North of Number 15
St Helen Hall	St Helen Auckland	House	c. 1735	21 April 1952	NZ1894626772; 54°38′09″N 1°42′29″W	1297566	St Helen Hall More images
St Mary Le Bow Heritage Centre	Durham	Church	1702	6 May 1952	NZ2747242162; 54°46′25″N 1°34′28″W	1121424	St Mary Le Bow Heritage Centre More images
The Saxon Church	Escomb	Cross	7th Century	21 April 1952	NZ1892830139; 54°39′58″N 1°42′29″W	1292122	The Saxon Church More images
No. 18 Elvet Bridge	Elvet Bridge, Durham	House	Late 19th century	30 April 1971	NZ2749642457; 54°46′35″N 1°34′27″W	1323228	
No.s 12-15 The College	The College, Durham	House	Medieval	6 May 1952	NZ2726642040; 54°46′21″N 1°34′40″W	1120694	No.s 12-15 The College More images
No. 8, The College	The College, Durham	House	Medieval	6 May 1952	NZ2730041977; 54°46′19″N 1°34′38″W	1120691	No. 8, The College More images

== Darlington ==
Name	Location	Type	Completed	Date designated	Grid ref. Geo-coordinates	Entry number	Image
Church of St Michael	Heighington	Church	18th century	20 March 1967	NZ2490322365; 54°35′45″N 1°36′58″W	1322953	Church of St Michael More images
Thornton Hall	High Coniscliffe	Farmhouse	c. 1550 – c. 1630	6 June 1952	NZ2381816991; 54°32′51″N 1°38′00″W	1121221	Thornton Hall More images
Church of All Saints	Sockburn	Cross	Pre Conquest	20 March 1967	NZ3498207113; 54°27′30″N 1°27′43″W	1185947	Church of All Saints More images
Walworth Castle	Walworth	House	c. 1600	6 June 1952	NZ2312418828; 54°33′51″N 1°38′38″W	1121175	Walworth Castle More images
Butler House and the Rectory	Haughton-le-Skerne	House	Early-mid 15th century	28 April 1952	NZ3083815930; 54°32′16″N 1°31′30″W	1121301	
Church of St Andrew	Haughton Le Skerne	Church	c. 1100	28 April 1952	NZ3082715886; 54°32′14″N 1°31′30″W	1160229	Church of St Andrew More images
Church of St Cuthbert	Darlington	Church	Early 13th century	28 April 1952	NZ2910614442; 54°31′28″N 1°33′07″W	1121280	Church of St Cuthbert More images

== Hartlepool ==
Name	Location	Type	Completed	Date designated	Grid ref. Geo-coordinates	Entry number	Image
Church of St Mary Magdalene	Hart	Church	Anglo-Saxon	16 November 1967	NZ4704835107; 54°42′32″N 1°16′17″W	1249898	Church of St Mary Magdalene More images
Church of St Hilda	Headland	Church	Early 12th century	31 March 1949	NZ5284233679; 54°41′43″N 1°10′54″W	1263355	Church of St Hilda More images
Town Wall and Sandwell Gate	Headland	Gate	Early 14th century	31 March 1949	NZ5246133698; 54°41′44″N 1°11′15″W	1250535	Town Wall and Sandwell Gate More images

== Stockton-on-Tees ==
Name	Location	Type	Completed	Date designated	Grid ref. Geo-coordinates	Entry number	Image
Church of St Cuthbert	Billingham	Church	9th century	25 January 1951	NZ4576122339; 54°35′39″N 1°17′36″W	1139241	Church of St Cuthbert More images
Church of St John the Baptist	Egglescliffe	Church	Norman	16 November 1967	NZ4206513166; 54°30′43″N 1°21′06″W	1104901	Church of St John the Baptist More images
Ruins of a Church of St Thomas a Becket	Grindon	Church	Late 12th century	16 November 1967	NZ3978125435; 54°37′21″N 1°23′08″W	1329821	Ruins of a Church of St Thomas a Becket
Church of St Peter	Hilton (Note: Technically in North Yorkshire not County Durham, but it is listed here with other listed buildings in Stockton-on-Tees)	Church	Norman	23 June 1966	NZ4656811314; 54°29′42″N 1°16′57″W	1139229	Church of St Peter More images
Church of St Cuthbert	Redmarshall	Church	Norman	16 November 1967	NZ3862221189; 54°35′04″N 1°24′14″W	1140001	Church of St Cuthbert More images
Church of St Thomas	Stockton-on-Tees	Church	Medieval	19 January 1951	NZ4457219251; 54°34′00″N 1°18′44″W	1139977	Church of St Thomas More images
Church of St Mary the Virgin	Stockton-on-Tees	Church	Early 11th century	19 January 1951	NZ4427622126; 54°35′33″N 1°18′59″W	1140012	Church of St Mary the Virgin More images

== See also ==
- Grade II* listed buildings in County Durham
