= Grade I listed buildings in North Yorkshire =

North Yorkshire shown within England

The county of North Yorkshire is divided into 5 districts, formerly 11. The districts of North Yorkshire are the namesake district, Redcar and Cleveland, Middlesbrough, part of Stockton-on-Tees and City of York.

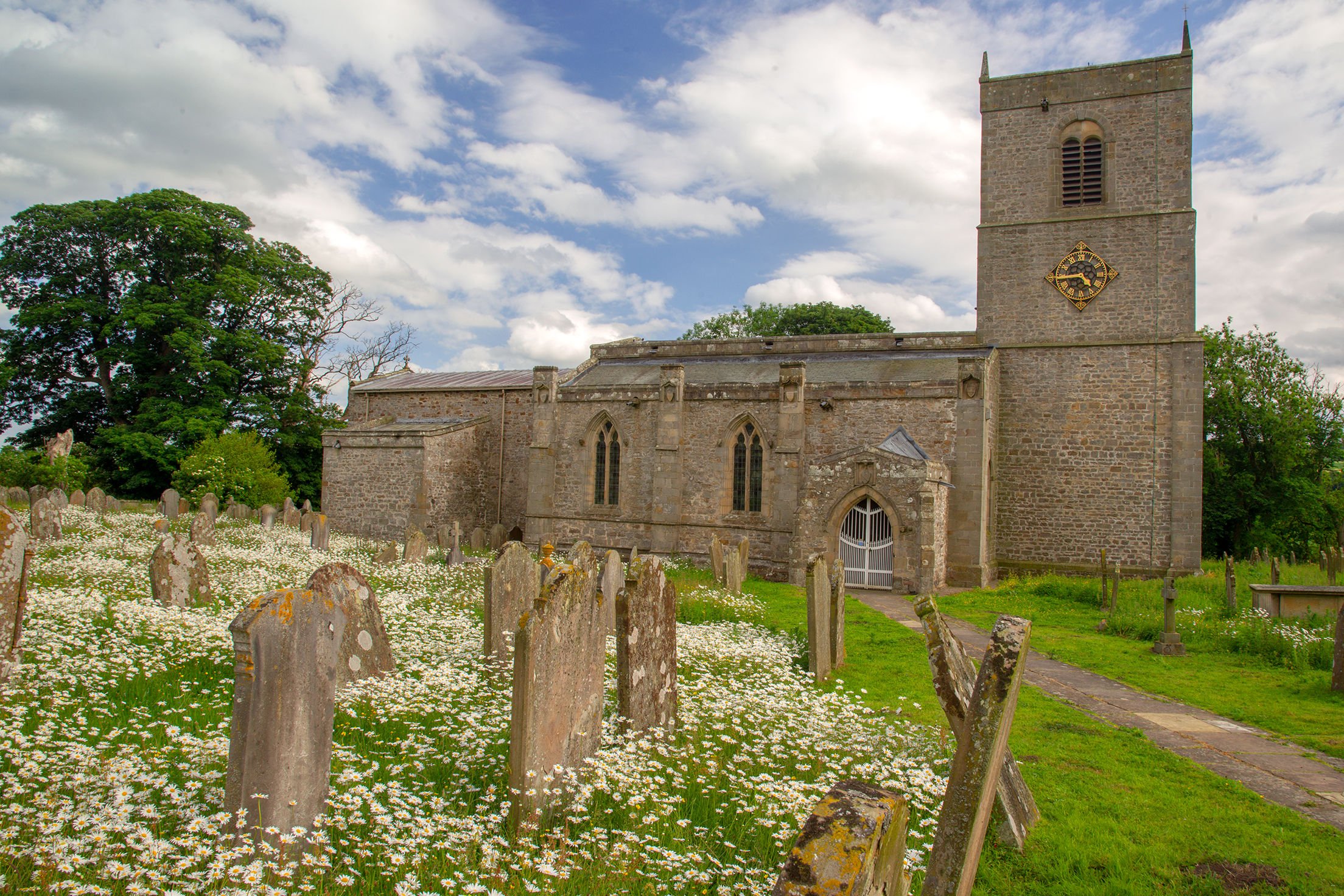
The Grade I listed Holy Trinity Church, Wensley, Richmondshire, dates from the 13th century but modifications were made in later years

As there are 364 Grade I listed buildings in the county they have been split into separate lists for each district.

- Grade I listed buildings in North Yorkshire (district)
- Grade I listed buildings in the City of York
- Grade I listed buildings in Redcar and Cleveland
- Grade I listed buildings in Middlesbrough (borough)
- Church of St Peter in Hilton, North Yorkshire (other Grade I listed buildings in Stockton-on-Tees (borough) are in County Durham)

== See also ==
- Grade II* listed buildings in North Yorkshire
