= Prebends Bridge =

Bridge in County Durham, England

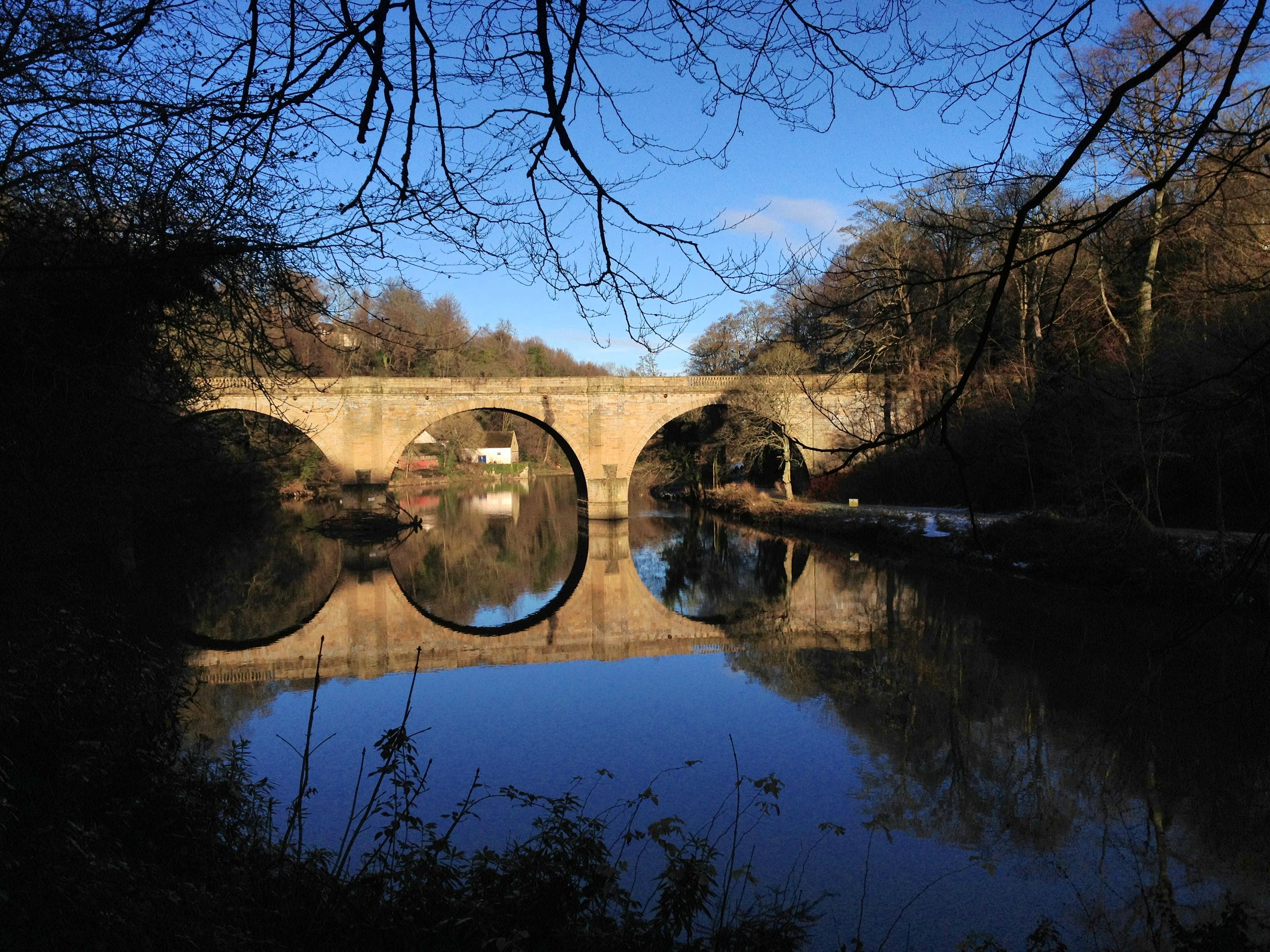
- Prebends Bridge from upstream
- Coordinates: 54.7709°N 1.5794°W
- OS grid reference: NZ271418
- Carries: Pedestrians
- Crosses: River Wear
- Locale: County Durham
- Owner: Durham Cathedral
- Heritage status: Grade I listed
- Preceded by: Kingsgate Bridge
- Followed by: Framwellgate Bridge

Characteristics
- Design: Semi-circular arch bridge
- Material: Stone
- No. of spans: 3

History
- Designer: George Nicholson
- Construction start: 1772
- Construction end: 1778

Location
- Interactive map of Prebends Bridge

Prebends Bridge, along with Framwellgate and Elvet bridges, is one of three stone-arch bridges in the centre of Durham, England, that cross the River Wear. The bridge forms part of the Durham Castle and Cathedral UNESCO World Heritage Site.

== History ==
Prebends Bridge was designed by George Nicholson and built from 1772 to 1778. The bridge was built on the instructions of the Dean of Durham and served as a private road for the Dean and Chapter of Durham, giving access from the south through the Watergate. It replaced a temporary bridge built after the footbridge, built in 1574, was swept away during a flood in 1771.

The bridge is situated below the Watergate at the end of South Bailey (with which it is in concurrence), just after St Cuthbert's Society. Although the bridge is wide enough for vehicles, it is mainly used as a footbridge as it only leads to the Riverside paths and up to a closed road barrier to South Bailey. The bridge was restored from 1955 to 1956. In autumn 2010 the bridge was temporarily reopened to road traffic under 3 tonnes while Saddler Street was closed because of extensive repaving works as part of the Heart of the City project, sponsored by Durham City Vision. The current bridge affords an excellent view of the cathedral and was built specifically with aesthetic considerations in mind - it was built slightly north of the prior bridge, at a wider part of the river, to improve the views available. Trees were planted along the riverbank to complete the Romantic picture.

Part of the estate of Durham Cathedral, the bridge is a Grade I listed building and is included in the Durham Castle and Cathedral UNESCO World Heritage Site.

== Plaque ==
Prebends Bridge has a plaque to display Sir Walter Scott's words about Durham:

Grey towers of Durham,
Yet well I love thy mixed and massive piles
Half church of God, half castle ‘gainst the Scot
And long to roam these venerable aisles
With records stored of deeds long since forgot

— Extract from Harold the Dauntless, by Scott, published anonymously in 1817

== Gallery ==
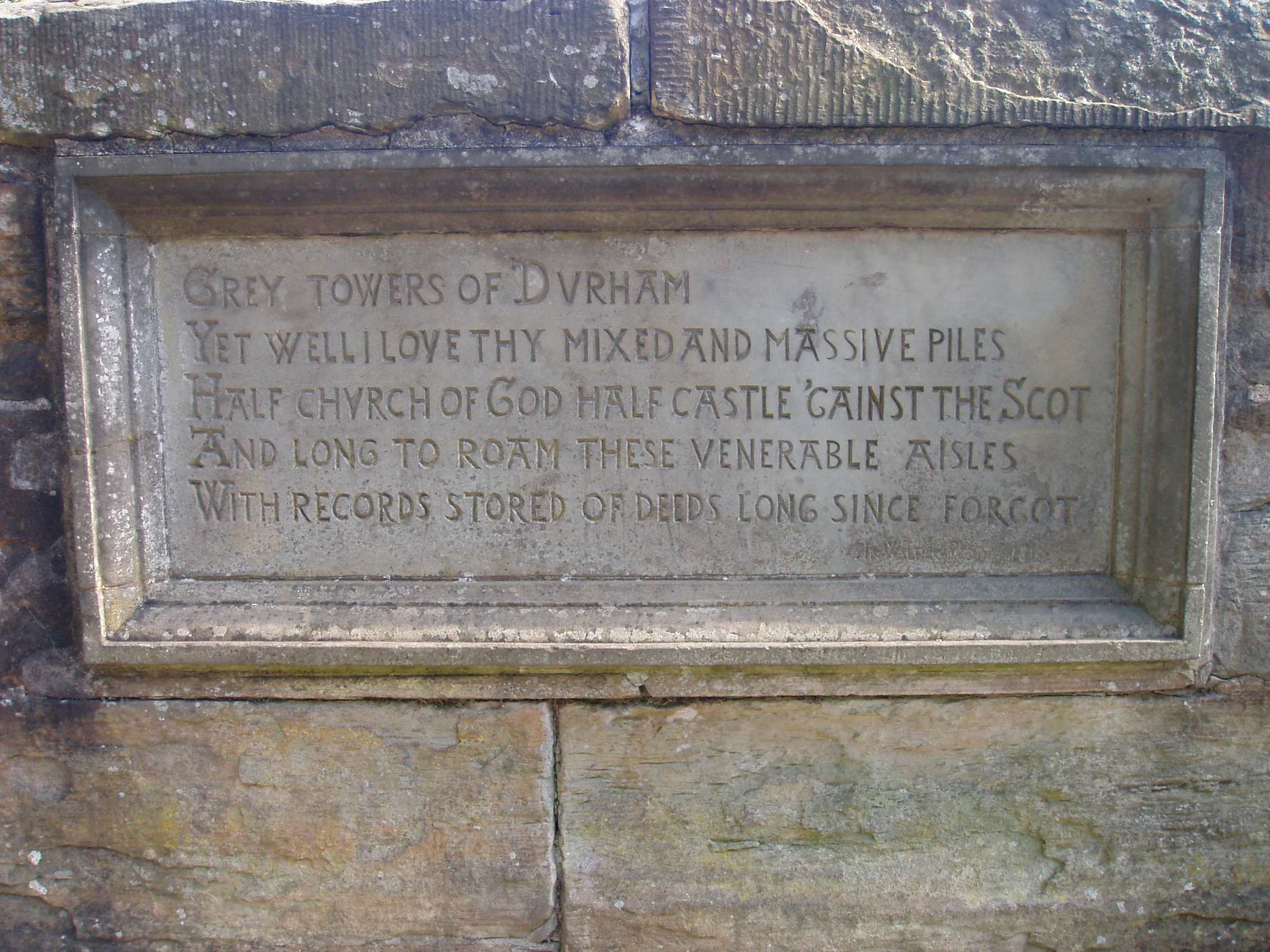
Inscription of Scott's words

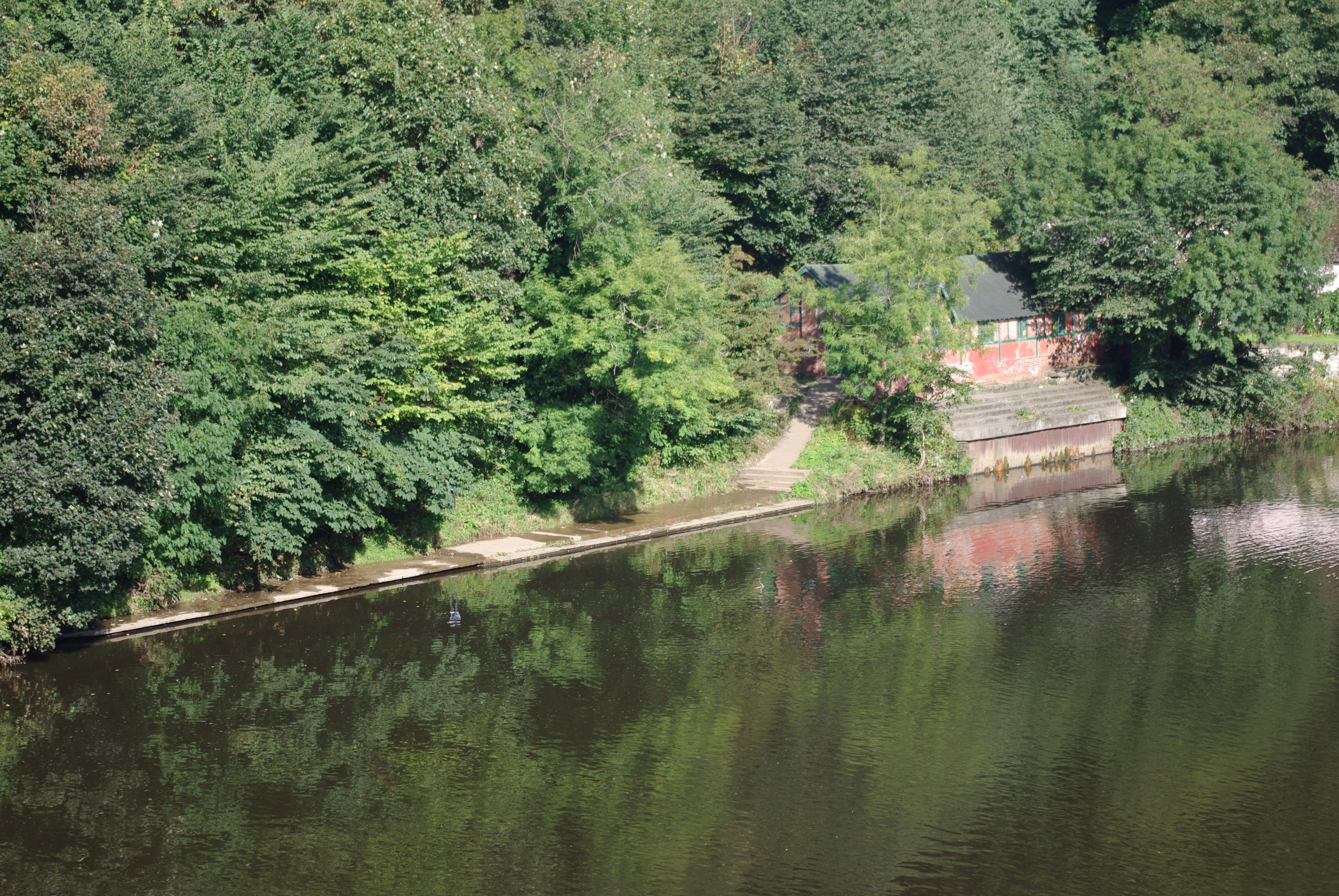
Durham School Boat Club's boat house as seen from the bridge

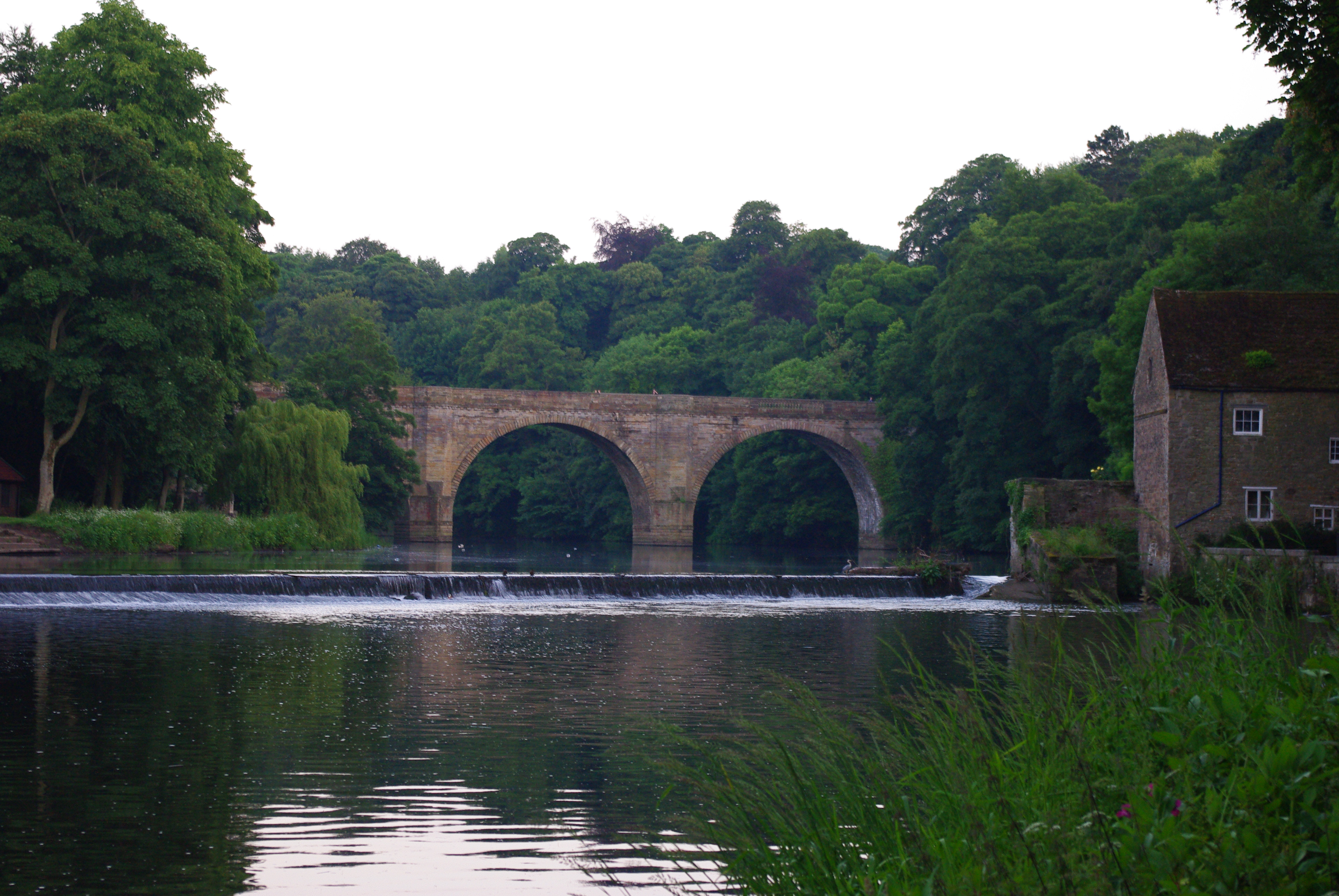
From downstream

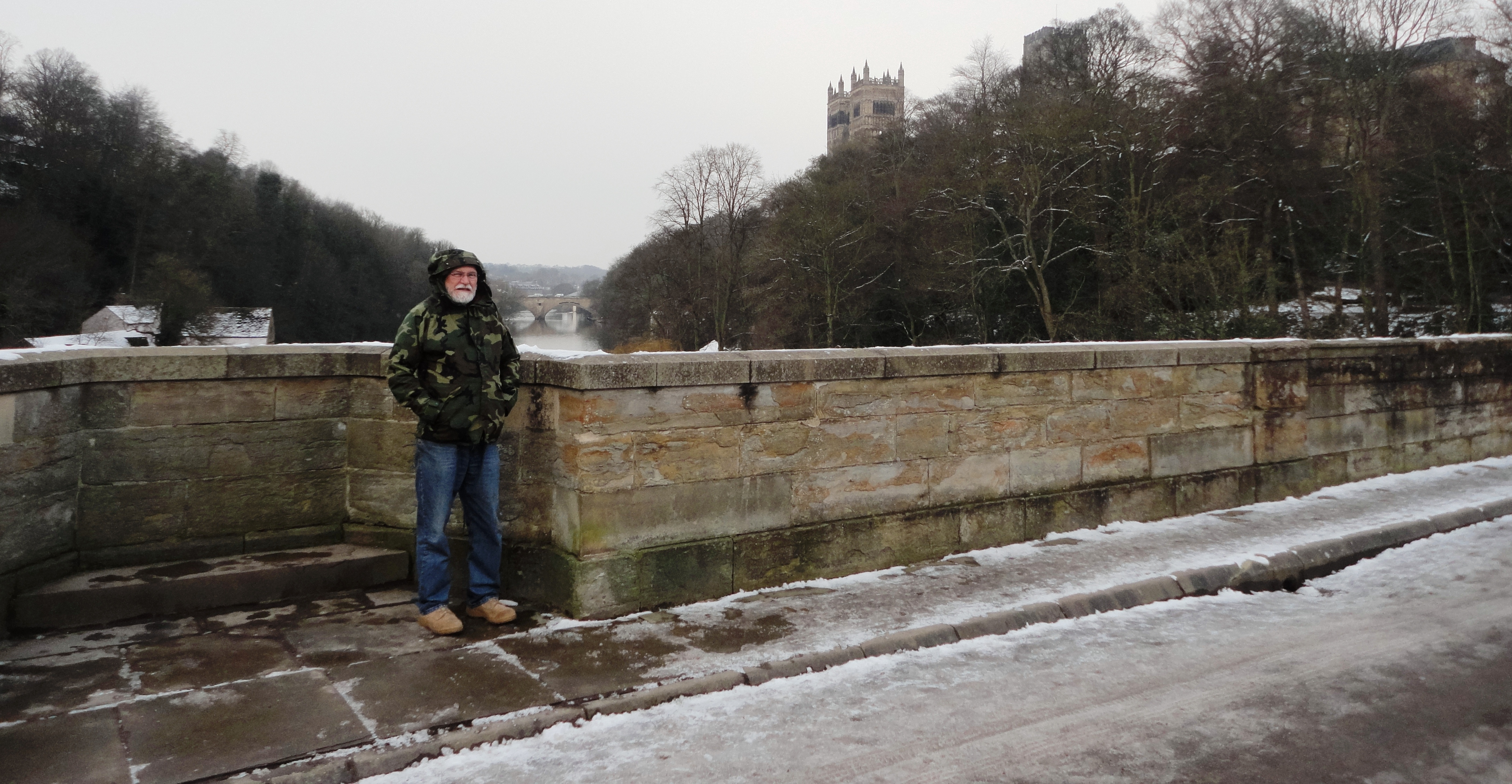
View from the north, note the lay-by (originally used as a meeting place for wide vehicular traffic) on the left.

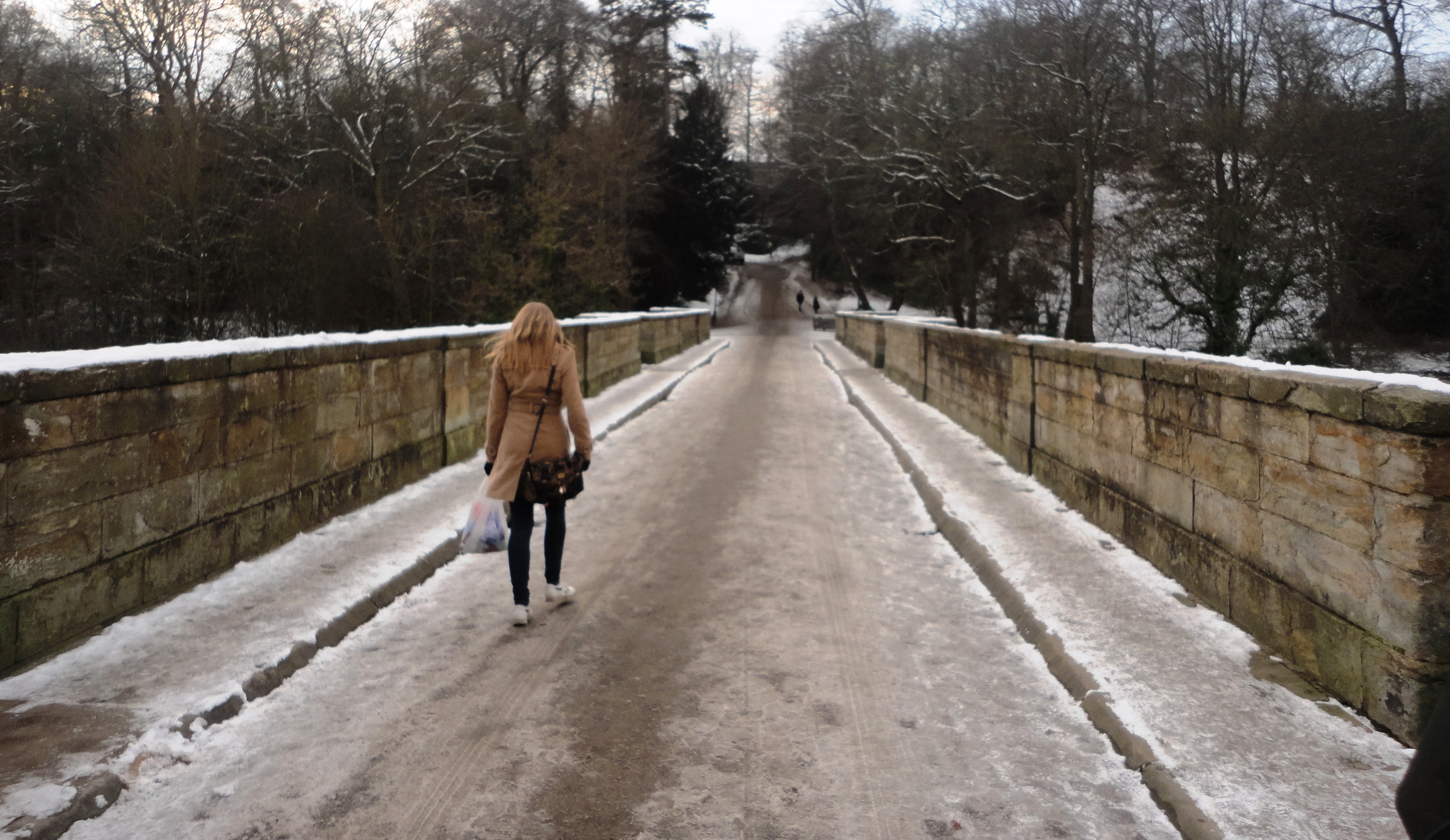
A pedestrian crosses Prebends Bridge in winter

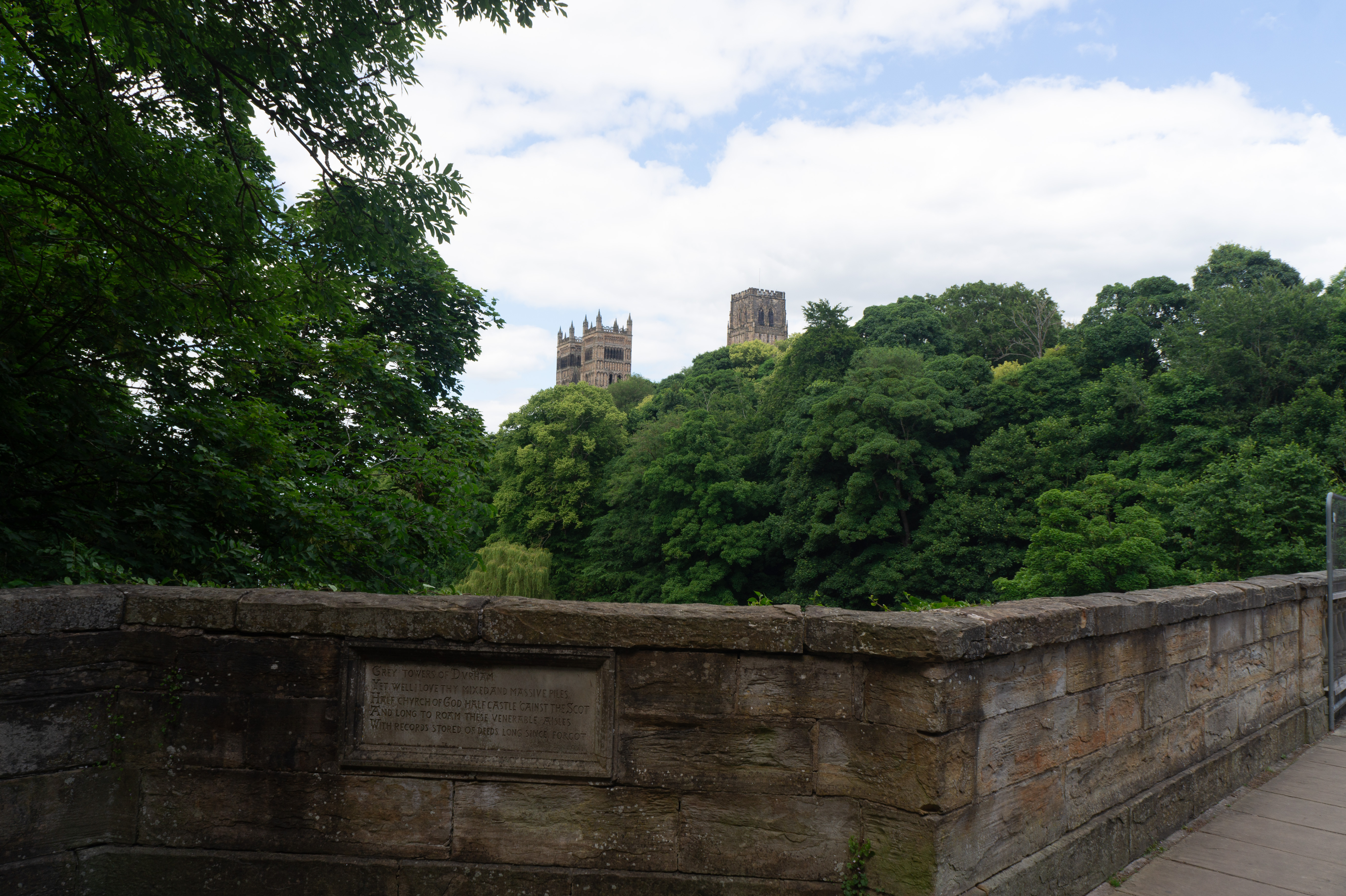
View of the Cathedral Towers from the western side of the bridge

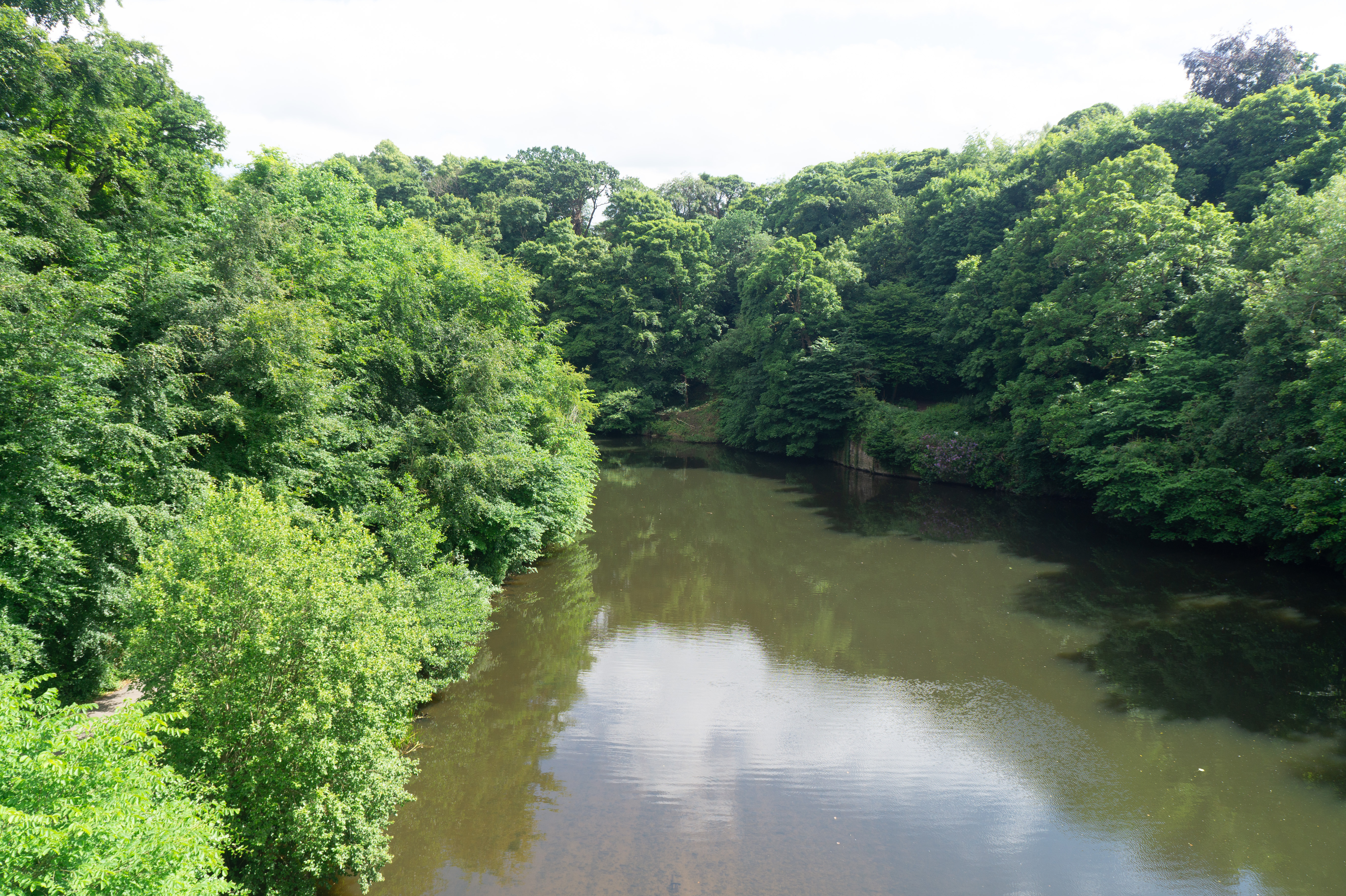
View from the bridge facing during summertime

View from the East end of the bridge

Next bridge upstream	River Wear	Next bridge downstream
Kingsgate Bridge	Prebends Bridge; Grid reference NZ2714541856	Framwellgate Bridge
