= Gear bearing =

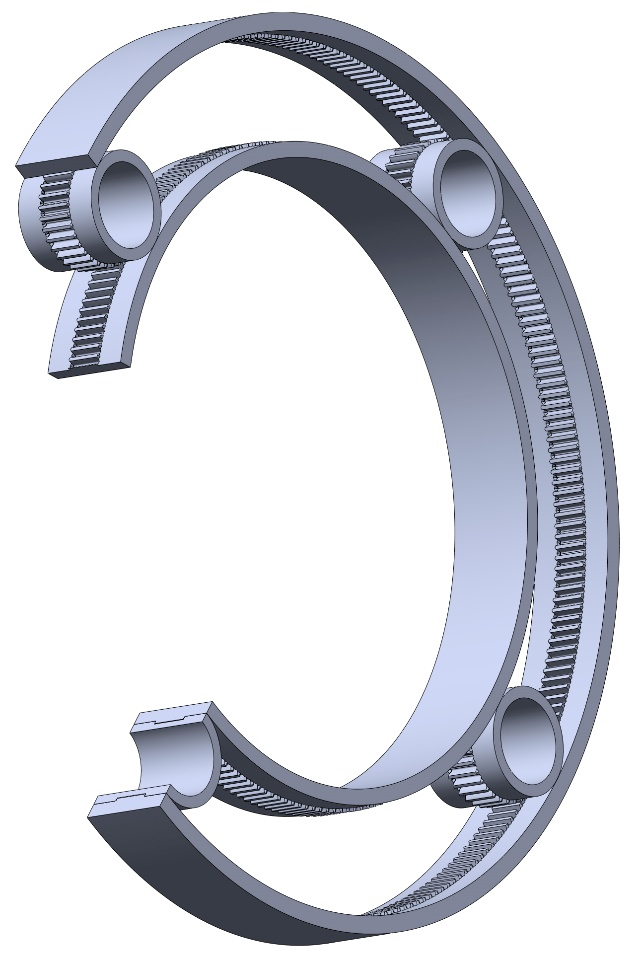
Gear bearing cutaway view

A gear bearing is a type of rolling-element bearing similar to epicyclic gearing. Gear bearings consist of a number of smaller 'satellite' gears which revolve around the center of the bearing along a track on the outsides of the internal and satellite gears, and on the inside of the external gear. Each gear is in between two concentric rings. Therefore, the widths of the satellite gears must all be the same.

== Engagement ==
Gear bearing

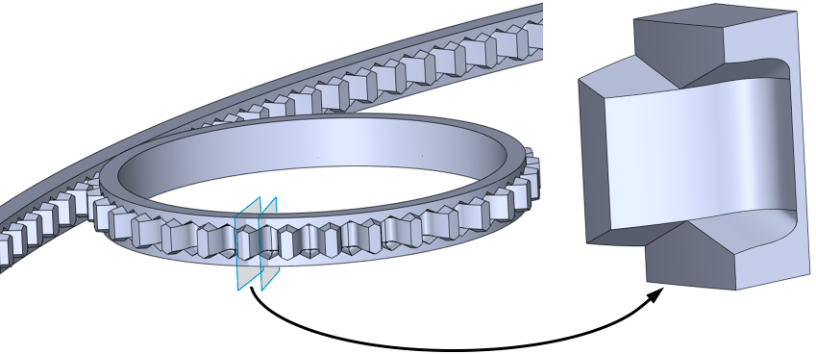
Skew teeth bearing gear

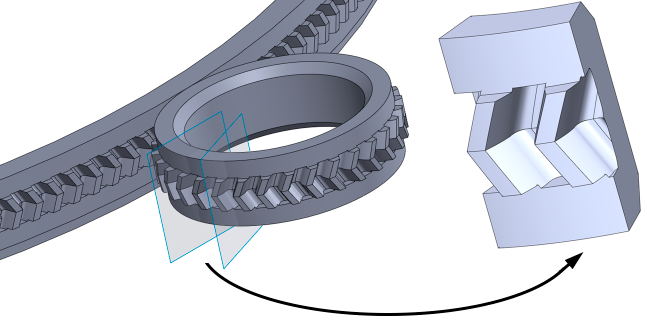
Herringbone bearing gear

In order for the surfaces to provide efficient axial meshing, the teeth must either be beveled or made with engagement. This avoids misalignment, sticking, and reduces sliding friction in the bearing. For instance, the illustrations present implementations of bearing gears with beveled teeth and rollers on their adjacent end faces as well as a herringbone engagement to provide minimal axial shift due to opposite sloping teeth.

== Work ==
Neglecting clearance and assuming perfect accuracy, the engagement of bearing gears is aimed at maximum rolling with minimum sliding friction of conjugated profiles in movement. End rollers limit the gears radial shift at their contact points so that when the gears are engaged, slip-free rolling motion of their conjugated pairs is achieved. Adjacent end faces of teeth and rollers limit the axial shift of conjugated bearing gears in plane-parallel motion. In such a way, using bearing gears as sun, ring and more than two satellites uniformly distributed among them the entire gear bearing is arranged, and carrier may be used instead of ring or sun gearwheels, or it may act as a frame unit and transfer rotation from the satellites, whereas limitation of carrier degrees of freedom would form redundant constraints or serve as an additional basis for force distribution in the mechanism. In case less than three bearing satellite gearwheels are involved, at least axles of movable sun and/or of ring bearing gearwheels should be fixed relative to housing parts.

== Usage ==
Gear bearings could be used as a more efficient bearing when used as a planetary gear arrangement with simplified kinematic relations and/or suspension. It also possible to use double row planetary gear combinations. In particular, systems of direct analog indications such as measuring instruments and planetary watches.

Linear gear bearings can easily be made with straight tracks. One, cast in bronze, is used as the expansion joint in the centre of Kingsgate Bridge.

== Implementations ==
The implementation of gear bearings may be one-piece manufacturing or a fixed joint assembly using: screws, bracers, threaded connections, pressure coupling, soldering, welding, gluing, or friction coupling in the form of sliding safety clutch or friction connection. The gear bearing may also be assembled from separate sectional parts or by joining with optional elastic and/or thermal deformation in the manufacturing sequence.

== Advantages and disadvantages ==
=== Advantages ===
- Simplicity of implementation (as bearing cages, carriers, simplified suspension, and mounting systems are not necessary)
- Increased efficiency due to decreased sliding friction losses
- May require fewer satellite gears, as their orbital motion is prescribed by gear engagement
- Possibility of use for direct visualization in measuring instruments

=== Disadvantages ===
- Anti-friction materials or coatings may be necessary because lubricants may be difficult to apply, especially in measuring instruments
- High standards of quality for manufacturing and assembling
