= Biddick Hall (house) =

18th-century mansion in Bournmoor, England

Coordinates: 54.8689°N 1.5114°W

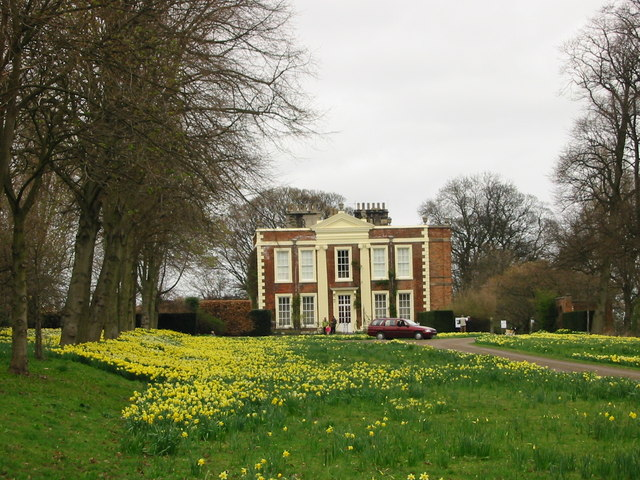
Biddick Hall in Spring

Biddick Hall is a small privately owned 18th-century country mansion at Bournmoor, County Durham, near the City of Sunderland and Chester-le-Street. It is a Grade I listed building and the home of the Lambton family.

== History ==
The Lambtons purchased the manor house and estate at South Biddick, then comprising about 450 acres (1.8 km^{2}), from the Bowes family in about 1594. In the early 18th century the old manor was replaced with the present red brick and stone, two-storeyed, five-bay mansion in a Queen Anne Baroque style. The central entrance bay has Ionic order pilasters carrying entablature and pediment.

In about 1820 John George Lambton built Lambton Castle to the west on the adjoining Harraton Hall estate. He was created Baron Lambton in 1828 and Earl of Durham in 1833.

The Hall was extended by the creation of a fifth but blind bay in 1859 and the addition of a north wing in 1954.

Following the family's move to Lambton Castle, Biddick was occupied by junior members of the family or was let out. In 1890 Hubert Richardson occupied the premises, but in 1893 he sold off the contents of the house and fled after he became aware that the police were seeking to arrest him for indecent offences with young men. Some of the offences were alleged to have taken place in Biddick Hall.

One of the tenants was Frank Stobart, Agent to the Earl, and Deputy Lieutenant and High Sheriff of Durham in 1906. In 1932, the castle being uninhabitable, the family once more made Biddick their home. It was remodelled by Trenwith Wills and Lord Gerald Wellesley.

In September 2012, Biddick Hall was used as part of the set of the new BBC One drama The Paradise. It was also used as a filming location for the 2015 movie Estranged. Shots of the exterior of Biddick Hall are frequently used throughout the film
