= St Mary's Church, Seaham =

The Parish Church of St Mary, Seaham
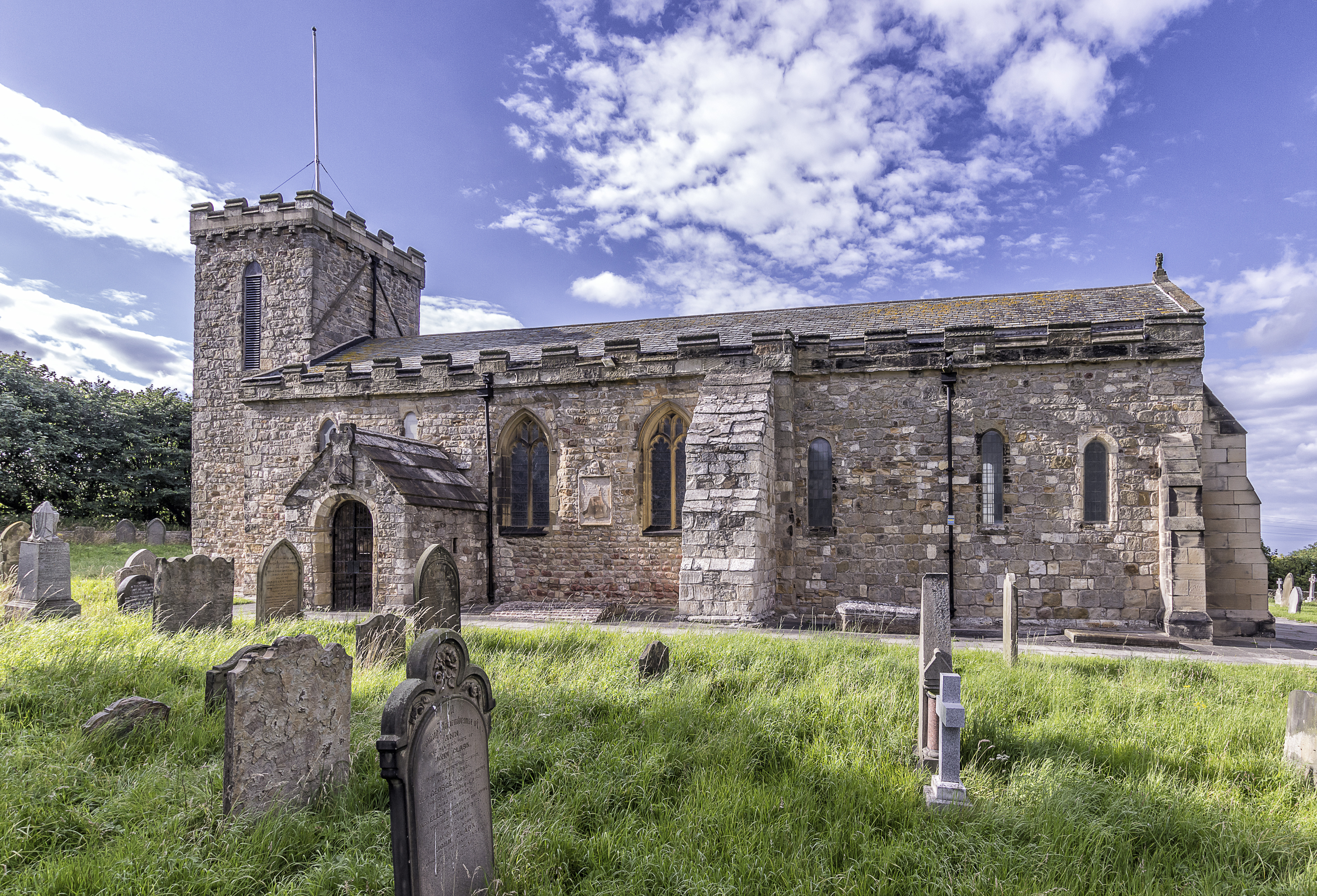
- The Parish Church of St Mary, Seaham
- OS grid reference: NZ 42243 50500
- Country: England
- Denomination: Church of England
- Website: stjohns-seaham.org.uk

History
- Dedication: St Mary

Architecture
- Functional status: Active
- Heritage designation: Grade I listed
- Designated: 21 June 1950
- Architectural type: Parish church
- Style: Saxon
- Completed: 7th or 8th century

Administration
- Province: Province of York
- Diocese: Diocese of Durham

St Mary's Church is an ancient parish church in Seaham, County Durham, England. It dates back to the 7th or 8th century, and is claimed to be one of the twenty oldest surviving churches in England. It is still regularly used for church services.

The church stands north of the modern town of Seaham, near the site of the original village.

The church was enlarged and altered between the 11th and 16th centuries. The tower was added in the mid 13th century. It was designated a Grade I listed building in 1950.
