= St Mary Magdalene Church, Hart =

Church in County Durham, England

St Mary Magdalene Church
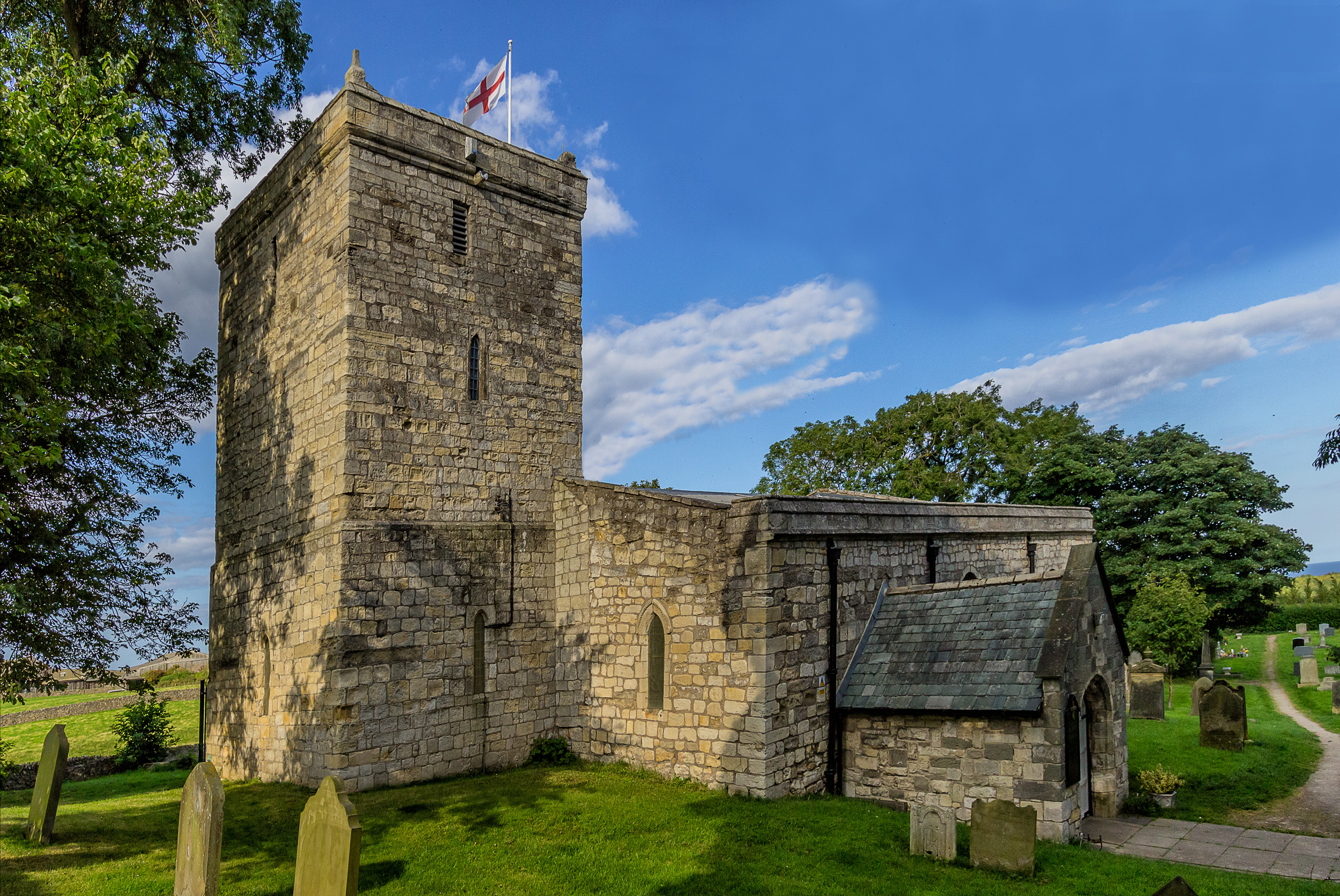
- St Mary Magdalene Church
- 54°42′32″N 1°16′17″W
- OS grid reference: NZ 47048 35107
- Country: England
- Denomination: Church of England

History
- Founded: 675 AD
- Dedication: Mary Magdalene

Architecture
- Architectural type: Anglo-Saxon

Administration
- Archdeaconry: Diocese of Durham

St Mary Magdalene Church is a Church of England parish church in the village of Hart, County Durham, England. It was founded in 675 AD and is the oldest church in Hartlepool. The church is a Grade I listed building, with the tower dating back to the 13th century and the nave being from the 12th.

== History ==
The existence of a church on the current site can be dated as far back as 675 AD and is thought to have been a wood structure that was later replaced with stone to include a chancel and aisle-less nave.
