= Gainford, County Durham =

Village in County Durham, England near River Tees

Coordinates: 54.54508°N 1.74163°W

Gainford
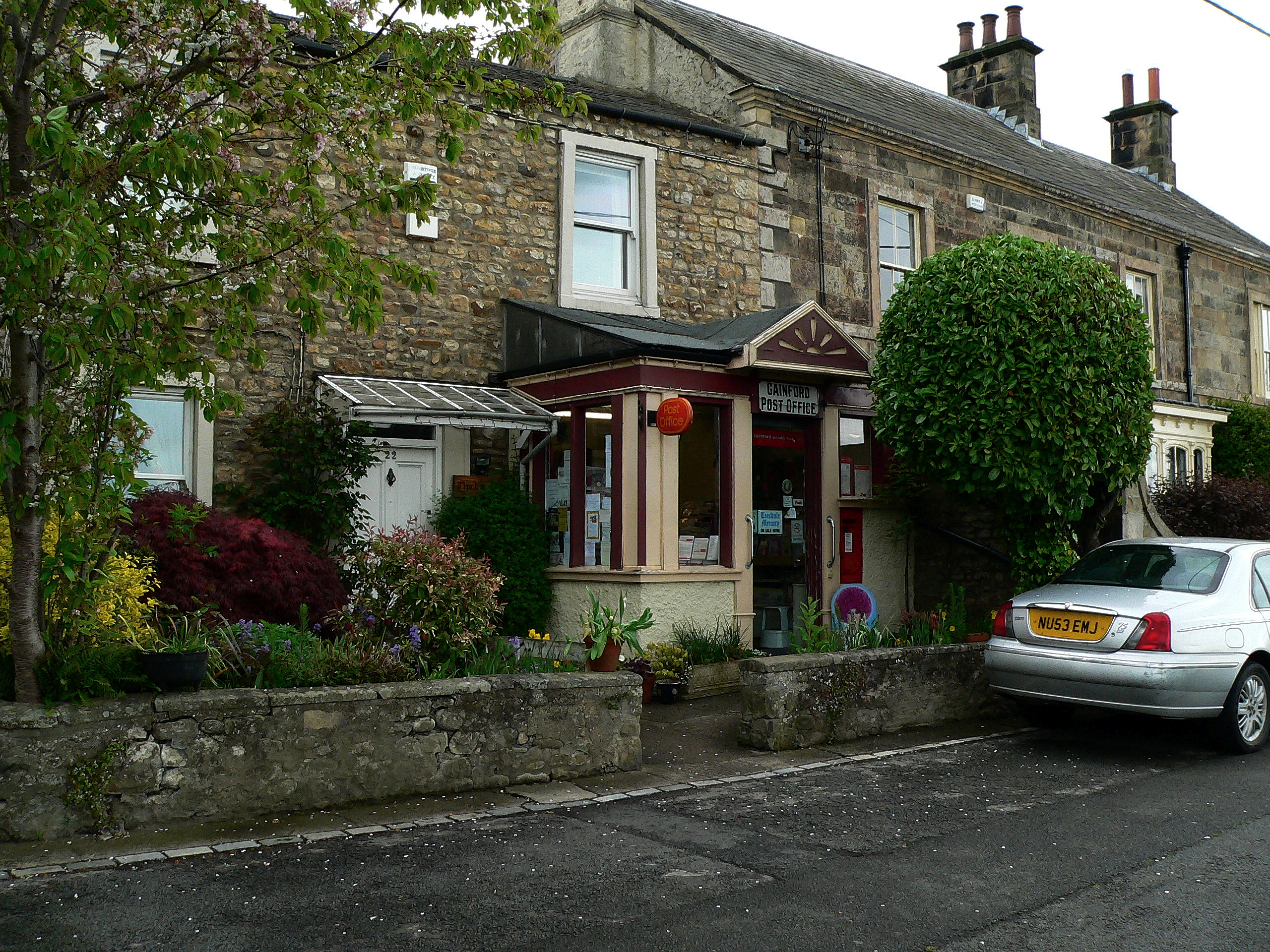
- Gainford Post Office

- Location within County Durham
- Population: 1,241 (including Denton, County Durham 2011)
- OS grid reference: NZ168166
- Unitary authority: County Durham
- Ceremonial county: County Durham
- Region: North East
- Country: England
- Sovereign state: United Kingdom
- Post town: Darlington
- Postcode district: DL2
- Police: Durham
- Fire: County Durham and Darlington
- Ambulance: North East
- UK Parliament: Bishop Auckland

Gainford or Gainford on Tees is a village on the north bank of the River Tees in County Durham, England. It is half-way between Barnard Castle and Darlington, near Winston, at OS map reference NZ 1716.

== History ==
In Anglo-Saxon times, Gainford was the centre of an estate, part of the Northumbrian Congregation of Cuthbert of Lindisfarne. Later, this area was occupied by Vikings. Archaeologists have found Viking sculptures at Gainford and several examples of these have been put on display in the Open Treasure exhibition at Durham Cathedral. Many sculptures found at Gainford show both Northumbrian and Viking influence. Despite the Viking settlement, Northumbrian Angles remained major landowners along the banks of the Tees in Viking times.

In the nineteenth century Gainford village had its own spa. Today its main features are an unspoilt village green, a Jacobean hall and a Georgian street called High Row. The village church of St Mary's, Gainford, stands on the site of an Anglo-Saxon monastery built by Bishop Ecgred of Lindisfarne in the early 9th century.

In 1904 the family of a deceased Joseph Edleston owned a plot of land next to the churchyard of St. Mary's in Gainford. The children asked to erect a monument in the churchyard in memory of Joseph's 41-year tenure at the church. The church refused permission, asserting that the churchyard was full, but that the family could donate their land to the church and then build a monument on part of it. Feeling slighted, the family immediately set about building themselves a house on their land with a 40-foot column erected next to the churchyard so it towered over the trees and pointed a huge V-sign in stone towards the church authorities. The Edleston Spite House is still standing and occupied and has MCMIV (1904) over the front door. While the 40-foot column is still standing, the 'V' sign is now gone.

== House styles ==
The houses around the green are mostly Georgian with some rubble-built houses on the north and south sides of the green. When they were built, the rubble-built houses would have been rendered, but the present fashion is to reveal the stonework with the rendering removed. Roofs are mostly red pantiles, and tend to be finished with a line of split-stone along the eaves. Some of the larger buildings have blue slate roofs, the slate probably brought by the railway. The older cottages in the village have steep pitched roofs in a style that suggests earlier heather thatching.

== Village cross ==
Towards the western end of the village green, there is a stone cross on a square base. The base is thought to be medieval in origin, but the cross itself is Victorian. It is dated 1897 and commemorates Queen Victoria's Diamond Jubilee. The Cross was made by Isaac Charge and Son, of Gainford. The cross has a slightly battered shaft and Saxon-type head. There is an inscription on the west face of the shaft which states: In thankful commemoration of the sixtieth anniversary of the accession of Queen Victoria on June 20th 1897. This cross was re-erected and trees planted on the green by the inhabitants of Gainford.

== Notable residents ==
The geographer Charles Bungay Fawcett (1883 – 1952), regarded as "one of the founders of modern British academic geography" and an early promoter of the idea of regional planning. was educated at the school in Gainford.

Images of Gainford
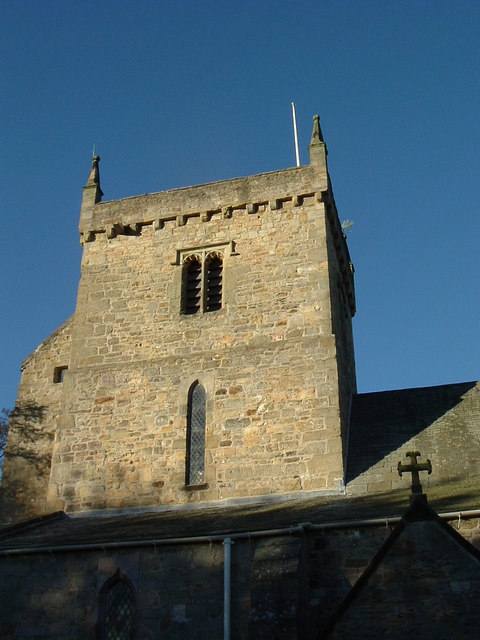
Church of St Mary

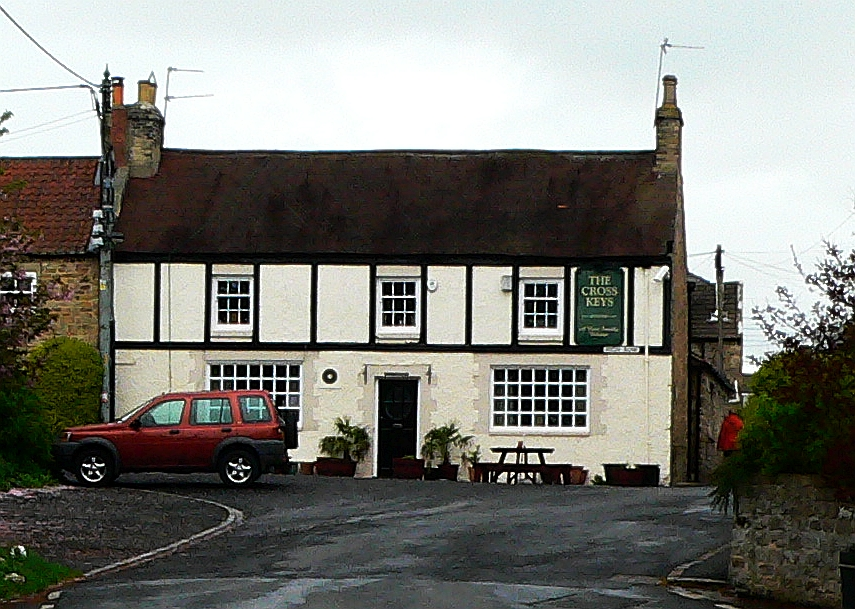
The Cross Keys Public House, Gainford

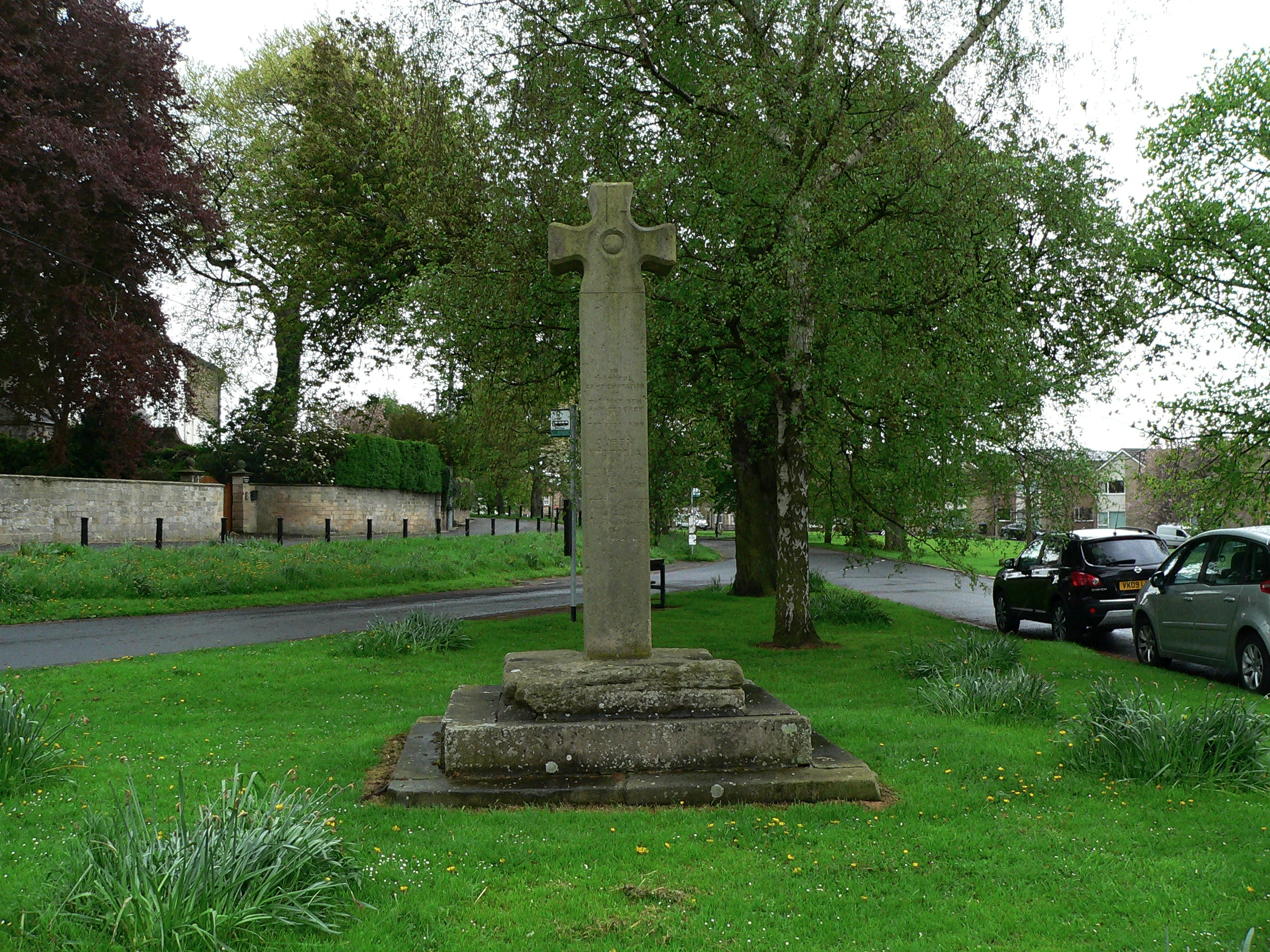
Commemorative village cross

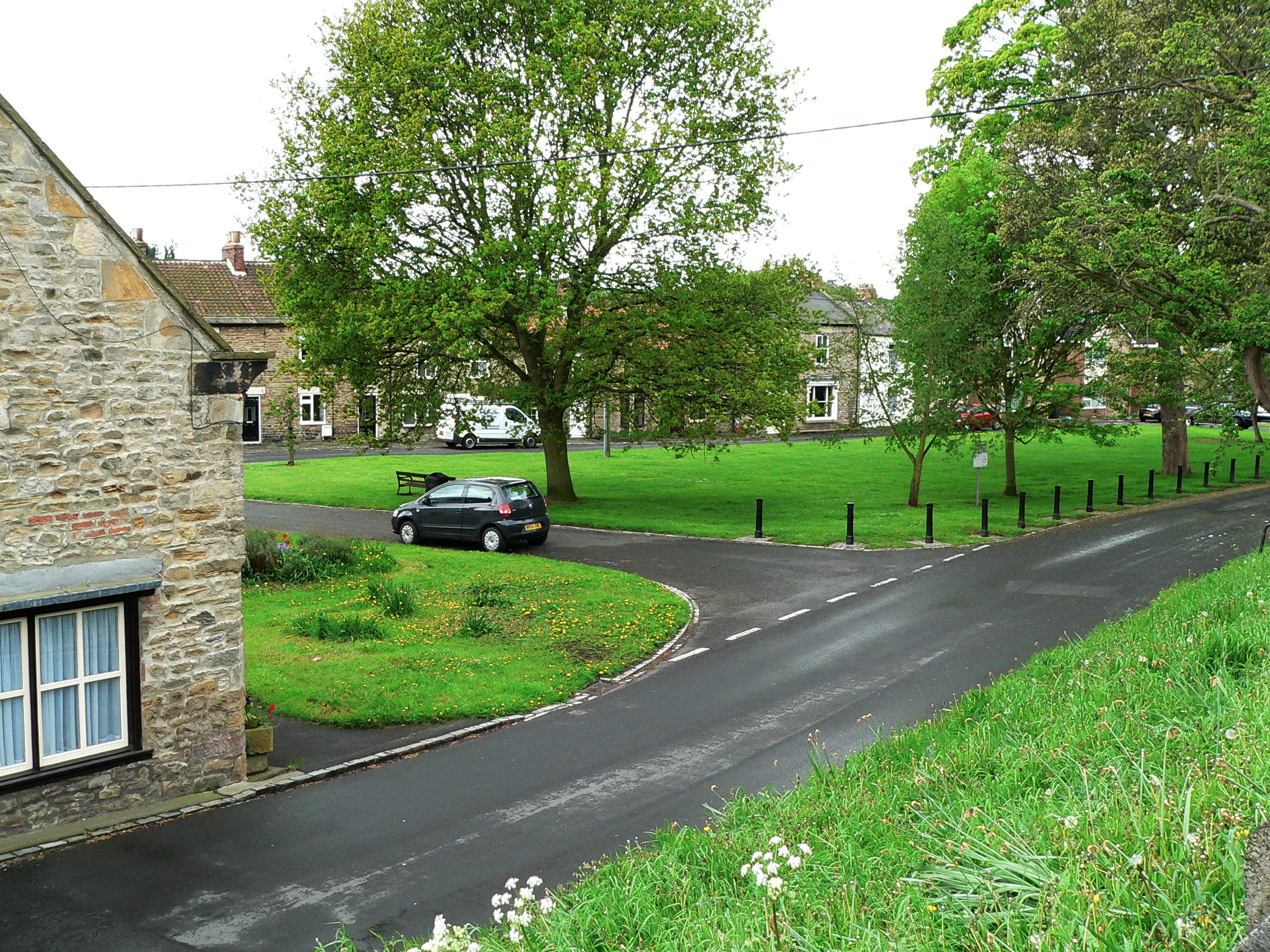
A view of the village Green
Images of Gainford
