= Kingsgate Bridge =

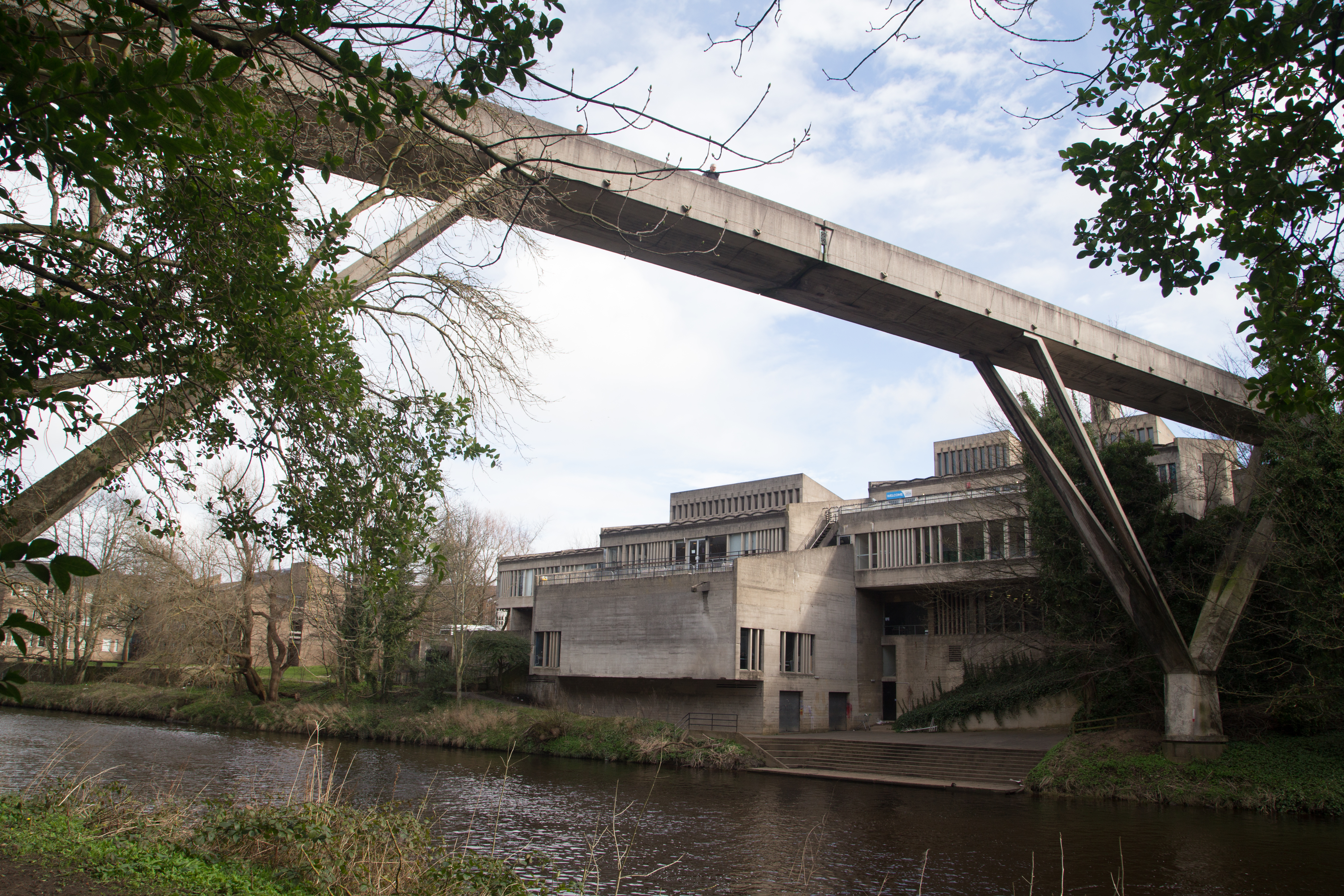
- Kingsgate bridge in front of Dunelm House
- Coordinates: 54.7731°N 1.5726°W
- OS grid reference: NZ275421
- Carries: Pedestrians
- Crosses: River Wear
- Locale: Co. Durham
- Owner: Durham County Council
- Heritage status: Grade I listed
- Preceded by: Elvet Bridge
- Followed by: Prebends Bridge

Characteristics
- Material: Reinforced concrete
- Longest span: 106.7 m (350 ft)

History
- Architect: Ove Arup
- Designer: Ove Arup
- Engineering design by: Ove Arup & Partners
- Construction end: 1963

Location
- Interactive map of Kingsgate Bridge

Kingsgate Bridge is a reinforced concrete construction footbridge across the River Wear, in Durham, England. It is a Grade I listed building. It was personally designed in 1963 by Ove Arup, the last structure he ever designed. Kingsgate Bridge connects Bow Lane on the peninsula in the centre of Durham to Dunelm House on New Elvet, which building Arup's studio also contributed, and opened in 1966. Kingsgate Bridge is thought to have been one of Arup's favourite designs of all: he had spent many hours working on every detail of the plans.

Its construction was unusual; the two halves were each built parallel to the river, then rotated through 90° to make the crossing. The meeting point of the two halves is marked by a simple bronze expansion joint using a linear gear bearing.

In 1965, the bridge was the winner of the Civic Trust Award.

In 1993, it won the Certificate of Outstanding Performance (Mature Structures Category) of the Concrete Society.

A bust of Arup, cast in resin, was installed on the side of Dunelm House, the students' union building adjacent to the bridge, in September 2011. The sculpture is a copy of a 1987 bust by Diana Brandenburger, held by the National Portrait Gallery. It is a replacement for a previous copy of the same bust, in bronze, which was unveiled by Karin Perry, Arup's daughter, on 16 April 2003, the 108th anniversary of Arup's birth, but which was stolen from its plinth during the summer of 2006.

In 2005, the bridge was adopted as a footpath by Durham County Council, making them responsible for its maintenance, although Durham University remain the owners.

During a university rag week in the late 1960s students suspended a car beneath the bridge.

== Gallery ==
Kingsgate Bridge
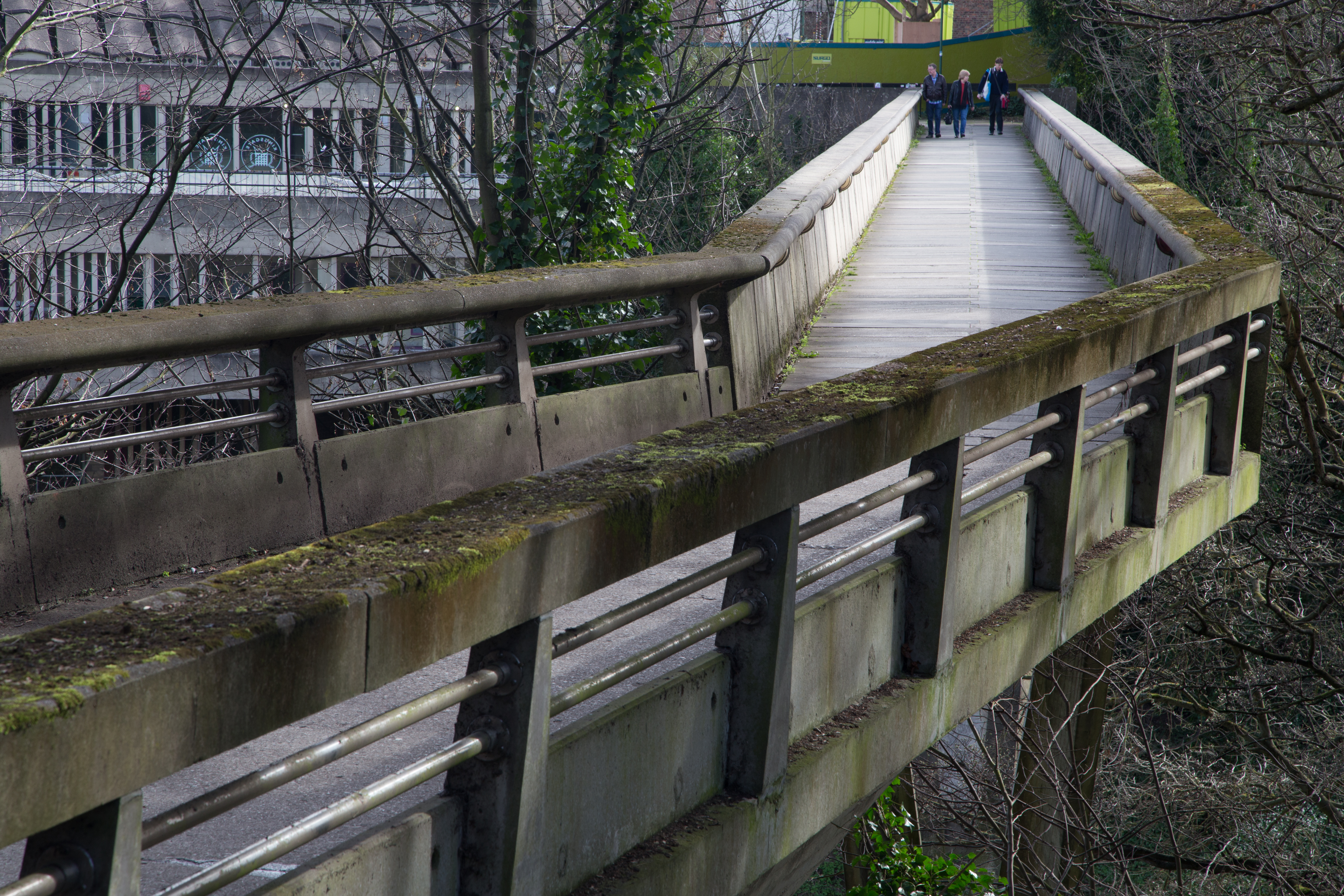
Kingsgate Bridge view from deck

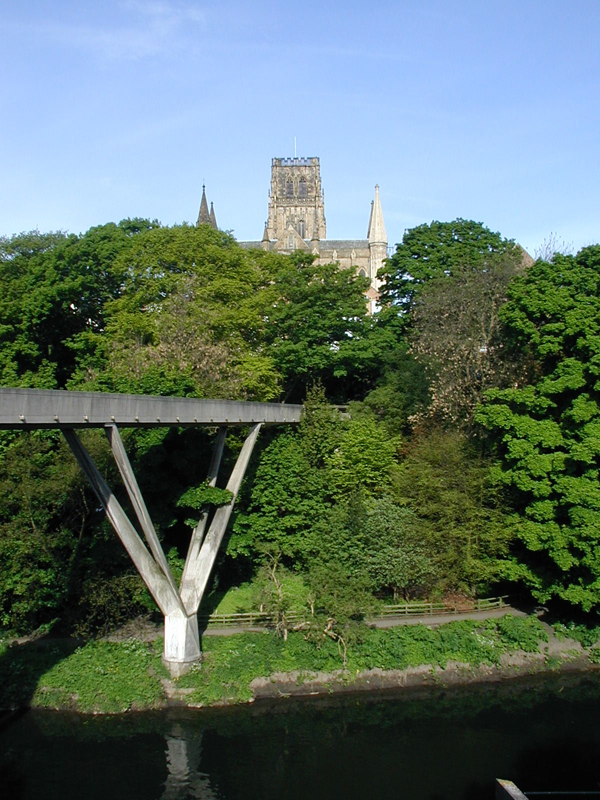
Kingsgate Bridge seen from Durham Students' Union, the Cathedral above

== See also ==
- List of Brutalist structures

Next bridge upstream	River Wear	Next bridge downstream
Elvet Bridge	Kingsgate Bridge; Grid reference NZ2759342106	Prebends Bridge
