= Gainford Hall =

Manor house in County Durham, England

Coordinates: 54.5467°N 1.7415°W

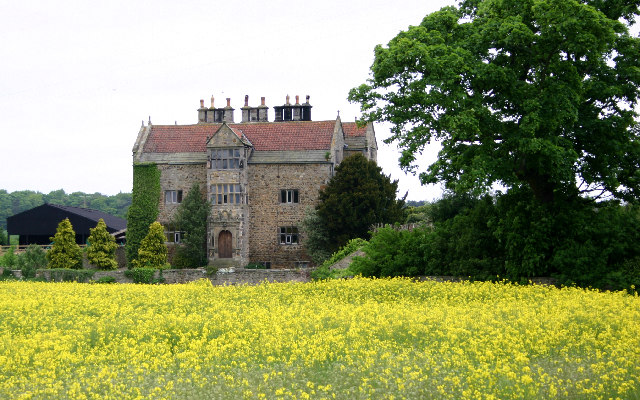
Gainford Hall

Gainford Hall is a privately owned Jacobean manor house at Gainford, County Durham. It is a Grade I listed building but as of 2014 is registered as a Building at Risk.

The house was built about 1603 to a design possibly by architect Robert Smythson for Rev John Cradock, Vicar of Gainford. The upper storey was never fully completed internally and the east wing staircase was not built. The property was much restored in the 19th century.

Cradock was appointed Archdeacon of Northumberland in 1604, and Chancellor to the Bishop of Durham in 1619. William Cradock bought an estate at Hartforth, near Richmond, Yorkshire in 1720 and thereafter junior members of the family lived at Gainford. Marmaduke Cradock died at the Hall at the age of 90 in 1836.

A 17th-century dovecote in the grounds is Grade II listed and also a Building at Risk.

The present owners Raby Estates have restored the old coach house and converted it to residential use.
