= Framwellgate Bridge =

Grade I listed bridge in County Durham, United Kingdom

- Framwellgate Bridge in 2026, with Durham Castle and Durham Cathedral behind it
- Coordinates: 54.7761°N 1.5781°W
- OS grid reference: NZ272424
- Carries: Pedestrians
- Crosses: River Wear
- Locale: City of Durham, County Durham, England
- Heritage status: Grade I listed
- Preceded by: Prebends Bridge
- Followed by: Milburngate Bridge

Characteristics
- Design: Two segmental arches with seven reinforcing ribs. Central pier with cutwaters. Possible third arch (no longer visible).
- Material: Stone
- Total length: 2 main spans total 30 yd (27 m)
- Width: 27 ft (8.2 m)
- No. of spans: 2 known; probably 3 total
- Piers in water: 1

History
- Construction start: After 1400
- Construction end: 15th century
- Replaces: Stone bridge built circa 1120

Location
- Interactive map of Framwellgate Bridge

Framwellgate Bridge is a medieval masonry arch bridge across the River Wear, in Durham, England. It is a Grade I listed building.

== History ==
The bridge was built after 1400 to replace one built early in the 12th century for Ranulf Flambard, who was Bishop of Durham 1099–1128. Flambard's bridge seems to have had five or six arches. A record of a lawsuit in 1437 records that Flambard's bridge:

...was broken by a flood during the Festival of the Nativity of the Blessed Virgin Mary in 1400.

Until the replacement bridge was completed a ferry was substituted, the profit from which was shared between the Bishop of Durham and the Prior of Durham Cathedral Priory.

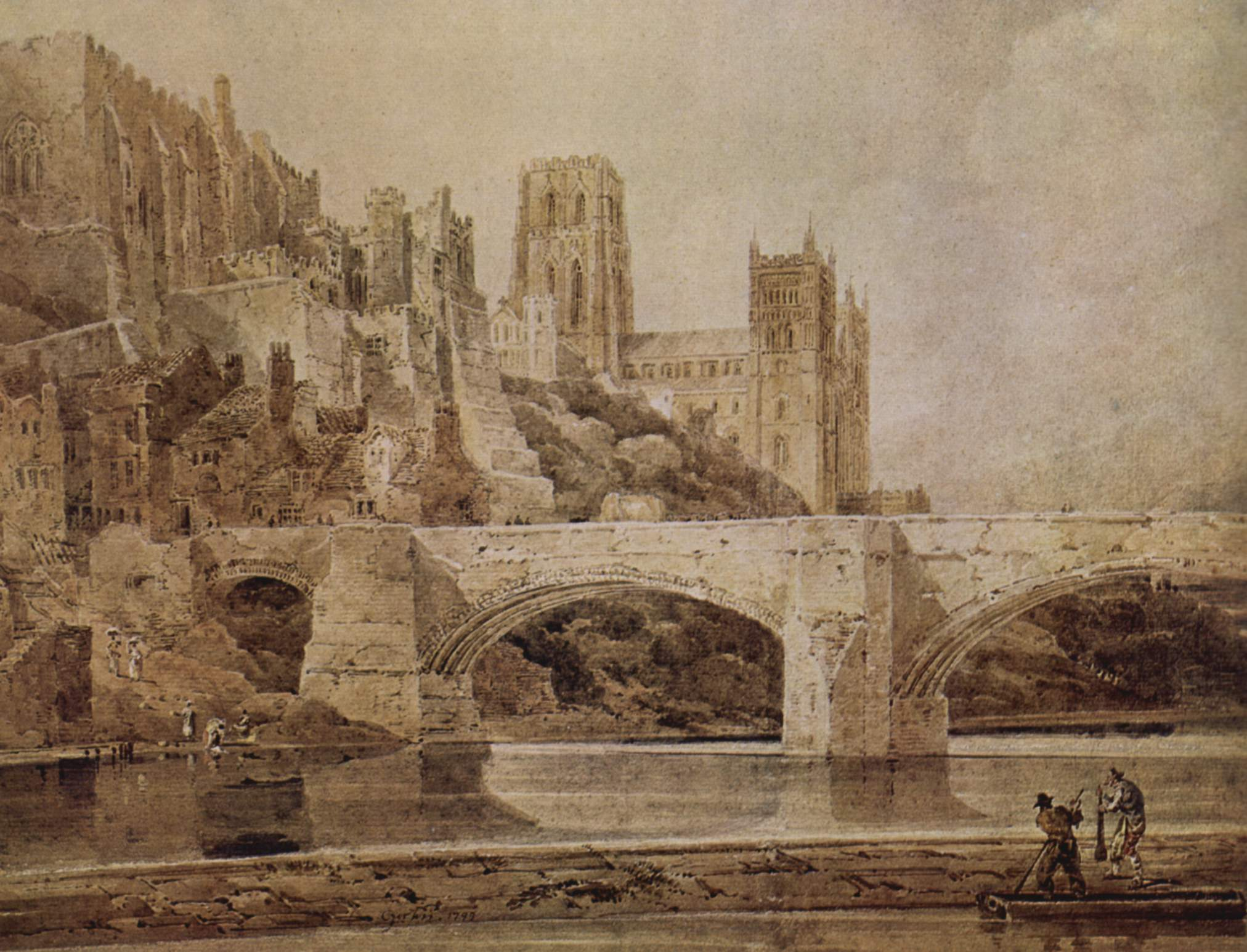
1799 watercolour by Thomas Girtin of Durham Cathedral and the River Wear, showing all three arches of Framwellgate Bridge

People walking on Framwellgate Bridge in 2026

The current bridge is of two shallow arches, each with several reinforcing ribs. Their combined span is about 30 yards (27 m). The early 16th-century antiquary John Leland recorded that there were three arches. A watercolour of Durham Cathedral painted by Thomas Girtin in 1799 shows a third arch, with a rounded shape characteristic of Norman architecture. Buildings at the central Durham end of the bridge may conceal the third arch, which may be a surviving part of Flambard's original 12th-century bridge.

Some sources indicate that both ends of the bridge were fortified by towers and gates, though others infer only a single gatehouse was built on the peninsula side of the river. The gateway and tower at the eastern end of the bridge were deemed an obstruction to traffic and demolished in 1760. A flood destroyed two houses at the end of the bridge in 1771. Early in the 19th century the bridge was widened on its upstream side. It is now 27 feet (8.2 m) wide. Of the reinforcing ribs under each arch, five belong to the 15th-century bridge and two to the 19th-century widening.

In 1318, Robert Neville, the "Peacock of the North", murdered his cousin, the Bishop's Steward, Sir Richard Fitzmarmaduke, at Framwellgate Bridge.

Until the building of Milburngate Bridge in 1969, Framwellgate Bridge was the main traffic route from the west through the centre of Durham. Today, the bridge is pedestrianised.

Next bridge upstream	River Wear	Next bridge downstream
Prebends Bridge	Framwellgate Bridge; Grid reference NZ2723742431	Milburngate Bridge; A690 road

== Sources ==
- Jervoise, Edwyn (1931). The Ancient Bridges of the North of England. Vol. II. Westminster: The Architectural Press for the SPAB. pp. 40, 43–44.
