= Hilton, North Yorkshire =

Village and civil parish in North Yorkshire, England

Coordinates: 54°29′48″N 1°17′00″W

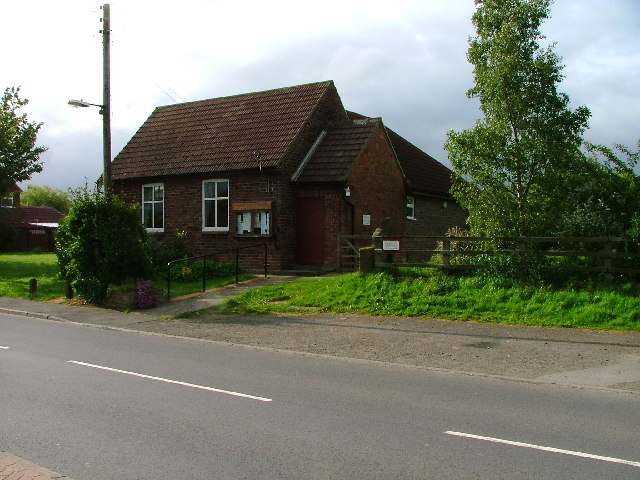
Hilton's village hall, refurbished and extended at the turn of the millennium

Hilton is a village and civil parish in the borough of Stockton-on-Tees and the ceremonial county of North Yorkshire, England. It is a small village with an estimated population of around 400, measured at 374 in the 2011 census. Despite its proximity to Teesside, the village retains its rural feel, and has a number of public footpaths surrounding it.

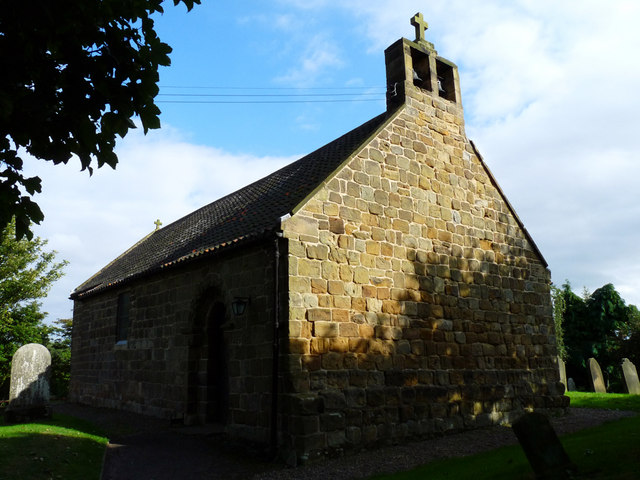
12th century Church of St Peter

The village church, the Church of St Peter, Hilton, which is largely unaltered since its building in the 12th century, is a Grade I listed building. The old Hilton Manor House was demolished in the 1960s and the site is now occupied by a number of houses along Manor Drive. Until the 1960s the village consisted of only around a dozen properties plus a few farms, but several small-scale housing developments in the 1970s and 1990s have seen the size of the village increase dramatically. The village has no shop, but has retained its pub, The Falcon (formerly The Fox & Hounds). At the turn of the Millennium, Hilton's village hall was refurbished and extended.

== Demographics ==
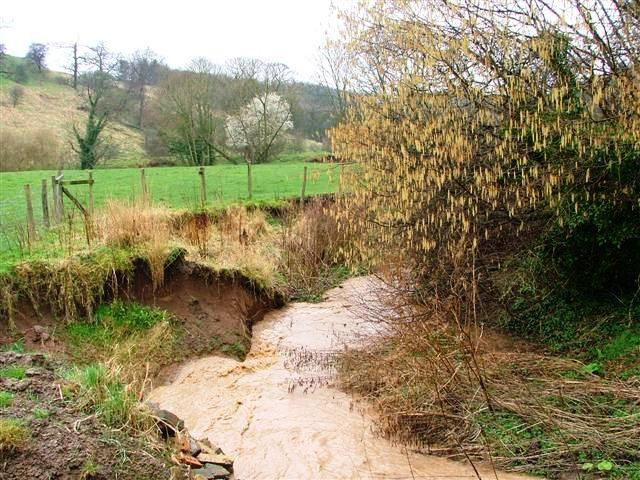
Brewsdale Beck, south of the village
