= Church of St Peter, Hilton =

Church of St Peter
- Church of Saint Peter, Hilton
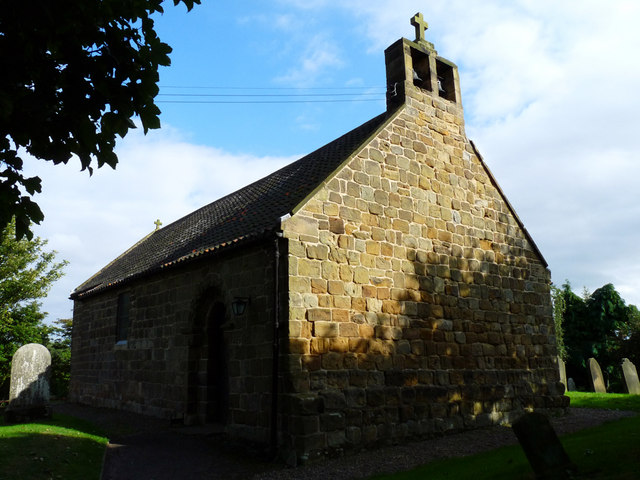
- St Peter's Church
- Church of St Peter
- 54°29′42″N 1°16′57″W
- OS grid reference: NZ 46568 11314
- Address: Church Lane, Hilton, Yarm, North Yorkshire, TS15 9LB
- Country: England
- Denomination: Church of England

History
- Status: Grade II* listed building

Architecture
- Architectural type: Parish church
- Style: Norman

Specifications
- Materials: Sandstone ashlar, clay pantile roof

Administration
- Diocese: Diocese of York
- Parish: Stainton with Hemlington and Hilton

Listed Building – Grade I
- Official name: Church of St Peter, Seamer Road
- Designated: 23 June 1966
- Reference no.: 1139229

The Church of St Peter is an active Church of England parish church located in the village of Hilton, near Yarm in North Yorkshire, England. Constructed in the 12th century, the building is a small, substantially intact example of Norman architecture. It was designated a Grade I listed building on 23 June 1966.

== History ==
=== Medieval origins ===
The church was constructed during the 12th century as a chapel of ease serving the manor of Hilton within the ancient parish of Rudby-in-Cleveland. The advowson and chapel were granted to the Augustinian Gisborough Priory in the late 12th century by the Meinell family, lords of the manor.

Following the Dissolution of the Monasteries under Henry VIII, the rectory and patronage passed into secular hands, eventually becoming an independent parish.

=== Restoration and 19th-century alterations ===
Unlike many regional parish churches, St Peter's avoided major structural rebuilding during the Victorian era, preserving its early medieval footprint and low nave profile. Minor restorations occurred in the late 19th and early 20th centuries, including repairs to the timber roof structure and the installation of a bellcote on the west gable.

In 1888, the building underwent a sensitive restoration directed by the Middlesbrough architect C. J. Adams. The work included repairing the timber roof, laying clay pantiles, and opening up previously blocked 12th-century window openings in the nave.

The church remains an active place of worship within the benefice of Stainton with Hemlington and Hilton in the Diocese of York.

== Architecture and interior ==
=== Exterior ===
St Peter's is built from coursed sandstone ashlar with a clay pantile roof. The building comprises a simple rectangular plan combining the nave and chancel under a single roofline, terminated on the west gable by a stone bellcote housing a single bell.

The south doorway dates from the 12th century and features a round arch with plain chamfered orders and carved capitals. Along the south wall of the nave, a 12th-century corbel table survives, decorated with carved human faces and grotesque figures.

=== Interior and fittings ===
The interior is dominated by a narrow 12th-century Norman chancel arch featuring plain jambs, moulded imposts, and a semi-circular arch with a roll moulding.

Additional interior fittings include:

- A stone font dating to the 12th century, consisting of a simple circular bowl mounted on a modern cylindrical base.
- Box pews and timber communion rails dating from the 18th and early 19th centuries.
- Mural tablets on the chancel walls commemorating members of the Hayton and Lowther families.
