= Elvet Bridge =

Medieval bridge in County Durham, England

- Coordinates: 54.775946°N 1.573330°W
- Crosses: River Wear
- Locale: City of Durham, County Durham, England
- Heritage status: Grade I listed building

Characteristics
- Design: Pointed arches with reinforcing ribs. Piers with cutwaters.
- Material: Stone
- Width: 33 feet (10 m)
- No. of spans: 10 known; possibly 14 total
- Piers in water: 3

History
- Construction start: 1160
- Construction end: 13th century

Location
- Interactive map of Elvet Bridge

Elvet Bridge is a medieval masonry arch bridge across the River Wear in the city of Durham, in County Durham, England. It links the peninsula in central Durham and the Elvet area of the city, and is a Grade I listed building.

== Building ==
Building of the bridge began in AD 1160 in the time of Bishop Hugh de Puiset (1153–95). De Puiset, also known as "Bishop Pudsey", was a powerful Prince Bishop who instigated a significant amount of building work in northern England. A key reason for building the bridge was the urban development taking place in what was the then Elvet borough. The bridge took many years to complete: in 1225 and 1228 indulgences were still being granted to people who contributed to "the building of the new bridge at Elvet". Of the current arches only one is late 12th century; the remainder are 13th century.

Elvet bridge was not Durham's first bridge over the Wear. The Foedarium of Durham Cathedral Priory, compiled early in the 15th century, records:

Bishop Hugo built the bridge of Elvit, called the New Bridge to distinguish it from the other bridge, already built, which is called the Old Bridge.

The bridge has 10 visible arches, but there is some dispute over how many arches exist in total. The early 16th-century antiquary John Leland believed there were 14 arches, but this has never been proven. The river flows through four full arches – the remaining are dry or partly so. The early 19th-century antiquary Robert Surtees wrote that there were 10 arches, and this number has been verified. Others may be hidden beneath the street on the Elvet side or beneath Souter Peth.

== Subsequent history ==
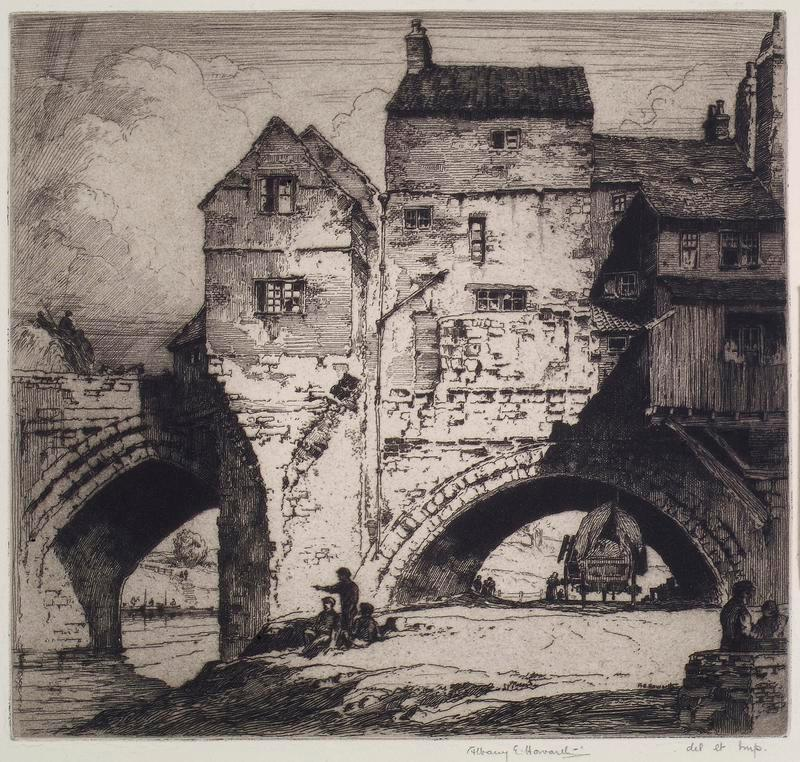
Albany E. Howarth (1872 - 1936) - Elvet Bridge, Durham - ABDAG006323 - Aberdeen City Council (Archives, Gallery and Museums Collection)

The bridge was repaired extensively in the time of Bishop Foxe between 1495 and 1501, and again in 1601. A flood in 1771 badly damaged the bridge and the three central arches were renewed. The bridge was 15 feet (4.6 m) wide until 1804–05, when it was widened by 18 feet (5.5 m) on its upstream (northern) side.

Buildings on the bridge at western end

In the Middle Ages Elvet Bridge was guarded by a gate and towers, and there was a number of buildings on the bridge. They included a chapel at either end: St James' at the western end and St Andrew's on a pier at the eastern end. St Andrew's may have been the larger of the two, as an inventory compiled in 1549 in the Edwardine Reformation measured the lead on their roofs as 36 square yards (30 m^{2}) at St James' but 88 square yards (74 m^{2}) at St Andrew's. St James' chapel was replaced with a House of Correction (prison) in 1632. In the 18th century the House of Correction and many buildings at the north end of the bridge were demolished.

The chapel on the eastern, Elvet, side of the bridge has partially survived and is particularly visible from the riverbanks to the south. A number of buildings incorporate part of the bridge, and 18 Elvet Bridge is also Grade I listed as a result.

The bridge is reputed to be the narrowest row-through bridge in Europe.

Next bridge upstream	River Wear	Next bridge downstream
New Elvet Bridge	Elvet Bridge; Grid reference NZ2753642424	Kingsgate Bridge

== Sources ==
- Jervoise, Edwyn (1931). The Ancient Bridges of the North of England. Vol. II. Westminster: The Architectural Press for the SPAB. pp. 40–43.
- Johnson, Margot (2004). Durham: Historic and University City. Jarrold Publishing. ISBN 0-946105-16-2.
- Simpson, David (2006). Durham City. Business Education. ISBN 978-1-901888-50-8.
