= Hatfield College, Durham =

Constituent college of Durham University

Hatfield College
- Durham University
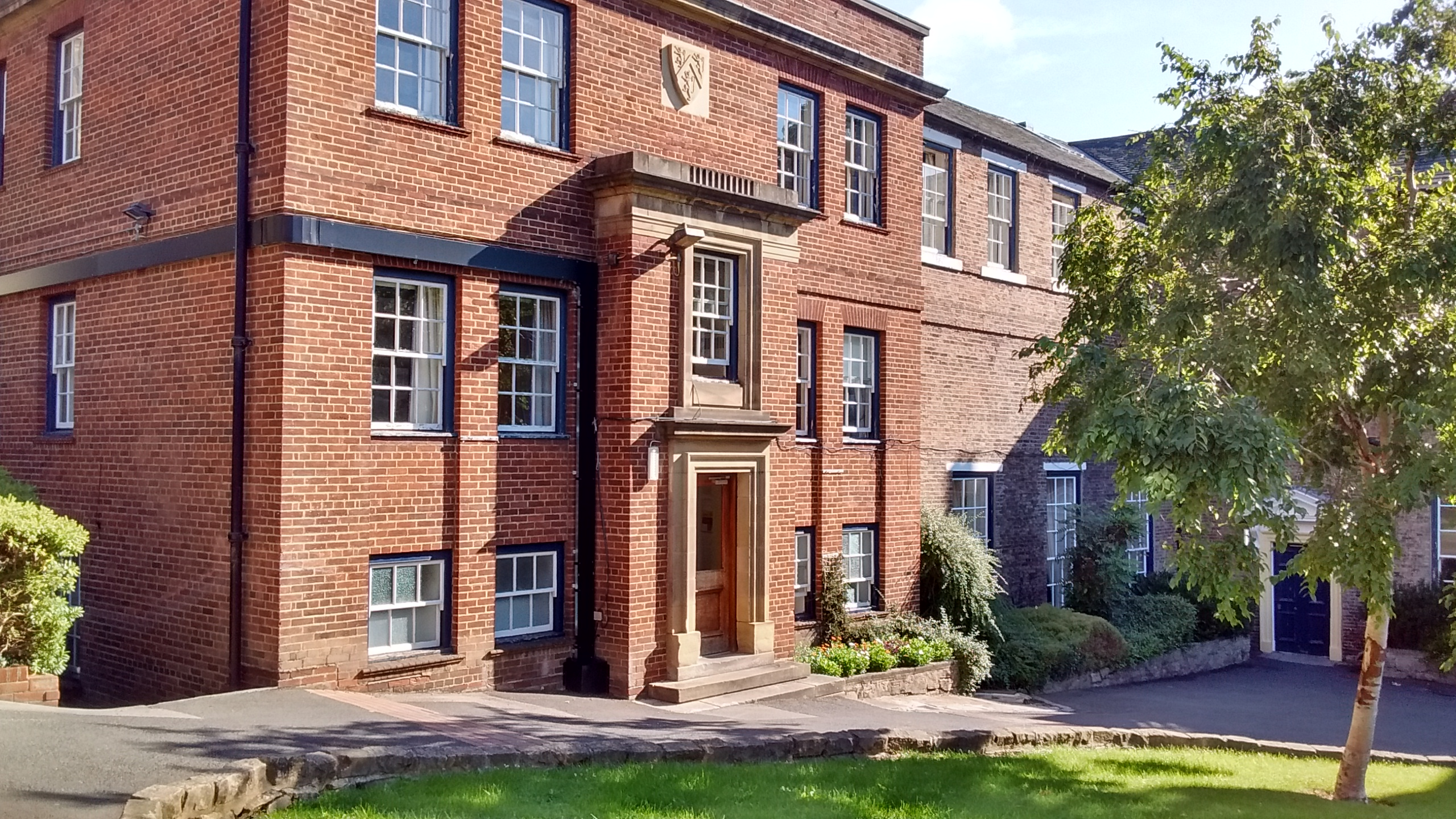

- Arms of Hatfield College; Arms: Azure a Chevron Or between three Lions rampant Argent a Bordure Ermine
- Location: North Bailey, Durham, DH1 3RQ
- Coordinates: 54.7744°N 1.5741°W
- Latin name: Collegium Hatfeldiensis
- Motto: Latin: Vel Primus Vel Cum Primis
- Motto in English: Either the first or with the first
- Established: 1846; 180 years ago
- Named after: Thomas Hatfield
- Former names: Bishop Hatfield's Hall
- Master: Ann MacLarnon (2017–)
- Chaplain: The Rev. Dr Julia Candy
- Undergraduates: 1010 (2017/18)
- Postgraduates: 260 (2017/18)
- Website: dur.ac.uk/hatfield.college/

Map
- Location within Durham, England

UNESCO World Heritage Site
- Part of: Durham Castle and Cathedral
- Criteria: Cultural: ii, iv, vi
- Reference: 370
- Inscription: 1986 (10th Session)

Hatfield College is one of the constituent colleges of Durham University in England. It occupies a city centre site above the River Wear on the World Heritage Site peninsula, lying adjacent to North Bailey and only a short distance from Durham Cathedral. Taking its name from Thomas Hatfield, a medieval Prince-Bishop of Durham, the college was founded in 1846 as Bishop Hatfield's Hall by David Melville, a former Oxford don.

Melville disliked the 'rich living' of patrician undergraduates at University College, and hoped to nurture a collegiate experience that would be affordable to those of limited means; and in which the students and staff were to be regarded as part of a single community. In line with his ambitions, the college pioneered the concept of catered residences for students, where all meals were taken in the hall, and occupants charged fixed prices for board and lodgings. This system became the norm for Durham colleges, and later at Oxford and Cambridge, before spreading worldwide.

College architecture is an eclectic blend of buildings from a variety of styles and periods. The sloping main courtyard contains an eighteenth-century dining hall, the restrained Jacobethan Melville Building (designed by Anthony Salvin), a Victorian Gothic chapel, and the 'inoffensive neo-Georgian' C Stairs. The trend for revivalist and traditional buildings was disposed of with the modern Jevons Building, located in the college's second courtyard, which interprets older forms in a more 'contemporary' manner.

As the 20th century progressed, Hatfield was increasingly defined by its sporting achievements, especially in rugby. College staff preferred to highlight the eagerness of students to get involved in a wide range of university activities, and noted that 'Hatfield man' had often played a leading role in campus reform, in spite of his sometimes reactionary image. One of Durham's more traditional colleges, Hatfield holds formal dinners featuring a high table, Latin grace and compulsory academic dress — it also exclusively retains the titles of Master for its head of college and Senior Man for the president of its junior common room.

After many decades as a single-sex institution, the first female undergraduates were formally admitted in Michaelmas term 1988.

== History ==
=== Early years ===
The establishment of the college in 1846 as a furnished and catered residence with a fixed annual charge, an "arrangement where students would be provided with furnished rooms and meals for a flat fee", was revolutionary at the time. Previously, university students were expected to furnish their rooms themselves. The young founding master, David Melville, believed his model would make a university education more affordable. (Note: Essentially, the three principles were that rooms would be furnished and let out to students with shared servants, meals would be provided and eaten in the college hall, and college battels (bills) were set in advance.) This system made Hatfield a more economical choice when compared to University College, whose students were generally wealthier, and ensured that student numbers at Hatfield built up steadily. The success of Melville's model led to another college, Bishop Cosin's Hall, opening along the same lines in 1851, and the model was introduced to the wider university after an endorsement from the Royal Commission of 1862. (Note: Melville, who stepped down in 1851, was "at least partially a victim of his own success" as the cheaper cost of Hatfield sparked an ever growing demand for places, thus forcing the college to spend to acquire more and more space.)

Although not intended as a theological college, for the first 50 years the majority of students tended towards theology, while senior staff members and the principal were in holy orders. Under William Sanday (1876–1883) student numbers rose considerably, prompting an urgent search for extra rooms. Hatfield rented 3 South Bailey (now part of St John's College) in 1879 to accommodate the increase. Though Hatfield was run on the most economical lines, student poverty was a frequent problem. Dr Joseph Fowler, who acted as Bursar in addition to his roles as Chaplain and Senior Tutor, allowed undergraduates to take on some debt and even advanced loans personally. In 1880, a tennis court was installed for the first time, occupying roughly the same space as the current one. In the 1890s, the college purchased Bailey House and the Rectory to accommodate more students. As the end of the century drew closer, the balance of students rapidly shifted away from theology and towards arts. By 1904, theology undergraduates made up only a small minority of students in residence.

=== Inter-war ===
For 20 years Hatfield cooperated with nearby Castle

The inter-war period saw a decline in college fortunes. In the first two decades of the 20th century, Hatfield had experienced a sharp fall in numbers. This was caused initially by the decision to isolate science courses at the campus in Newcastle, an increased tendency to train priests at specialised colleges, poor finances, and finally the outbreak of the First World War. For 15 years after 1897, total students in residence numbered above 100. This had fallen to 69 in 1916, 2 in 1917, and to 3 in 1918. After the war finished there was a temporary leap to more than 60 undergraduates, but by 1923 there were just 14 men on the college books. In 1924, a new science department was established in Durham, and this, along with the active recruiting efforts of new Master Arthur Robinson (1923–1940), achieved gains in student numbers. Within five years of Robinson's appointment they had quintupled from the low of 1923.

However, the economic crisis of the 1920s created uncertainty. Hatfield had more students than University College yet lacked the facilities, especially kitchens, to accommodate them. University College, on the other hand, was comparatively undersubscribed. To address this, the two colleges effectively amalgamated under the guidance of Angus Macfarlane-Grieve, and all meals were taken together in the Great Hall of University College, while each college retained its own set of officers and clubs. Unhappy with this arrangement, some Hatfielders expressed their separate identity in trivial ways: for example, using a different door to enter the Castle dining hall than the University College students, and, in contrast to the University College contingent – turning to face the High Table during grace.

The political situation in Europe impacted college activities: during one memorable rag week in 1936, Hatfield students staged a mock Nazi procession to the nearby Market Square, with participants dressing in jackboots, brown shirts, and fascist armbands. One of them, Joe Crouch, a fluent German speaker, comically impersonated Adolf Hitler and delivered an impromptu speech to the assembled crowd. In 1938, fears of an impending war resulted in the construction of an air raid shelter, with dons and servants digging trenches in the Master's garden (now Dunham Court). Gas masks were issued to college residents. Meanwhile, a recent decline in the number of freshers, and the death that year of John Hall How, the Master of University College, gave rise to rumours that Hatfield would be annexed to its older neighbour.

=== World War II ===
In October 1939, Hatfielders were barred from their own college when the university decided to use Hatfield as a temporary site for the new Neville's Cross College, an institution for training women teachers. Having spent over a decade taking meals in Castle, they would now be prevented from using Hatfield buildings altogether. Without its own buildings and Master, and the issue of the ongoing war, Hatfield was in a poor position to recruit new students, an era later described as the "wilderness years" by college archivist Arthur Moyes.

However, the college received an unexpected new lease of life when the Royal Air Force established short courses at the university for some of its cadets, and soon these cadets made up half of the Hatfield student body. This led the university to postpone plans to merge Hatfield with University College. Plans were revived again in 1943, but met the strong opposition of Hatfield dons, especially Hedley Sparks. In 1946, the centenary year of the college, members formed the Hatfield Association to both represent alumni and demonstrate to the university council that Hatfield was supported.

=== Post-war ===
The university finally decided that from October 1949, Hatfield would be reestablished as an independent college – with Vindolanda archaeologist Eric Birley (1949–1956) appointed to serve as the new Master. The post-war period saw Hatfield once again faced with the familiar problem of squeezing in a larger student population. Numbers continued to rise until they reached just over 200 by the 1954–55 academic year, and more buildings had to be constructed and refurbished as a result. Kingsgate House in Bow Lane was also purchased and became a permanent master's lodging.

In a sign of changing attitudes towards authority, students voted to boycott formal dinners in May 1964 after a dispute with Master Thomas Whitworth (1957–1979) over whether or not jeans counted as formal wear. Reforms were subsequently introduced. Joint standing committees, composed equally of staff and students, were set up to "deliberate almost every conceivable topic" and the undergraduate Senior Man was allowed to take part in meetings of the college's governing body. By 1971, a "liberal and balanced" Governing Body had been achieved, with both college tutors and delegates from the Junior Common Room, and a representative from the Hatfield Association alumni group.

=== Modern ===
The leadership of James Barber (1980–1996) was a period of significant change. Student numbers rose, increasing to over 650 by the time Barber finished his tenure in office. Living out became compulsory for students for at least part of their career, and many existing buildings were either rebuilt or refurbished to make room for students: The Rectory was remodeled, C & D Stairs were refurbished, the Main Hall was repaired, and Jevons' was redecorated. Student conduct was sometimes an issue: the annual Hatfield Day was cancelled for two years after excessive drinking and anti-social behaviour at the 1984 event, while the JCR was sued by the band Mud when a partygoer ruined four speakers by pouring beer into an amplifier during a college ball performance.

Hatfield also became co-educational, which at the time was only "grudgingly accepted" by the college. In 1985, talk of going mixed was stimulated by the low numbers of applicants selecting Hatfield as their preference, and a recent decline in academic standards – with the college finishing bottom of the results table the previous year. Ignoring threats of hooliganism, Barber resolved in May of that year to push forward with plans to go mixed. In a March 1987 referendum, 79.2% voted for the college to remain men only. The Senate decided that, despite the referendum result, the college would in fact go mixed – and the first female undergraduates arrived the following year. The first female Senior Man was elected in 1992. (Note: Her election win, by a single vote, prompted some students to declare a mock 'week of mourning' and walk around the college wearing black arm bands.)

== Buildings ==
=== Main Court ===
The oldest part of the college site is likely what is now the dining room, believed to date back to the 17th century. It originally formed part of a town house owned by a wealthy member of local society, and was converted in 1760 into a coaching inn, The Red Lion – a stopping point for coaches travelling between London and Edinburgh. During this time it also hosted concerts, probably featuring the work of composers like Charles Avison and John Garth. In 1799 the old coaching inn reverted to being a private residence.

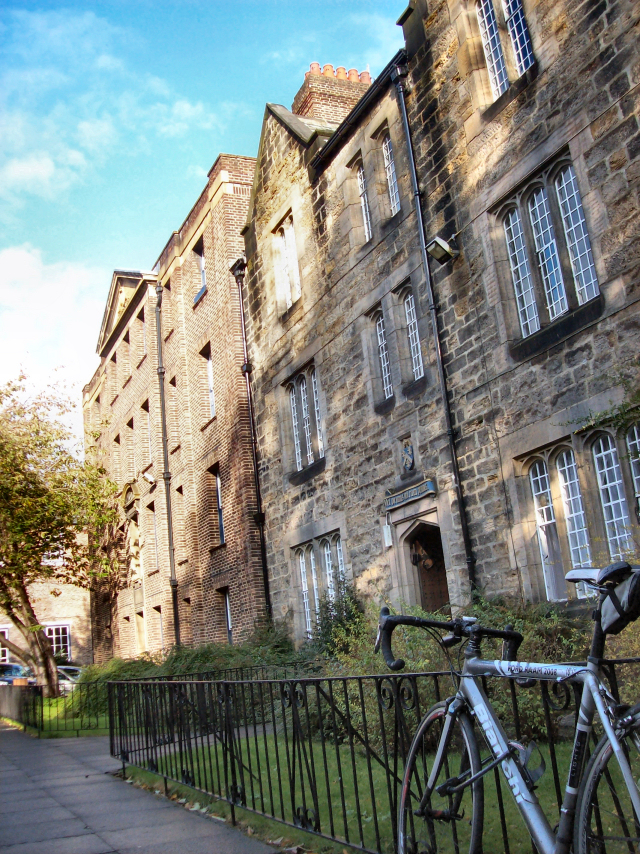
C Stairs (left) and the Melville Building (right)

In 1845, it was sold to the university, and emerged as the first component of the newly founded Hatfield College the following year. Much more extensive when first occupied by Hatfield, since then "substantial parts of the building" have been replaced by newer structures. Apart from the dining room, what remains are spaces adjoining it that were once used by travellers, but are now filled by the Senior Common Room (SCR) – formerly a card room – the SCR dining room; and finally, on the higher floors, the 'D Stairs' student accommodation block. D Staircase has had a reputation for being haunted by a female spirit, recognisable by the aroma of a distinctive perfume.

At the west end of the dining room is Kitchen Block, which features the main kitchens as well as a small number of student rooms and offices on the higher floors. 'C Stairs', holding the C accommodation block, was officially opened in 1932 by Lord Halifax. It replaced an earlier section of the coaching inn used since the founding of the college.

Designed by Anthony Salvin, A & B Stairs – also used for undergraduate housing – was completed in 1849 at a cost of £4,000, and was the first purpose-built part of the college. Containing A and B accommodation blocks, it was renamed and rededicated as the Melville Building in 2005 after a £1 million refurbishment. Author Josceline Dimbleby, the great-great-granddaughter of David Melville, was invited to perform the ceremony.

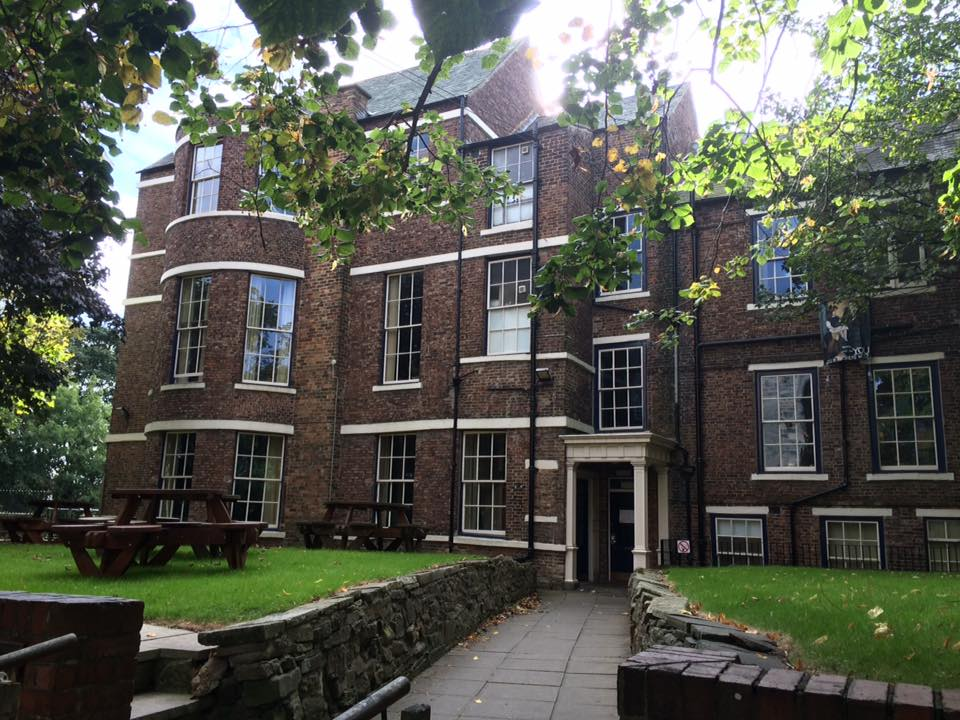
The Rectory

The Rectory was acquired in 1897, and serves as the administrative hub of the college. It holds various offices, including those of the Master, the Vice-Master & Senior Tutor, the Chaplain, and the Finance Officer. The Birley Room, used for social functions, can be found on the ground floor.

Added to the college at the same time as the Rectory, Hatfield Cottage is in between the redundant church of St Mary-le-Bow (now the Durham Museum and Heritage Centre) and Gatehouse Block. It is the location of the Middle Common Room (MCR).

Gatehouse Block is to the right of the entrance and houses the porters' lodge. It also has single and twin use student rooms. In 1961 the college had begun a project to replace the remnants of a much older gatehouse that was in poor condition. The new pseudo-Georgian replacement was completed by Easter 1962 for a total cost of £55,000. To provide an unbroken front to the North Bailey, decorative gates and railings were installed in the aftermath.

=== Dunham Court ===
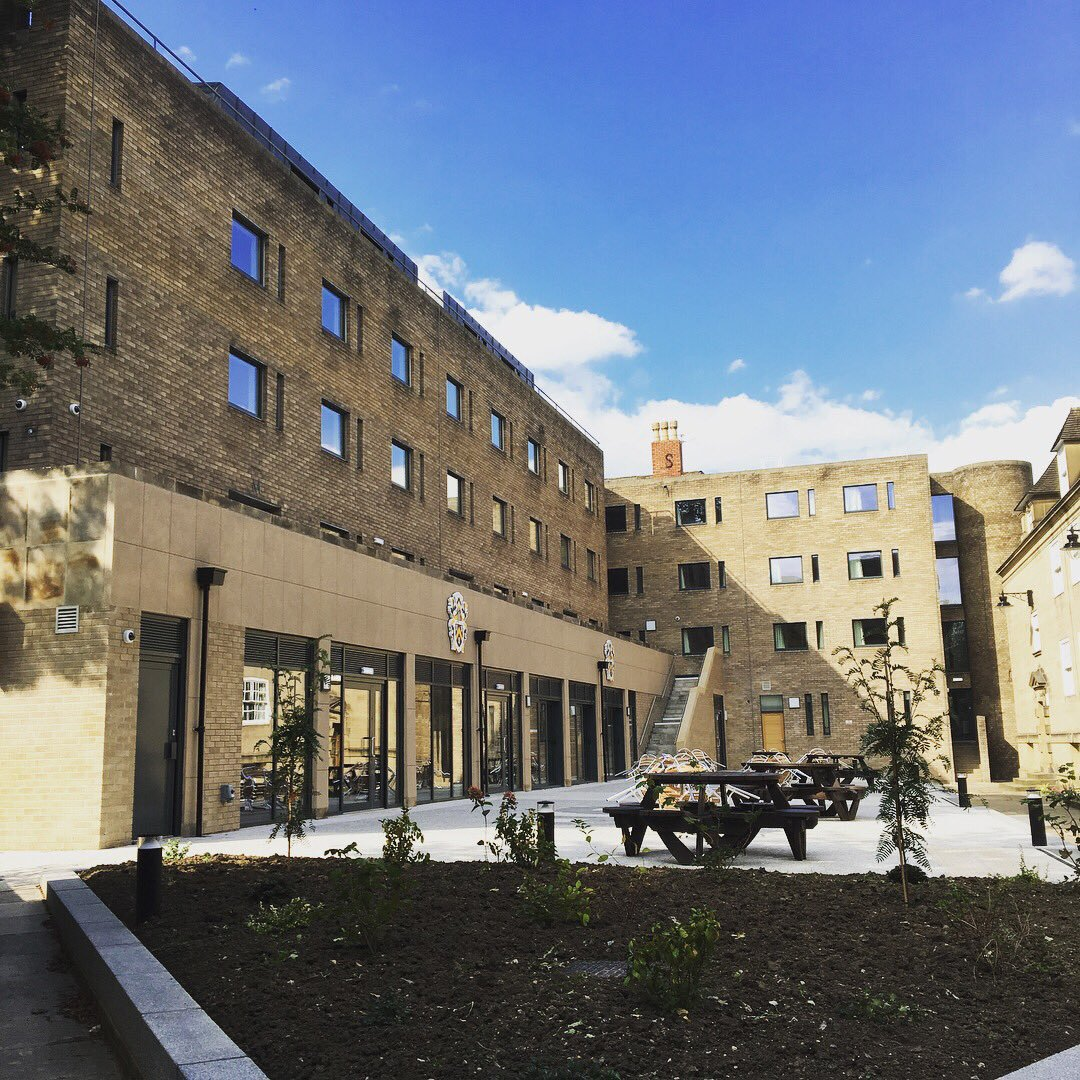
Jevons, after 2018 renovation

Named after alumnus Kingsley Dunham, Dunham Court is the second quadrangle of the college. Accessed through an underpass by the chapel, it comprises two buildings, Jevons (Frank Jevons) and Pace (Edward Pace). Owing to the influx of extra students after the war, the college required more accommodation and the space provided by the garden of the old Jevon's House was the obvious choice. The new building, described by Pevsner as "friendly", with a "nice rhythm of windows towards the river", was finished in 1950 and named after former Vice-Master Edward Pace.

The college commenced the largest building project in its history when it demolished old Jevon's House, a "property of advanced decrepitude" once occupied by the bare-knuckle boxer and politician John Gully before its purchase by the university. As parts of the building had become dangerous by this point, the entire structure had to be removed. Construction of the new modernist style Jevons Building, which would complete the new Dunham Court, began in June 1966. It was officially unveiled in a ceremony in June 1968, attended by both Kingsley Dunham and Lord Lieutenant of Durham James Duff. It won a Civic Trust Award the following year. In 1972 a fishpond, since removed, was constructed in the centre of the court at the encouragement of senior college officers.

Both buildings contain rooms and social spaces: the college bar and café is located in Jevons, while Pace has a TV lounge, a music room, a kitchen, two gyms, and the JCR Common Room.

=== Chapel ===
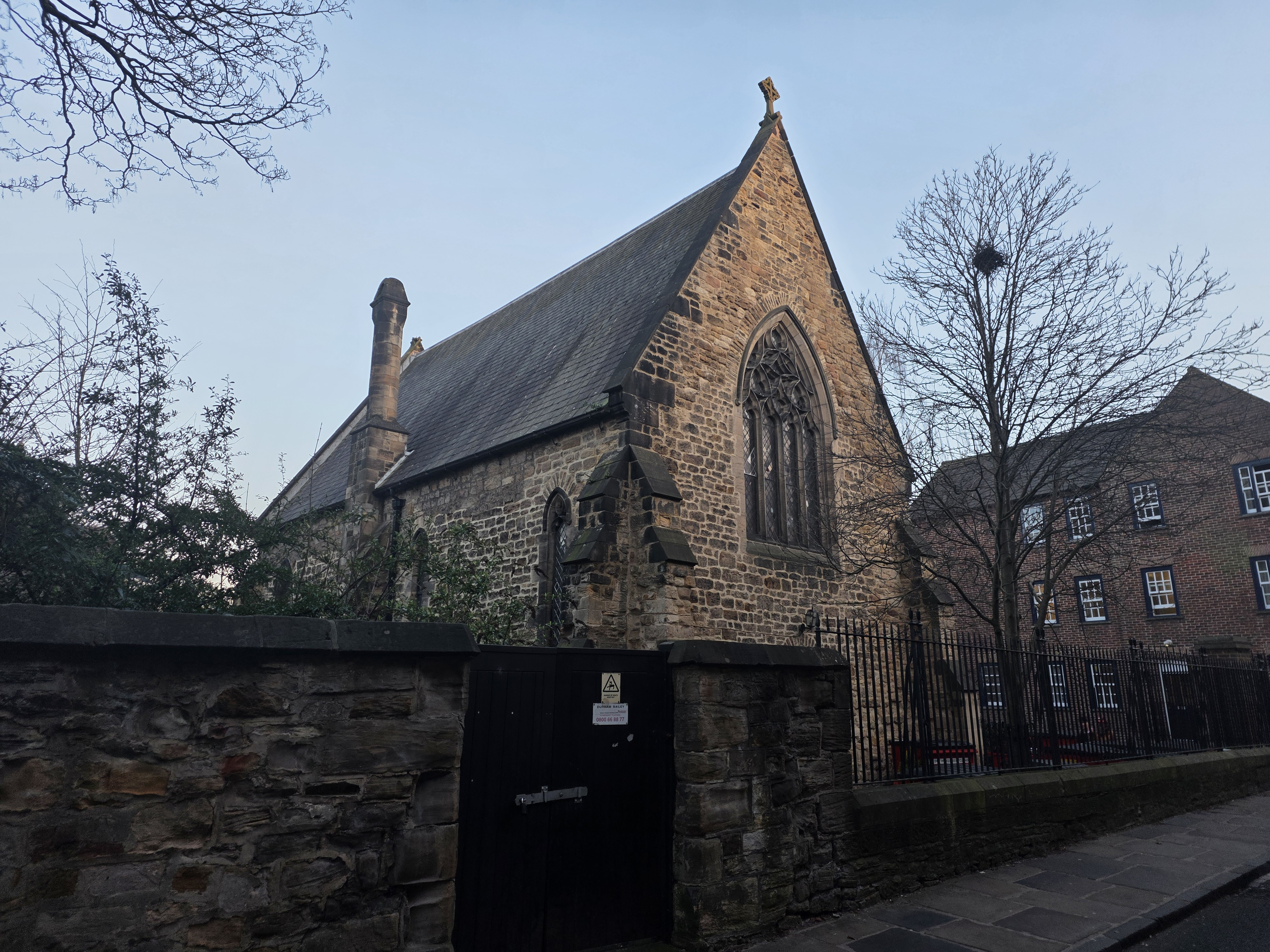
The chapel from North Bailey

The college chapel was conceived in 1851 and completed in 1854, funded by alumni donations and supplemented with a loan of £150 from the university. Designed by Bishop Cosin's Hall chaplain, James Turner (also a trained architect), it contains head sculptures of William Van Mildert, the founder of the university, and Warden Thorp, the first Vice-Chancellor. The fall of the land eastwards meant the chapel had to be supported on basement arches, which became a 'delightful' covered footpath when the college later expanded.

Commemorative oak panels mark the fallen of the First World War, with a book of remembrance naming those lost in the Second World War. The chapel houses a Harrison & Harrison organ, which is used to accompany services and for recitals and was refurbished in 2001 at a cost of £65,000.

When Hatfield was founded, students were required to attend services at Durham Cathedral. Once the chapel was constructed, attendance at these services remained compulsory for the next 80 years. Since then, the chapel has been described as making up an "important but minority interest" within the college.

=== Other buildings ===
Opposite the gatehouse on North Bailey is Bailey House, an accommodation block which provides 50 single rooms, plus a communal and kitchen area on the ground floor.

Palmers Garth is located across the Kingsgate Bridge over the River Wear and offers twin and single rooms for 57 students. The building was an administration office for the university, and once hosted the careers service until it was handed over to the college in 1991.

James Barber House, or JBH for short, is a self-catered residence on nearby Church Street used as postgraduate accommodation. Named after former Master James Barber when purchased in 2006, it was built by Durham County Council as Palatine House in 1968, and originally functioned as a care home for the elderly.

== College traditions ==
=== Arms and motto ===
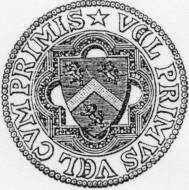
Bishop Hatfield's arms, as used by the college 1846-1954

From its foundation, Hatfield Hall used as its arms the personal shield of Bishop Thomas Hatfield (Azure, a chevron or, between three lions rampant argent). This was accompanied with the Latin motto "Vel Primus Vel Cum Primis", which means "Either First or With the First", and is derived from a description of Bishop Hatfield in a 14th century history of Durham:

Cæterum inerat ei magnanimitas, ut in conventu procerum et magnatum, vel primus, vel cum primis, semper contenderit esse; et inter honorificos honoris locum magnificentius obtineret

[But [Hatfield] had such a sense of grandeur, that in a gathering of nobles and magnates he always strove to be either first or with the first; and to occupy a place of honour more magnificently among the honoured]

— William de Chambre (attributed), History of Durham, in Historiae Dunelmensis Scriptores Tres, ed. James Raine (1839)

This motto is now loosely interpreted by the college as "Be the Best you can Be".

In 1954, the college learned that these arms had not been granted to the college by the College of Arms, and its assumption of Bishop Hatfield's shield without a grant was inappropriate and illegal. Consequently, it sought a grant of its own from the College of Arms, and was granted new arms based on Hatfield's shield, but with an ermine bordure added to difference the college's arms from the bishop's. A crest was also added, of ostrich feathers, charged with a black chevron, issuing from a crown. The motto was also made an official part of the grant.

A drawing of the new shield, without the crest, was produced by student Rodney Lucas for use in the annual Hatfield Record, and was used on college stationery for many years. In 1994, Lucas contacted the college with a new rendering of the college arms made on a computer, which was subsequently adopted. In 2005, the university produced a new representation of the arms as part of a university rebrand.

=== Academic dress ===
Similar to most Bailey Colleges, the wearing of the undergraduate academic gown is required for formal events, including to the matriculation ceremony and all formal dinners held in college.

=== Choir ===
The chapel choir is made up of students who support regular worship in the chapel, but also sing at other churches and cathedrals, with annual tours undertaken both at home and abroad. The choir is led by a student choral director, supported by an organ scholar and deputy organ scholar.

Eight choral scholarships are offered annually, after an audition and interview process with the chaplain during first term. A further scholarship, the Matthew Fantom Organ Scholarship, is available to those students in the early stages of learning to play the organ and who would not be ready to apply for the regular organ scholarships.

=== Formals ===
In Michaelmas term (first term) and Epiphany term (second term), formal dinners are once every fortnight, on Fridays. Few formals are held during Easter term (third term) as students' attention is increasingly focused on exams and assignments. A High table, consisting of senior staff, is also present during formal meals.

Unique to Hatfield is the tradition of 'spooning', in which students bang spoons on the edge of the table or on silverware for several minutes before the formal starts. The act immediately ceases when the High Table walks in.

==== Grace ====
Benedicte Deus, qui pascis nos a iuventute nostra et praebes cibum omni carni, reple gaudio et laetitia corda nostra, ut nos, quod satis est habentes, abundemus in omne opus bonum. Per Jesum Christum, Dominum Nostrum, cui tecum et Spiritu Sancto, sit omnis honor, laus et imperium in saecula saeculorum. Amen.

This can be translated as:

Blessed God, who feedest us from our youth, and providest food for all flesh, fill our hearts with joy and gladness, that we, having enough to satisfy us, may abound in every good work, through Jesus Christ our Lord, to whom with thee and the Holy Spirit, be all honour and praise and power for all ages. Amen.

Since 1846 the grace has been read at all formal meals in college. It is popular at alumni dinners, where an attempt to read the grace in English was badly received by guests.

Widely used in the fourth century and based on earlier Hebrew prayers, it was translated from the Greek and adopted by Oriel College, Oxford. Hatfield copied it practically verbatim; the college believes this was likely influenced by the Rev. Henry Jenkyns, a Fellow of Oriel before becoming Professor of Greek and Classical Literature at Durham.

=== Hatfield Day ===
Hatfield Day is a day of festivities held every June to celebrate the end of exams. Traditions include 'Storming the Castle', in which Hatfield students wake up early to rush the courtyard of University College and sing college songs.

By the 1980s Hatfield Day was "not an occasion to which children or maiden aunts could be invited". Problems included offensive student pranks, vandalism, and an inability to contain events within the confines of the college. Arrests were not unknown. The Hatfield Day of 1984 required County Durham Fire Brigade to extinguish a fire set by a student.

With the admission of female undergraduates, Hatfield Day became notably "less coarse" as women members of JCR now "exerted an influence" on behaviour.

=== Songs ===
The college song was formerly Green Grow the Rushes, O. It was replaced in 1952 with a surprising selection: 'If I Should Plant a Tiny Seed of Love' by Ballard Macdonald. This "mournful Edwardian ballad" came to be the "rallying song of an increasingly macho Hatfield".

As of 2012, other long-established college songs included Two Little Boys, Jerusalem, and Swing Low, Sweet Chariot.

== Student body ==
As of the 2025/26 academic year, Hatfield College had 1,298 full-time student members. Of these, 400 students lived on-site.

=== Common rooms ===
The Junior Common Room (JCR) is for undergraduates in the college. It annually elects an executive committee consisting of 10 members, including an impartial chair, who run the JCR in conjunction with college officers. Unlike other colleges, Hatfield exclusively retains Senior Man as its title for the head of the JCR, having rejected a motion to move to "JCR President" in May 2014. A motion to allow the incumbent to choose between "Senior Man", "Senior Woman" or "Senior Student" was also defeated in January 2016.

The Middle Common Room (MCR) is the organisation for postgraduate students. Postgraduate accommodation is located at James Barber House. College officers, fellows and tutors are members of the Senior Common Room (SCR).

=== Culture ===
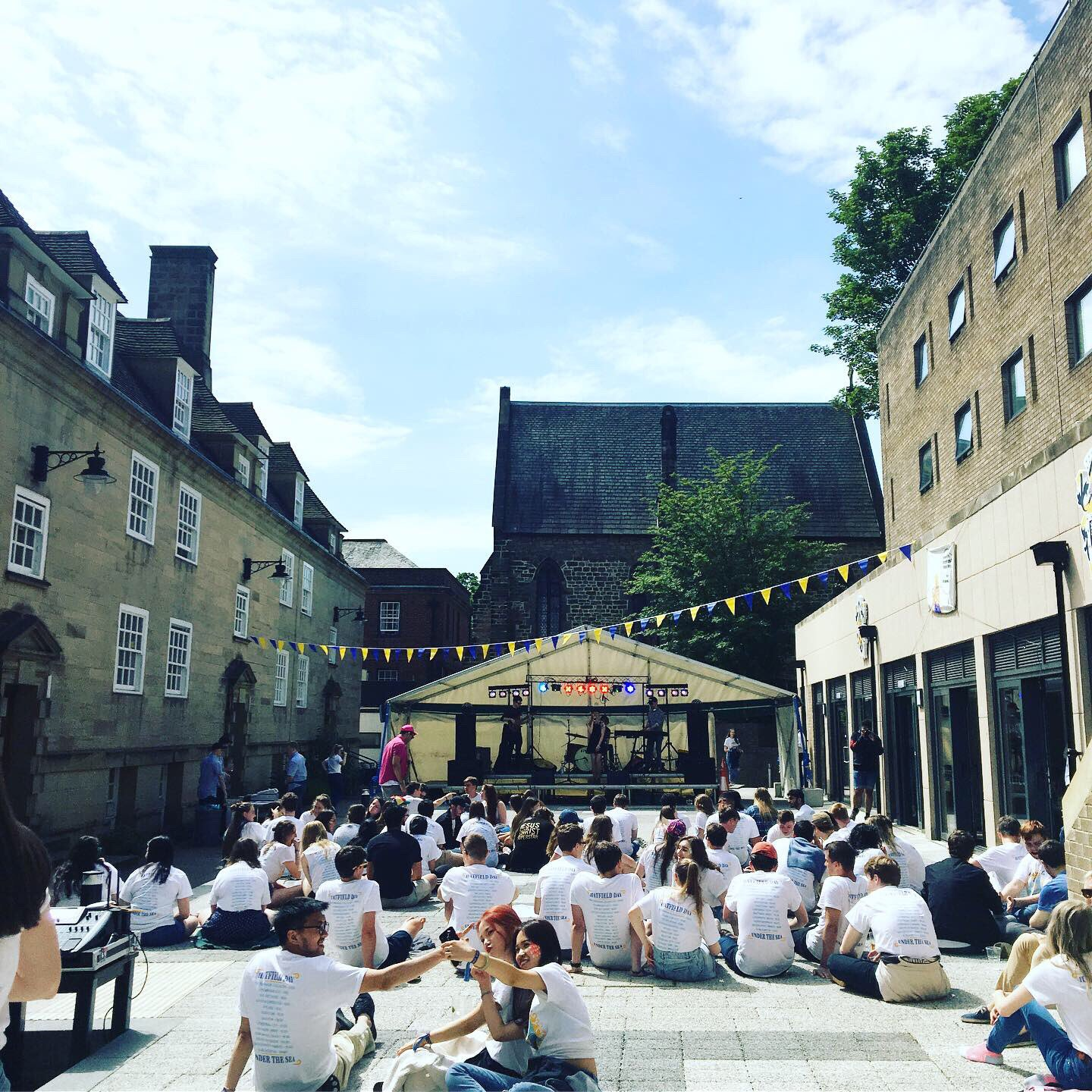
Dunham Court during Hatfield Day

Hatfield developed an impressive sporting reputation in the decades following the Second World War. (Note: Kim Darroch, in his memoir Collateral Damage: Britain, America, and Europe in the Age of Trump, recalls discovering that Hatfield, 'while modest in its academic record, was comfortably the strongest college at sport') Johnathan Young, a 1963 matriculant, later recalled that his contemporaries 'were expected to excel in most sports and particularly rugby'.

A stereotype of Hatfield undergraduates as elitist public schoolboys with a casual attitude to studying emerged in parallel. College leadership was keen to downplay this image, with Master Thomas Whitworth preferring to highlight ambition and leadership as defining traits instead. (Note: Whitworth argued that Hatfield undergraduates and staff members had tended to be the 'genuine progressive, concerned with substance rather than with shadow' and pointed out that they had supported the entry of women into the university, the provision of educational facilities for workers in the North East of England, and were 'notably active' in the creation of new colleges and societies) These views were echoed years later by his successor, James Barber, who emphasised the prominent role of Hatfielders in the university's sporting and cultural life. Writing in 1996, college archivist Arthur Moyes wryly observed that modesty "is not a Hatfield characteristic".

Former students have praised a "work hard, play hard ethos" conducive to future success as well as a strong collegiate identity. Nevertheless, owing to its higher than average private school intake, campus publications have criticised Hatfield for being 'rah' and reinforcing the idea that the wider university is socially exclusive. (Note: During the 1960s the state school share of the freshers intake averaged 63%, but this had dropped to 32% by October 1995. For the 2015/2016 cycle, 65.8% of applicants were privately educated – against a university average figure of only 36.1%.)

=== Admissions ===
To attract a broader range of candidates, the college operates outreach programmes working with pupils in local state schools in Gateshead, Hartlepool, and Washington. A range of scholarships to support applicants from lower-income households are also available.

In the application cycles from 2017 through 2020, Hatfield ranked in the top 5 colleges by number of first-choice preferences, but fell to 8th place for 2021 entry. That year it was the 'most polarizing college', having seen the largest increase in last-place rankings. By 2025 entry, Hatfield had risen to 6th out of 16 colleges for first preferences, marginally ahead of South College and behind University College, Collingwood College, St Chad's College, John Snow College, and St Mary's College.

== College officers and fellows ==
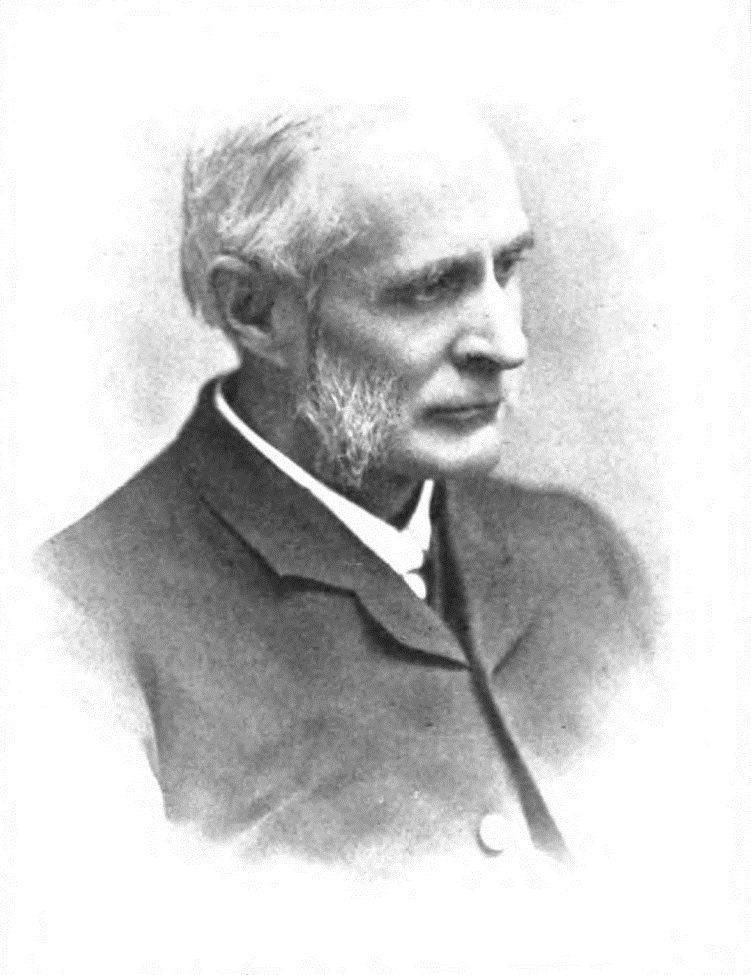
William Sanday

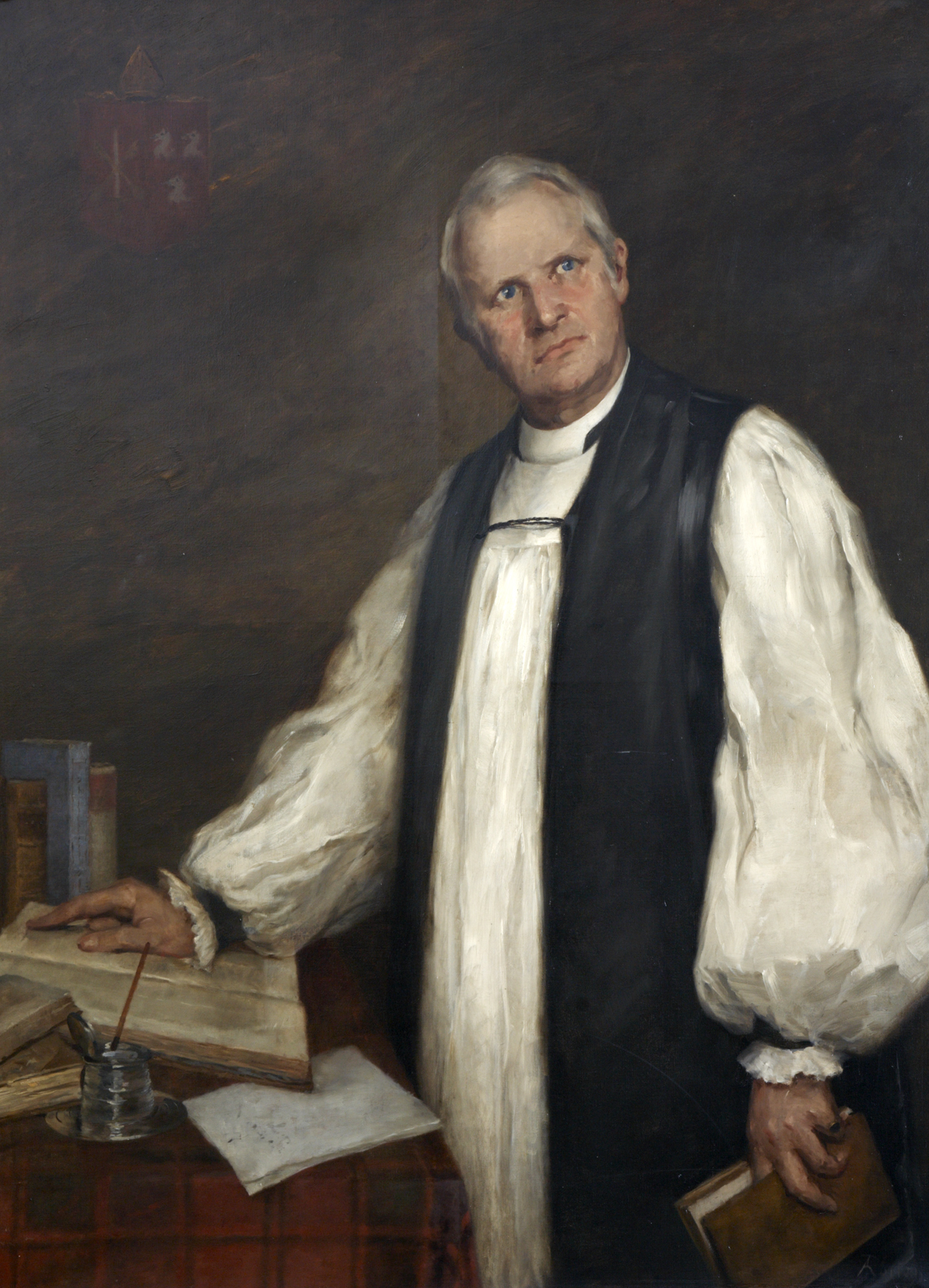
Archibald Robertson

=== Master ===
The current Master is Ann MacLarnon, Professor of Evolutionary Anthropology at Durham University, who assumed the role in September 2017.

List of past masters

- David Melville (1846–1851)
- William Henderson (1851–1852)
- Edward Bradby (Michaelmas Term 1852)
- James Lonsdale (1853–1854)
- John Pedder (1854–1859)
- James Barmby (1859–1876)
- William Sanday (1876–1883)
- Archibald Robertson (1883–1897)
- Frank Jevons (1896–1923)
- Arthur Robinson (1923–1940)
- Angus Macfarlane-Grieve (1940–1949)
- Eric Birley (1949–1956)
- Thomas Whitworth (1957–1979)
- James Barber (1980–1996)
- Tim Burt (1996–2017)

=== Fellows ===
Hatfield College Council awards honorary fellowships to distinguished alumni and others closely associated with the college. Honorary fellows automatically become honorary members of the SCR and receive the same benefits. By 2012 there were 24 honorary fellows, among them the former university chancellor Bill Bryson.

Hatfield appoints junior and senior research fellows. The college also regularly hosts visiting academics, including those affiliated with the fellowship scheme offered by the university's Institute of Advanced Study.

== Sports and societies ==
=== Hatfield College Boat Club ===
The blade colours of Hatfield College Boat Club

The boat club was started in 1846, shortly after the founding of the college. There is a Novice Development programme for absolute beginners. It also trains coxes and has a dedicated Coxes Captain.

The club competes in head races and regattas, including the Head of the River Race, Henley Royal Regatta, Durham Regatta, as well as inter-collegiate competitions run by Durham College Rowing.

Notable former members of the club include Alice Freeman, Louisa Reeve, Angus Groom, and Simon Barr. An alumni society, The White Lion Club, connects current students with alumni at key events throughout the year such as the Head of the River Race, Durham Regatta and the annual Christmas dinner.

=== Rugby ===
Hatfield College has long been associated with rugby union – to the extent that Thomas Whitworth (Master, 1957–79), a rugby enthusiast, gained a reputation for giving rugby-playing students preferential treatment. In the decades after the Second World War, Hatfield dominated intercollegiate rugby, conceding the colleges cup just once in a 14-year period up to 1971. The Durham University team that won the 1969 University Athletic Union final against Newcastle University was composed largely of Hatfield players.

Success continued through the 1970s, 1980s, and 1990s, during which a record of 30 cup wins in 32 years was achieved. The 1995 cup final was noteworthy for being an all-Hatfield event, contested by the college's A and B teams. Double protein portions for university rugby players are still offered in the college dining hall each meal-time.

Rugby alumni include former England captain Will Carling, 2003 Rugby World Cup winner Will Greenwood, and Marcus Rose, who represented England in the 1987 Rugby World Cup. (Note: In total, 8 former students have won senior England caps. Other than Carling, Greenwood, and Rose, they are Toby Allchurch, Charlie Hannaford, Andy Mullins, Dave Walder, and Peter Warfield. In addition, Richard Breakey and Jeremy Campbell-Lamerton were capped by Scotland, while Fitz Harding has played for England A)

=== Lion Theatre Company ===
The Lion Theatre Company is the official Hatfield drama society and puts on both Hatfield-only plays as well as more ambitious shows that bring in student actors from outside Hatfield. Recent productions have included plays by Pinter, Shakespeare, and Dario Fo, and also student-devised pieces.

Since the 2012/13 academic year, the company has occasionally staged productions at the Assembly Rooms to provide members with a "stepping stone" to university theatre.

== Alumni ==
=== Hatfield Association ===
Active since 1946, it was originally founded to fight the threat of Hatfield being shut down as an independent college. The association organises alumni reunion events and has a membership of more than 4,000 graduates.

=== Hatfield Trust ===
Established in 1987 to get around the financial limitations of being a maintained college, the Hatfield Trust is essentially the college endowment fund. It relies on contributions from alumni and supporters to fund student activities, bursaries, and one-off projects. The value of the trust stood at £500,000 by 1998. As a way to encourage more frequent donations from former students, the 1846 Club enables donors to make pledges of £18.46 annually, quarterly, or monthly.

=== Notable people ===
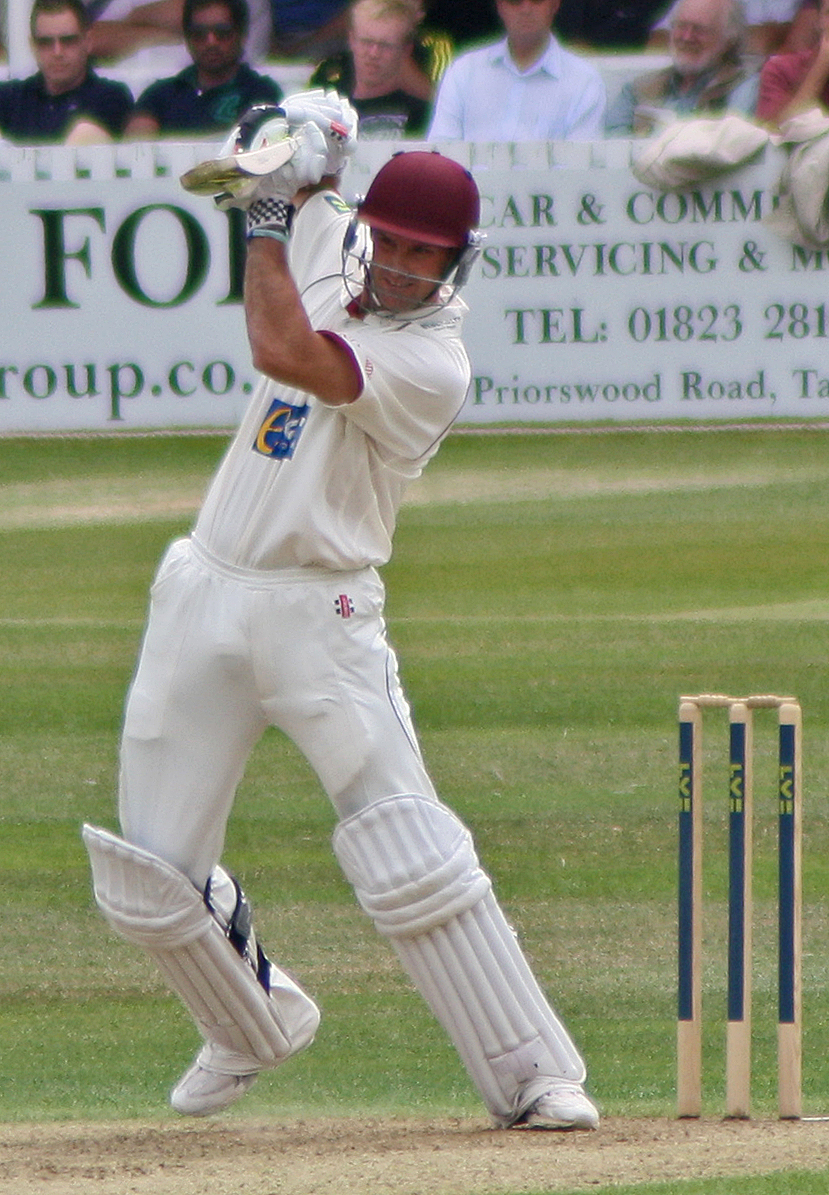
Andrew Strauss

There are examples of notable alumni of Hatfield College in various fields, including government, academia, arts, and sport to name just a few. (Note: 8 former students are featured in the Oxford Dictionary of National Biography. They are, in order of surname, Kingsley Dunham, Alastair Haggart, Harold Orton, Frederick William Sanderson, Jake Thackray, Percy Warrington, Adrian Woodruffe-Peacock, and Ted Wragg)

The sporting alumni of Hatfield College may be the most famous, among them former England rugby union captain Will Carling, 2003 Rugby World Cup winner Will Greenwood, and former England cricket team captain Andrew Strauss. More recently, rower Angus Groom was a silver medallist at the 2020 Summer Olympics.

Government figures to have attended Hatfield include Robert Buckland, a former Secretary of State for Justice and Lord Chancellor; Edward Timpson, former MP for Eddisbury and Minister of State for Children and Families; and Labour Party life peer Baron Carter of Coles. At least 5 alumni have held ambassadorial level posts in the Foreign Office, most notably Kim Darroch, previously British Ambassador to the United States.

Hatfielders in the military include Lord Dannatt, a former Chief of the General Staff, and one of his successors in the same role – General Mark Carleton-Smith. The late Air Marshall Peter Walker, Rear Admiral Andrew Burns, the current Fleet Commander, and retired Rear Admiral Matt Parr were also Hatfield undergraduates, in addition to Major-General Peter Grant Peterkin, later appointed Serjeant at Arms in the House of Commons.

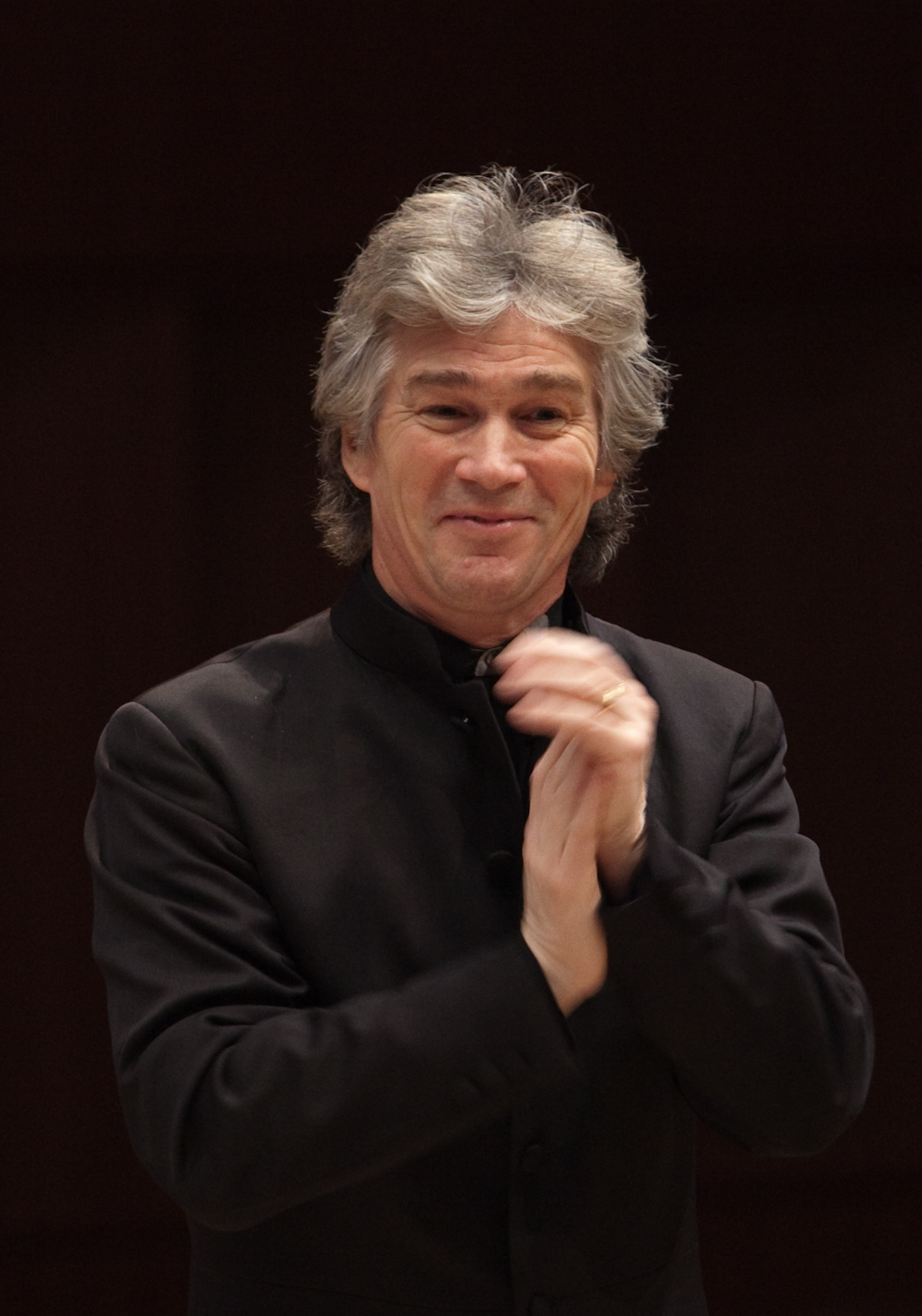
Jonathan Darlington

In the media, presenters Jeremy Vine, Mark Durden-Smith, Jonathan Gould, and Mark Pougatch; and David Shukman, Science Editor of BBC News (2012–2021), were all students at the college.

In the arts world, travel writer Alexander Frater was a Hatfield student, as was the poet and memoirist Thomas Blackburn, fashion journalist Colin McDowell, singer-songwriter Jake Thackray, comedian Ed Gamble, and conductor Jonathan Darlington.

Ecclesiastical alumni are numerous: with former Bishop of Derby Peter Dawes, former Bishop of Cyprus and the Gulf Clive Handford, and Morris Gelsthorpe, the first Bishop in the Sudan, making up just a small sample.

In academia, names include computer scientist Keith Clark, Professor of Computational Logic at Imperial College London (1987–2009); particle physicist Nigel Glover, a current professor at Durham; Rebecca Goss, Professor of Organic Chemistry at the University of St Andrews; and Gordon Cameron, Professor of Land Economy at the University of Cambridge (1980–1990) and Master of Fitzwilliam College, Cambridge (1988–1990).

Eden Project founder Tim Smit, BP executive Richard Paniguian, Oliver Bonas founder Oliver Tress, and David Arkless, Chairman of End Human Trafficking Now, are all examples of alumni with a background in business.

== See also ==
- List of Hatfield College alumni with articles on Wikipedia
- History of Durham University
