= Bishop Cosin's Hall =

Defunct college of the University of Durham

- University of Durham

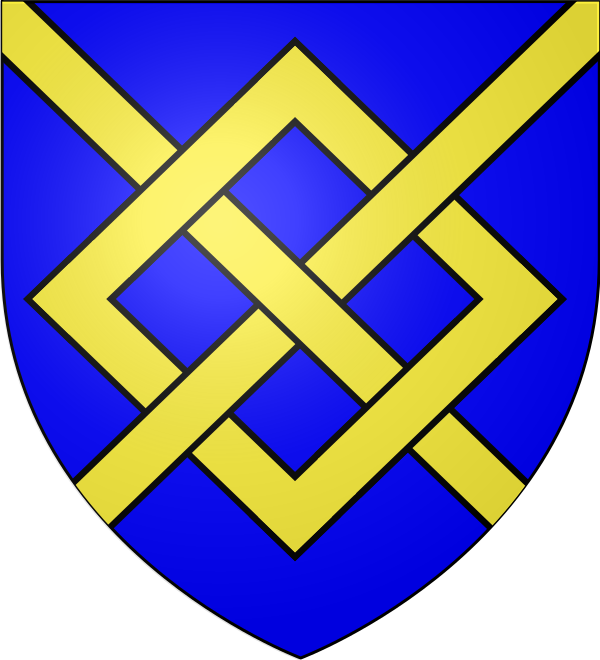
- Arms of Bishop Cosin, used by the hall Arms: Azure, a fret or
- Location: Palace Green, Durham
- Coordinates: 54.774590°N 1.575220°W
- Founded: 1851
- Closed: 1864
- Named after: John Cosin
- Status: Closed

Map
- Location within Durham, England

Listed Building – Grade II*
- Official name: Bishop Cosin's Hall
- Designated: 6 May 1952
- Reference no.: 1121384

Bishop Cosin's Hall was a college of the University of Durham, opened in 1851 as the university's third college and named after 17th century Bishop of Durham John Cosin. It closed in 1864 due to a fall in student recruitment at the university.

It was housed in an 18th-century building on Palace Green which still carries its name.

== History ==
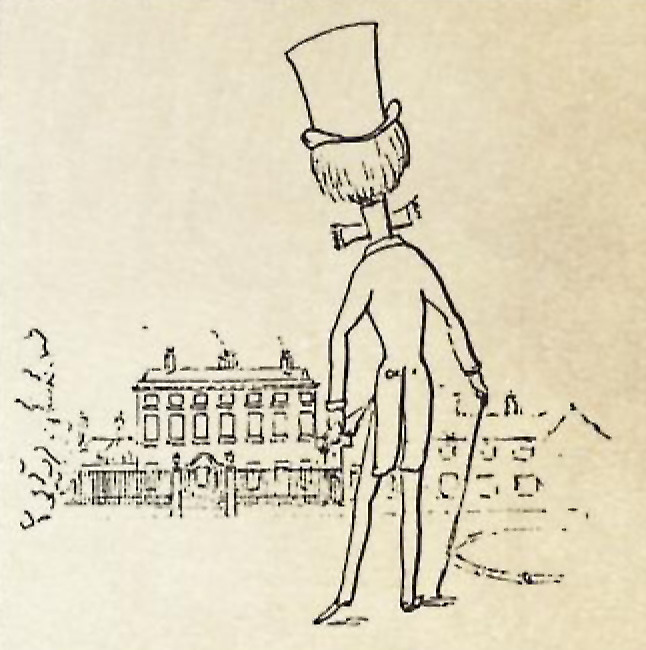
University House in the late 1840s, drawn by Edward Bradley

=== The building ===
Archdeacon's Inn was built around 1700, as a city residence for the Archdeacon of Northumberland, who administered the Northern part of the Diocese of Durham (which in 1882 would become the Diocese of Newcastle).

In 1833, the building was given to the University of Durham as the home of University College and the residence of the university's first students.

The Students' Apartments are in the Archdeacon's Inn, on the Palace Green

— First Calendar of the University of Durham, 1833

The first students took residence in Michaelmas Term 1833, under the supervision of the Bursar. A hall was created on the ground floor of the house, with student rooms above and below.

The building subsequently became known as "University House".

In 1837, Durham Castle was granted to the university and became the primary home of University College, with University House being retained as additional accommodation for the college.

=== Foundation of Bishop Cosin's Hall ===
In 1846, David Melville opened Bishop Hatfield's Hall, initiating the pioneering practice of letting rooms furnished and serving food communally at a fixed price. This was intended to make university attendance far more accessible to students of limited means, compared to University College and the colleges of Oxford and Cambridge, where students were expected to furnish their own rooms and to engage servants to prepare their food.

The high level of applications for admission to Hatfield Hall led the university to decide to establish a second hall to operate on the same basis, and in October 1851 Bishop Cosin's Hall was opened. Its name was in honour of John Cosin, Bishop of Durham 1660–72, and it is recorded as having used his heraldry.

University House was transferred from University College to the new college as its home. The founding principal was Revd John Pedder, a Durham graduate who had previously been bursar at University College.

In 1854 Pedder moved to become principal at Bishop Hatfield's Hall, and his place was taken by 28-year-old Revd James John Hornby, a fellow of Brasenose College, Oxford and a noted rower. From 1859, Hornby was also vice-master of University College.

== Closure ==
A collapse in student numbers in the late 1850s and 1860s led to financial difficulties for the university. In 1860, Hornby wrote to Henry Montagu Villiers, the newly appointed Bishop of Durham, requesting his aid in obtaining a royal commission to address the university's difficulties. The bishop replied expressing sympathy, but saying that he could not make any definite pledge of assistance.

The commission took place in 1861-2 and made extensive recommendations, but did not have enough immediate effect to save Bishop Cosin's Hall, which was merged into University College at the start of Michaelmas Term 1864 due to falling student numbers. The students in residence were transferred partly to University College and partly to Bishop Hatfield's Hall, while Hornby returned to Brasenose, and would later become headmaster of Eton College from 1868 to 1884.

The building has retained the name "Cosin's Hall". It continued to be used by University College for accommodation and offices until 2006, after which it was taken over by the university's Institute of Advanced Study.

== People ==
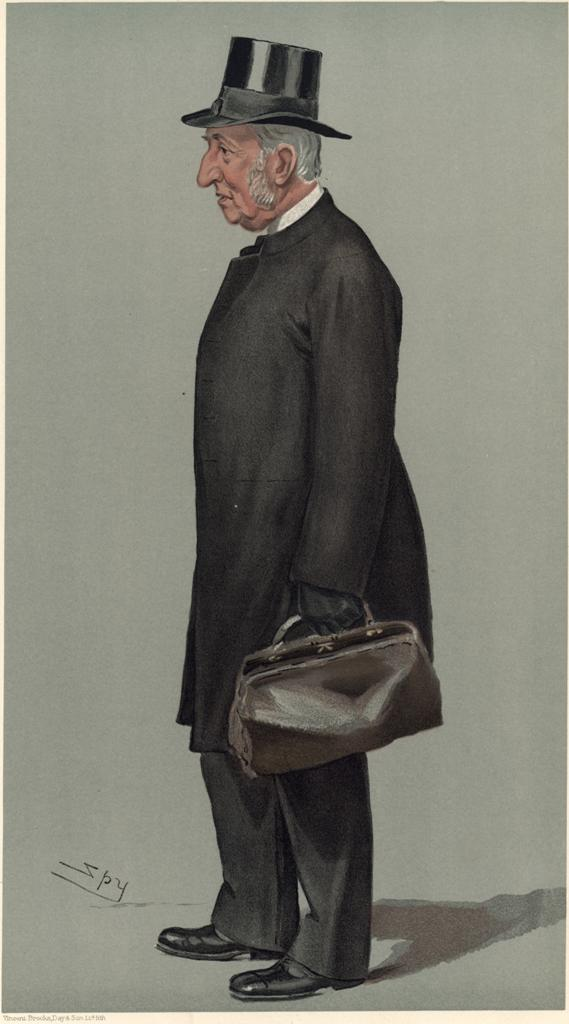
Later caricature of principal J J Hornby in 1900, after his retirement as headmaster of Eton College

=== Principals ===
1851-4
John Pedder (former Bursar of University College; later Principal of Hatfield Hall)
1854–64
James John Hornby (fellow of Brasenose College, Oxford; later headmaster of Eton College)

=== Chaplains and Censors ===
1853-4
James Francis Turner (later Bishop of Grafton and Armidale, Australia)
1855–63
William Greenwell (formerly principal of Neville Hall, Newcastle; archaeologist and Canon of Durham, later Durham Cathedral librarian)
