= James John Hornby =

English rower and headmaster

The Reverend James John Hornby, DD, CVO (18 December 1826 – 2 November 1909) was an English rower and headmaster of Eton College from 1868 to 1884.

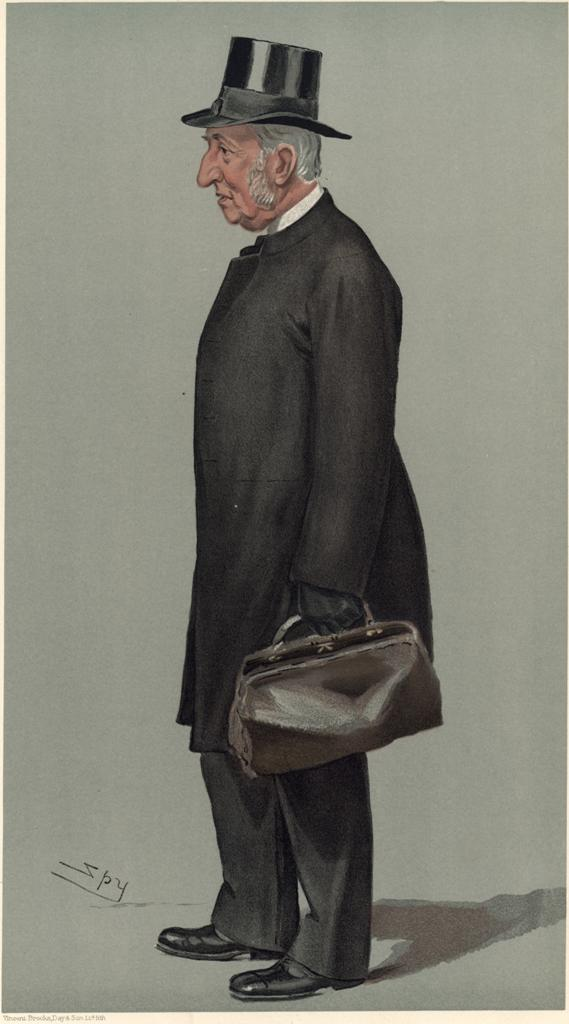
J J Hornby "The Head" (Vanity Fair caricature by Spy)

== Early life ==
Hornby was born at Winwick, the third son of Admiral Sir Phipps Hornby and his wife Sophia Maria Burgoyne, eldest daughter of Sir John Burgoyne. He was educated at Eton, where he did not row, but played in the Eton cricket eleven in 1845.

== Rowing ==
Hornby matriculated at Balliol College, Oxford, before being appointed a Fellow of Brasenose College, Oxford in 1849. Whilst at Brasenose, he had the rare distinction of rowing in the college Eight while also being a Fellow. He rowed bow for Oxford in the second Boat Race of 1849, which Oxford won on a foul by bumping Cambridge when Cambridge were in Oxford's water. He was No. 3 in the O.U.B.C. crews that won the Grand Challenge Cup at Henley Royal Regatta in 1850 and 1851 when there was no Boat Race on the Tideway in either year. In 1850, he won the University Pairs and Fours, and the Silver Goblets at Henley with J.W. Chitty. In 1851 he rowed again for Brasenose in the Ladies' Challenge Plate, Stewards' Challenge Cup, and Visitors Challenge Cup. He was a member of the Brasenose College crew which was Head of the River at Oxford in 1852. He had also become known as a fine skater and one of the best Alpine climbers of the day.

== Academic career ==
In 1853, Hornby went to Durham University as Principal of Bishop Cosin's Hall, where he remained until 1864, when the hall was closed and merged into University College, Durham.

Hornby returned to Brasenose as classical lecturer, where Students long after recalled with pleasure the animation of his Virgil lectures and his excellent way of teaching Latin prose. He was also made Senior Proctor. In 1865, he was the first to ascend the northwest ridge of the Silberhorn.

In 1867, he was appointed Second Master of Winchester College, which was seen as a stepping stone to the headmastership of Eton, which had become vacant. He remained at Winchester little more than a year, and was then appointed Headmaster of Eton, in succession to Edward Balston. His appointment was made possible by the conclusions of the Northcote Commission which had removed restrictions among educational endowments, among which was the tradition that the Eton headmaster should come from King's College, Cambridge.

== Eton headmaster and provost ==
With the restrictions gone, Hornby was the first to exercise the increased independent authority of the headmaster. He "taught Eton the art of self-government" and his sixteen years' Headmastership was very successful. As he had not been an Eton master, he had to overcome a certain amount of resentment by his good work, sympathetic temper and his pleasant manners. Guy Nickalls, at Eton in the early 1880s, recalled: "In spite of the swishings I got, I liked the headmaster, Hornby, the perfectly mannered and sonorously-voiced old English gentleman. Handsome, alert, witty, a great athlete in his day, a good judge of wine, and the finest after-dinner speaker I ever listened to, with a charm of manner I have never forgotten." Hornby retired in 1884 to take the post of Provost of Eton and was succeeded by another Etonian and Balliol oarsman, Edmond Warre. Hornby had also become a Doctor of Civil Law and a Queen's Chaplain. As chairman of the Governing Body, he presided over the meetings at the time of Warre's resignation, when Edward Lyttelton was elected Warre's successor. He remained provost until his death in 1909, to be succeeded again by Warre.

== Personal life ==
Hornby married the daughter of J. C. Evans of Eton in 1859. She was associated with the whole of his headmastership at Eton until she died in 1891. He also lost one son, but others and two daughters survived him. He was the brother of Admiral of the Fleet Sir Geoffrey Hornby.

== See also ==
- List of Oxford University Boat Race crews

Academic offices
Preceded by Edward Balston	Head Master of Eton College; 1868–1884	Succeeded by Edmond Warre
Preceded by Charles Old Goodford	Provost of Eton; 1884–1909	Succeeded by Edmond Warre
