= Angus MacFarlane-Grieve =

British academic, mathematician, rower and British Army officer

Angus MacFarlane-Grieve MC TD

Master of University College, Durham
- In office 1939–1954
- Preceded by: J. H. How
- Succeeded by: Len Slater

Personal details
- Born: 11 May 1891
- Died: 2 August 1970 (aged 79)
- Education: The Perse School
- Alma mater: University College, Durham

Military service
- Allegiance: United Kingdom
- Branch/service: British Army
- Years of service: 1914–1923
- Rank: Major
- Unit: Highland Light Infantry
- Battles/wars: First World War
- Awards: Military Cross (1917); Silver Medal of Military Valor (Italy; 1917)

Alexander Angus MacFarlane-Grieve, MC, TD (11 May 1891 – 2 August 1970) was a British academic, mathematician, rower, and decorated British Army officer. He served with the Highland Light Infantry during World War I. He was Master of University College, Durham from 1939 to 1954, and additionally Master of Hatfield College, Durham from 1940 to 1949.

== Early life ==
MacFarlane-Grieve was born on 11 May 1891, and was baptised at St Mary Abbots, an Anglican church in Kensington, London. He was educated at The Perse School, a private school in Cambridge, England. He went on to study mathematics at University College, Durham, and graduated with a Bachelor of Arts (BA) degree in 1913. He rowed for both his college (University College Boat Club) and for the university (Durham University Boat Club). He was President of the DUBC during his final year, from 1912 to 1913.

== Military service ==
On 15 August 1914, having been a member of the Officer Training Corps while at university, MacFarlane-Grieve was commissioned into the 4th Battalion, The Highland Light Infantry, British Army, as a second lieutenant (on probation). In December 1914, his commission and rank were confirmed. In July 1915, he attended the Scottish Command School of Signalling at Peebles, Tweeddale, Scotland. He then became one of three officers commanding the 4th Battalion's signal section. By June 1917, he had been promoted to captain. By the end of the war, he held the acting rank of lieutenant colonel.

On 4 August 1923, he was transferred to the Regular Army Reserve of Officers (thereby ending his army career) and was promoted to major with seniority from 4 May 1922. While an academic at Durham, he was an officer of the Durham University contingent of the Officer Training Corps.

== Academic career ==
In 1923, having left the army, MacFarlane-Grieve returned to Durham University to become a lecturer in military subjects. Between 1923 and 1939, he was also Bursar of University College, Durham. In 1939, at the age of 47, he was appointed Master of University College. He was the first head of the college not to be not in Holy Orders: i.e. he was the first layman. With World War II causing a shrinkage in student numbers, he was additionally appointed acting Master of Hatfield College, Durham in 1940. He stood down from that acting appointment in 1949 and was succeeded by Eric Birley. From 1948 to 1953, he was Sub-Warden of the Durham Colleges and therefore the deputy of the Vice-Chancellor and Warden with specific responsibility for the Colleges of Durham University.

In 1953, MacFarlane-Grieve inherited the family estate at Edenhall, Scottish Borders, and retired early from Durham.

== Honours ==
In May 1917, MacFarlane-Grieve was awarded the Silver Medal of Military Valor by the King of Italy "for distinguished services rendered during the course of the campaign". In June 1917, he was awarded the Military Cross (MC) "for distinguished service in the field". In February 1932, he was awarded the Efficiency Decoration (TD) for long service.

Academic offices
Preceded by J. H. How	Master of University College, Durham; 1939 to 1954	Succeeded by Len Slater
Preceded by Arthur Robinson	Master of Hatfield College, Durham; 1940 to 1949	Succeeded by Eric Birley
