= Maurice Tucker =

British sedimentologist

- Born: Maurice Edwin Tucker; 6 November 1946 (age 80)
- Education: University College, Durham
- Scientific career
- Fields: Carbonate sedimentology
- Workplaces: Durham University; Newcastle University

Maurice Edwin Tucker (born 6 November 1946) is a British sedimentologist, specialising in the field of carbonate sedimentology, more commonly known as limestones. From 1993 to 2011 he held the position of Professor of Geological Sciences at the University of Durham, and from 1998 to 2011 was Master of University College, Durham.

== Education ==
Tucker graduated with a First Class Honours degree in geology from the University of Durham (University College, Durham) in 1968. This was followed by a PhD in sedimentology from the University of Reading in 1971.

== Career ==
Following lecturerships at the University of Sierra Leone and Cardiff University, he moved to Newcastle University in 1975. In 1982 he was appointed lecturer in geology at Durham University and became Reader in 1988. He was made a professor in 1993.

Tucker's research interests focus on the properties of sedimentary rocks, particularly limestones, their formation and usefulness as an oil reservoir. He has written or edited more than eight books, including the standard undergraduate text Sedimentary Petrology, and Carbonate Sedimentology.

He has served as President of the International Association of Sedimentologists and was awarded the prestigious Coke Medal of the Geological Society of London in 1994. He has also acted as the external examiner for the Earth Sciences degree at the University of Oxford.

In addition, he has served as Staff Treasurer for the Assassins' Guild of the University of Durham since the end of the 1990s.

== University College, Durham ==
Maurice Tucker was Master of University College, Durham from 1998 to 2011, and in the last formal dinner of the Easter Term 2010 his portrait by Andrew Ratcliffe was unveiled, to be hung in the Great Hall. The portrait features a fossil that he found at the age of 7 in the family back garden at Newbury Park, which began his fascination with geology. As an undergraduate student he himself was a member of the college between 1965 and 1968. He was awarded college colours for representing Castle at table tennis. He is well acquainted with the traditions of the students within the college, and is highly respected by Castlemen, with many of his youthful escapades spoken of as myth within college. In the Epiphany term of 2009 he took part in the Lumley Run, never having completed it as a student, completing it in 1 hour 22 minutes. While Master, he inhabited the entirety of the large house at the base of the Keep, along with his wife – regularly entertaining students in his garden in the summer months. He was known as being a staunch supporter of the JCR and MCR, and maintained a strong involvement with them. On the occasion of his retirement in the summer of 2011, the MCR renamed their common room (previously the William St Calais room) the Maurice E Tucker room in his honour.

Academic offices
Preceded by Edward Salthouse	Master of University College, Durham; 1998–2011	Succeeded by Eva Schumacher-Reid
