= Gareth Sibson =

British writer (born 1977)

Gareth J. H. Sibson (born 1977) is an English writer and broadcaster. His debut novel, Single White Failure was a frank look at relationships in London. The book drew on his own experiences of dating in London and analysed the women of a generation inspired by Bridget Jones and Sex and the City. Before becoming a writer and broadcaster, Sibson practised as a lawyer in The City. He comments on a variety of social and legal issues.

== Biography ==
=== Early life ===
Sibson originally hails from Holt, Norfolk, and continues to have strong ties to the county. Prior to university, Sibson was a Sir Peter Kirk scholar and remains actively involved with the Trust. He also worked as a pupil Attorney in Barbados at the Chambers of Mia Amor Mottley, head of the Barbados Labour Party. He went up to University College, Durham, to read law and later went on to qualify with the leading London law firm, Lovells. He specialised in property law but left private practice in 2005 to focus on his writing and broadcasting career.

At this time, Sibson was offered an apprenticeship with the enfant terrible of the journalist world, Toby Young (How To Lose Friends & Alienate People). During his time with Young, Sibson helped him stage the play Who’s The Daddy?, a sex farce about the David Blunkett/Kimberley Quinn scandal and the "Sextator" affairs of Boris Johnson and Rod Liddle. It was named Best New Comedy at the 2006 Theatregoers' Choice Awards.

=== Writer and broadcaster ===
At the end of 2005, Sibson's debut novel, Single White Failure, was published. He wrote the real-life story because he felt men were misrepresented in contemporary fiction. It was a thinking man’s retort to chick Lit such as Bridget Jones and Sex and the City. He wanted to write about real women and the things they do in relationships, writing against the popular myths that he saw in the media and elsewhere.

At the same time, he began the internationally successful blog ChasingBridget.com – his satirical quest to track down the perfect Bridget Jones. 15,000 women a day were logging on, claiming to be the real Bridget, from Birmingham to Bangalore. Reports on Sibson appeared around the globe.

Sibson is a media commentator. He appears on TV and radio with credits including NBC's Today Programme, Sky One's Taste, UKTV Style's How To Find a Husband. He has written for the Daily Mail and The Sun online and is often asked to comment on stories by the likes of The Sunday Times. He is also the resident relationships expert at Colourful Radio.

The Sunday Times dubbed Sibson "The Dr Dolittle of Relationships", and The Evening Standard said, "If you've lost your faith in men he might just restore it."

In 2008 and 2009, he opened the London Book Fair with fellow writers Joanna Trollope and Adele Parks.

He appears on radio talking about the book world, relationships, the modern woman and gender issues.

In the past, he has been involved with various TV production companies as a presenter. Most recently he has been involved with the BBC in developing a legal affairs program.

=== Personal ===
Sibson lives in South London. He has a passion for Regency architecture. He spends part of his time working for charities such as the educational trust, The Sir Peter Kirk Fund. He is also a supporter of the women’s charity The Fawcett Society.
