= Oliver Tress =

British businessman (born 1967)

CEO of Oliver Bonas
- Incumbent
- Assumed office 1993

Personal details
- Born: May 1967 (age 59) Oxfordshire, United Kingdom
- Spouse: Gina Coladangelo (m. 2009; div. sep. 2021)
- Children: 3
- Education: Marlborough College; Durham University
- Occupation: Businessman

Oliver James Mark Tress (born May 1967) is a British businessman and the founder and CEO of the retail chain Oliver Bonas, which he established in 1993.

== Early life ==
Tress was born in Oxfordshire in May 1967. He is the son of a banker father and housewife mother. He was educated at Marlborough College, after which he took a degree in anthropology at Durham University, graduating in 1989 as a member of Hatfield College.

== Career ==
Tress opened the first Oliver Bonas store on London's Fulham Road in 1993 selling handbags and jewellery from Hong Kong, where his parents lived, and products he sourced from trade shows. Tress used £3,000 of his savings to set up the first shop, £1,500 of which was set aside for the rent.

In 2011, during the London riots, he was "badly beaten by looters" outside an Oliver Bonas store on Battersea's Northcote Road, and received hospital treatment for head injuries.

In 2019, Tress obtained a £15m revolving credit facility from HSBC, which allowed Oliver Bonas to open eight more stores. By 2023 there were 83 Oliver Bonas stores in the UK.

== Personal life ==
Tress has attention deficit hyperactivity disorder, otherwise known as ADHD.

In 2009, he married Gina Coladangelo. Tress and Coladangelo have three children. In 2015, they moved from Clapham Junction to a five-bedroom Edwardian house in Wandsworth, London with a live-in nanny. The house was later bought by chef, Gordon Ramsay for an estimated £7.5 million. Coladangelo was a director and major stakeholder for the PR and lobbying firm Luther Pendragon, and the marketing and communications director for Oliver Bonas. Later she became a non-executive director at the Department of Health and Social Care, an aide to the then Secretary for Health and Social Care Matt Hancock. In June 2021, Hancock resigned after images were released showing him kissing and embracing Coladangelo in his Whitehall office breaking the then COVID-19 social distancing restrictions. It was later reported that they had separated from their spouses to form a relationship.
