= Oliver Bonas =

British design company

Oliver Bonas Limited
- Type: Private
- Industry: Clothing
- Founded: 1993; 33 years ago
- Founder: Oliver Tress
- Headquarters: United Kingdom
- Key people: Oliver Tress (Chief Executive Officer)
- Website: oliverbonas.com

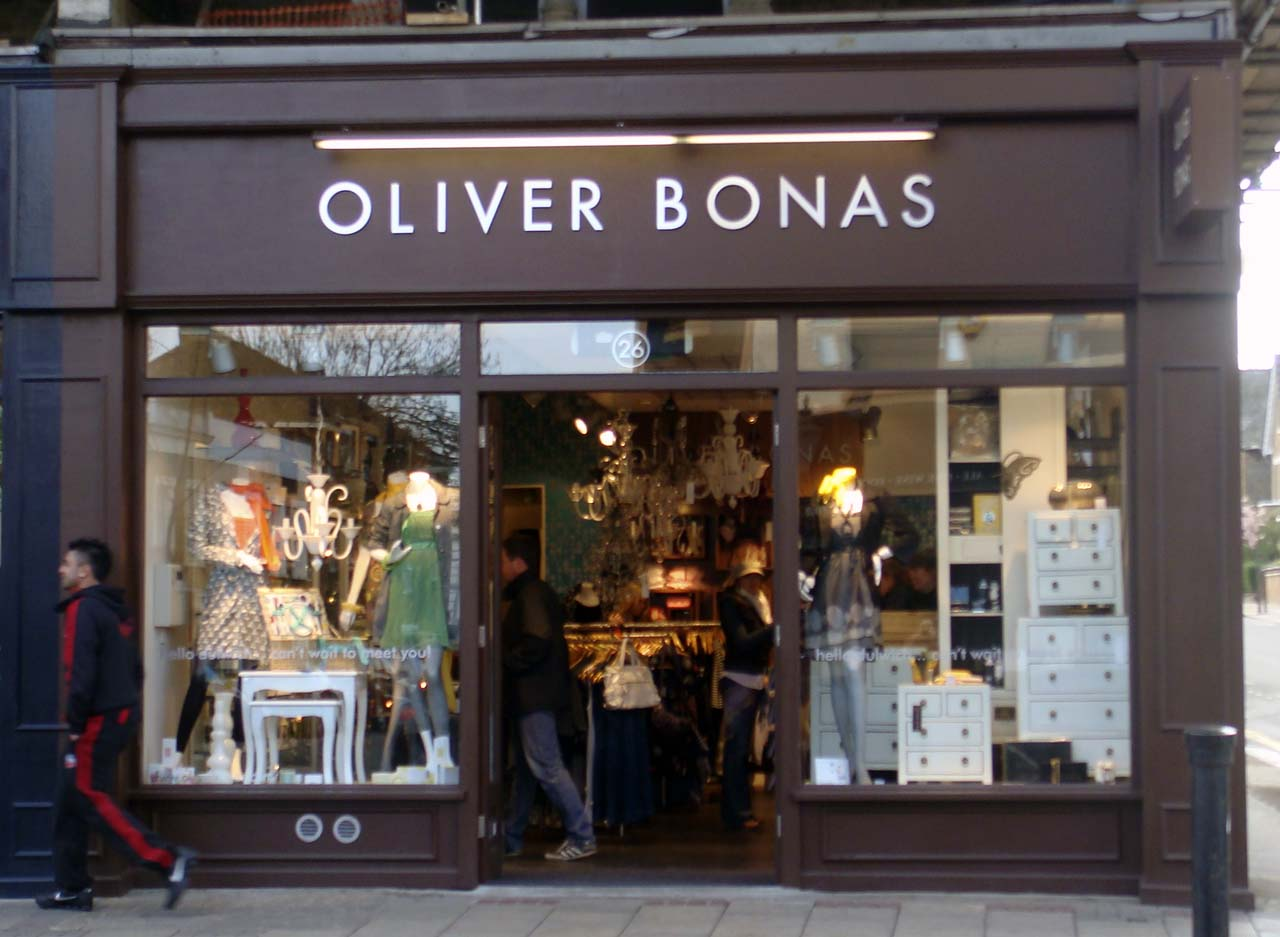
Oliver Bonas, Lordship Lane, East Dulwich, London in 2008

Oliver Bonas is a UK-based homeware and fashion chain. Founded in 1993 by Oliver Tress, as of 2023, there are 83 stores in the UK. Tress is the chief executive. It is headquartered in Chessington, South West London.

== History ==
In 1993, Oliver Tress, aged 25, opened the first Oliver Bonas store on Fulham Road in west London. He initially sourced products from trade shows around the country. On its first Saturday trading, the shop made £1,000 worth of sales.

The chain was named after Tress's then-girlfriend, Anna Bonas, the cousin of Prince Harry, Duke of Sussex's ex-girlfriend Cressida Bonas.

In June 2020, the chain secured £3.5 million of additional funding from HSBC as part of the Coronavirus Business Interruption Loan Scheme.

As of July 2023, Oliver Bonas has 1,500 employees and 83 shops across the UK and Ireland. Revenues were £92.8 million in the 2021 financial year and pre-tax profits came in at £7.5 million.
