= David Melville (priest) =

The Reverend David Melville
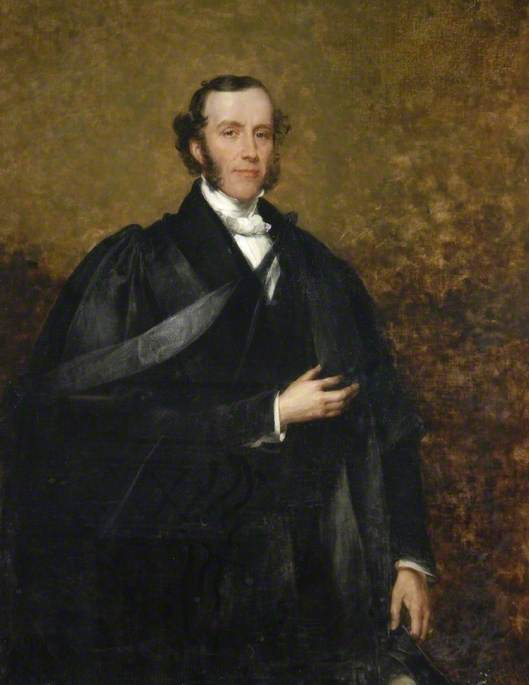
- Born: 5 February 1813; Bloomsbury, London, England
- Died: 8 March 1904 (aged 91); Worcester, Worcestershire, England
- Occupations: University don Cleric

Academic background
- Education: Shrewsbury School; Brasenose College, Oxford (MA)

David Melville, DD (5 February 1813 – 8 March 1904) was a Church of England priest and university administrator.

Educated initially at Shrewsbury School, he was subsequently awarded a scholarship to Brasenose College, Oxford, where after graduating he was ordained as a clergyman. He became a University don, and one of his scholars was William Ward, 1st Earl of Dudley. In 1846 he left Oxford and moved to Durham where he founded Bishop Hatfield's Hall. He was Canon of Worcester Cathedral until he resigned in late 1902.

He married Emma Hill at Kilcoo, County Down on 28 July 1848.

== Works ==
- The probable course of legislation on popular education, and the position of the church in regard to it (1868)
