= University College, Durham =

Constituent college of Durham University

University College
- University of Durham
- Durham Castle, University College

- Arms: Azure, a Cross patonce or, between four Lions rampant Argent, on a Chief of the last, the Cross of St Cuthbert Sable, between two Durham Mitres Gules.
- Location: The Castle, Palace Green, Durham DH1 3RW
- Coordinates: 54.775532°N 1.57616°W
- Latin name: Collegium Universitatis Dunelmensis
- Motto: Latin: Non nobis solum
- Motto in English: Not for ourselves alone
- Established: 1832; 194 years ago
- Principal: Wendy Powers
- Vice principal: Ellen Crabtree
- Chaplain: The Rev'd Dr Sam Hole
- Undergraduates: 698
- Postgraduates: 153
- Website: www.dur.ac.uk/university.college
- JCR: Karishma Sharma (Senior Student) www.castlejcr.co.uk
- MCR: Cam Reed (President) www.castlemcr.co.uk
- Boat club: University College Boat Club

Map
- Location within Durham, England

UNESCO World Heritage Site
- Part of: Durham Castle and Cathedral
- Criteria: Cultural: ii, iv, vi
- Reference: 370
- Inscription: 1986 (10th Session)

University College, informally known as Castle, is the oldest constituent college of Durham University in England. Centred on Durham Castle on Palace Green, it was founded in 1832 by William van Mildert, Bishop of Durham. As a constituent college of Durham University, it is listed as a higher education institution under section 216 of the Education Reform Act 1988. Almost all academic activities, such as research and tutoring, occur at a university level.

University College moved into its current location in 1837. Around 150 students are accommodated within Durham Castle. Other college buildings, including converted 18th century houses and purpose-built accommodation from the 1950s, 1970s and 1980s, are within five minutes' walk of the castle. The college has 700 undergraduates and is currently the most over-subscribed college of the university. In 1987 it admitted women undergraduates for the first time, having previously been an all-male college.

University College fosters a traditional atmosphere, encouraging its members to attend formal dinner which happens fortnightly. Formals take place in the great hall, consisting of a three-course dinner for which gowns are required dress. Students must also recite grace in Latin and must not stand until both a senior member of the JCR and the MCR have bowed to the high table. The MCR typically hosts a subsequent Port & Cheese event for their members following the formal. Castle also hosts the June Ball, a white-tie event as part of the end of examination celebrations. The MCR hosts their own Charity Ball in the month of June.

From January 2012 until March 2019 the Master of the college was political theorist David Held. Wendy Powers joined as the college Principal on 1 June 2020.

== History ==
=== Early years ===
University College was formed upon the creation of University of Durham in 1832. It was the first college of the university, and is therefore known as the "foundation college", but the university was founded explicitly on the Oxbridge model; the intention was already for the university to develop along collegiate lines in the manner of Oxford and Cambridge, as it has.

Previously, for centuries, Durham Castle had been the bishop's palace for the Bishop of Durham until the residence was moved to Auckland Castle in 1832. Bishop William van Mildert, one of the founders of the university, had intended for the castle to be given to the college. Temporary accommodation for students was provided at the Archdeacon's Inn (now known as Cosin's Hall) on Palace Green until University College moved into its permanent home in 1837 after van Mildert's successor, Edward Maltby, completed renovations of the Castle.

The castle's keep, formerly a ruin, was redeveloped for student accommodation; in particular, the college's chapels and Great Hall have been restored. Since then high levels of maintenance have been, and still are, necessary to preserve the buildings of the castle.

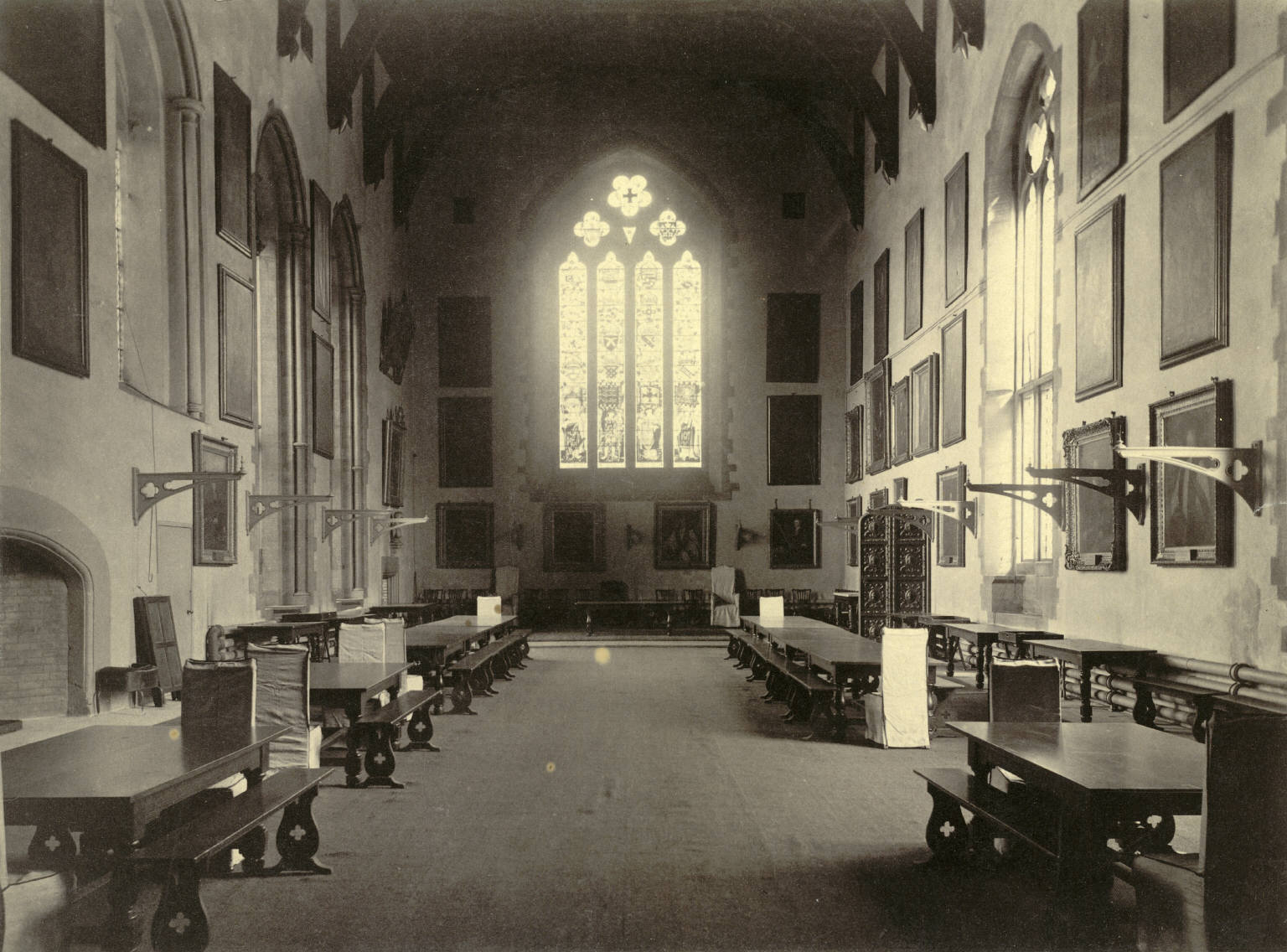
The Great Hall of University College in the late 19th century

The university's second college, Hatfield Hall, was formed in 1846 as a response to the high costs of maintaining Castle. These costs arose from the students' expectations of being provided with servants and room furnishings.

The university struggled for the rest of the 19th century, held back by a lack of prestige and a distance from the centres of power in the UK. By 1882, Castle contained some 79 undergraduates out of 205 at the university as a whole. Despite the university largely failing to gain recognition and prestige, a number of other colleges had opened by the end of the nineteenth century. Of these, Bishop Cosin's Hall failed to become financially viable and was absorbed into University College in 1864. Enrolment numbers continued to fluctuate.

=== 1919–38 ===
The inter-war years were transformative for Castle. The college was the smallest in Durham university, with just 34 undergraduates in 1928, and was struggling to meet maintenance costs. The Castle, situated on the banks of "The Peninsula", was in danger of collapsing into the River Wear and many of its internal structures were weak. The combination of high costs and low undergraduate numbers meant that the college was often threatened with closure or merger with Hatfield. Castle was saved largely through charitable donations. A visit in the 1920s from Edward, Prince of Wales (later Edward VIII), helped increase the profile of the cause. In the 1920s, the castle's foundations were secured through reinforcement with concrete. Following these and other extensive building refurbishments of the 1920s and 1930s the college was now able to expand.

=== Post-war ===
One of its most successful periods followed during the Second World War when personnel of the Durham University Air Squadron were posted in the castle, doing short courses before joining the Royal Air Force. Those from the college who died during World War II were commemorated by the redevelopment of the Norman Gallery area of the Castle in the 1950s. This period also saw the launch of Castellum, an annual journal of the Castle Society, created to keep former students in touch with college life. In order to continue this expansion, the college purchased Lumley Castle in 1946 to house students, and by 1948 seventy five students were housed there. This section of the college developed a spirit of its own and is still remembered today through activities such as the Lumley Run.

The Tunstall Chapel

During the 1950s and 1960s the college expanded through developments at Owengate (later renovated in 2014) and Bailey Court, both around Palace Green. In the 1970s, the college's lease of Lumley Castle ended. Moatside Court was instead developed, and meant that all the college's students were now housed within five minutes of the main castle. During this period there was rapid change in the size and structure of the college, which expanded to over 300 undergraduates by 1979.

The Keep as seen from Palace Green

Female students were admitted to the college for the first time in 1987; until then it had been single sex. Since this time the college has become fully mixed, with undergraduate numbers expanding to nearly seven hundred. Expansion caused a strain on college numbers, however, and in 2004 the college was unable to provide accommodation for all of its fresher students for the first time in its history. Following the foundation of Josephine Butler in 2006, Durham's first new college to be opened since 1972, pressure from the university to take on additional students lessened, and undergraduate numbers were intentionally reduced in the following years. In line with the wider UK expansion of the higher education sector, the college expanded again in the 2010s, with the opening of a new self catered site in Durham City centre at Kepier Court.

== College traditions ==
=== College arms ===
Although it had been in use before this period, the college arms were officially granted by the College of Arms on 29 May 1912, on the occasion of the eightieth anniversary since the founding of the college by the Bishop of Durham in 1832. The arms are blazoned: Azure, a Cross patonce or, between four Lions rampant Argent, on a Chief of the last, the Cross of St Cuthbert Sable, between two Durham Mitres Gules. The blue field with the gold cross and four lions are the arms of the Diocese of Durham, the mitres represent the Bishop and St. Cuthbert's cross is included as Durham Cathedral is dedicated to, and is the resting place of St. Cuthbert. Underneath is the motto, in Latin, "Non nobis solum", meaning "Not for ourselves alone". It is derived from a sentence quoting Plato in Cicero's most influential philosophical work, his treatise De Officiis (On Duties).

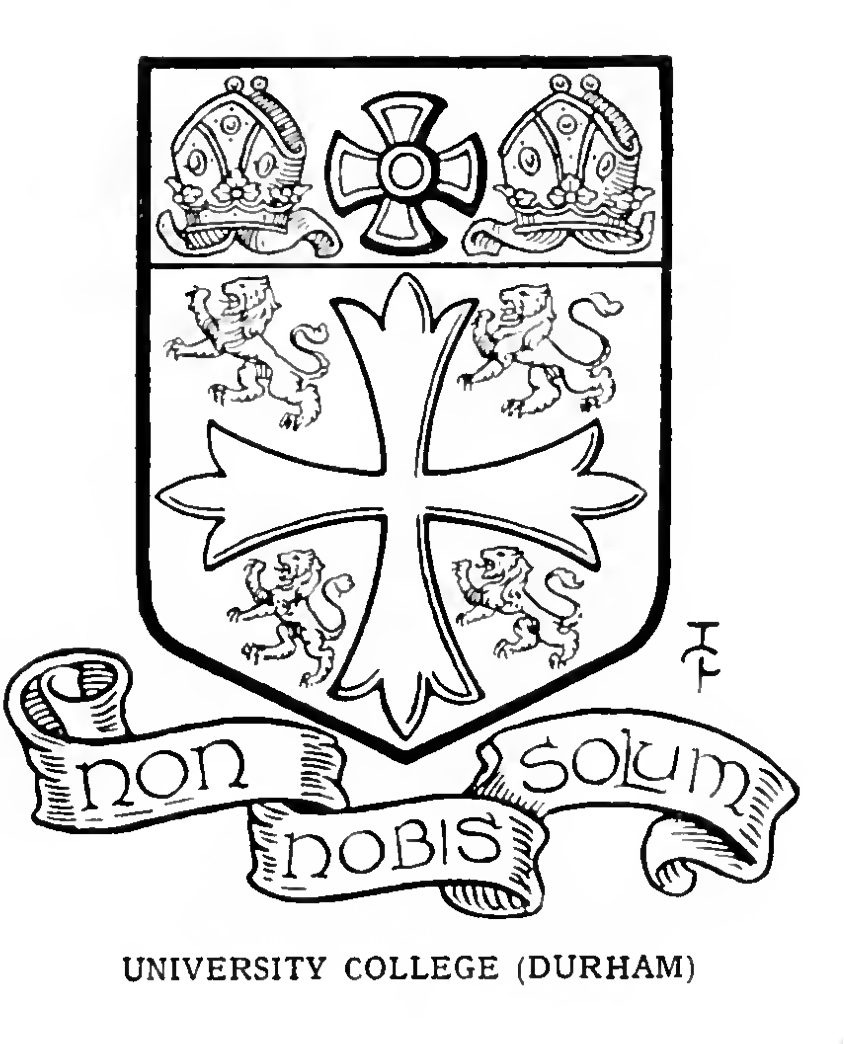
Arms of University College, Durham, as published in 1915 by Arthur Charles Fox-Davies.

=== Grace ===
Before being served at formal hall, once a fortnight during term-time, students recite the following Latin grace, led by a senior member of the JCR. Although the origin of the grace is officially unknown, an almost identical version was in use at the time as a post-prandial grace by Westminster School.

Domine omnipotens, aeterne Deus; qui tam benigne nos pascere hoc tempore dignatus es; largire nobis, ut tibi semper pro tua in nos bonitate ex animo gratias agamus; vitam honeste et pie transigamus; et studia ea sectemur quae gloriam tuam illustrare et ecclesiae tuae adiumenta esse possint; per Christum dominum nostrum. Amen.

Translated into English, it reads as follows:

Almighty Lord, eternal God; who hast so graciously deigned to feed us at this time; grant to us, that we may ever give Thee heartfelt thanks for Thy goodness to us; that we may pass our lives honourably and piously; and that we may follow such pursuits as can shed light on Thy glory and afford assistance to Thy church; through Christ our Lord. Amen.

== Buildings and architecture ==
Construction of Durham Castle began in 1072, which makes it the oldest building in use at any University in the world. The castle retains much of its original design and structure, and is part of a UNESCO World Heritage Site with Durham Cathedral.

Durham Castle as seen from the central tower of the cathedral.

To the east of the courtyard lies the Keep. It was re-built in the 1840 by Anthony Salvin, having previously lain in ruins. This area has the largest concentration of students living in the castle. To the south of the courtyard is the Gatehouse, built originally by Hugh de Puiset in the 12th century and re-developed in the sixteenth and eighteenth centuries. Around this are the college's more modern offices.

The college's other buildings are at Moatside Court, Owengate and Bailey Court. The developments at Moatside Court and Bailey Court date from the 1960s and 1970s, whilst Owengate was formed from a series of old houses in the 1950s. Of these, Moatside Court's rooms were of a notoriously poor quality, but were renovated in 2006 at the cost of over £1 million. Moatside now contains a gym and kitchens on every floor.

The Castle's Great Hall in 2026

=== Great Hall ===
To the west of the courtyard is the medieval Great Hall, still used as a dining room by students and staff. It was built during the time of Anthony Bek in the 13th century. For two hundred years this was the largest Great Hall in Great Britain; however, it was shortened by Richard Foxe. It still stands some 14 m (46 ft) high and 30 m (98 ft) long. The black staircase that leads from the Great Hall to the Senior Common Room dates from 1662, and is another of the older sections of the college still in use. Underneath the Hall is the college bar, located in an 11th-century undercroft. Around these are student accommodation, the Lowe Library, and kitchens. The Victorian minstrel's gallery at the southern end of the hall is now used a student study space.

Detail of a stall in the Tunstall chapel

=== Chapels ===
The castle's North Range originally contained a dining hall, but this was later divided up to make more luxurious quarters for the Prince Bishop. This area contains the Bishop's Dining Room and Chaplain's Suite, which is currently home to the Senior Common Room, and is also home to the two chapels of the college (University College is one of two colleges in Durham to have two chapels, the other being Hild Bede). The Norman Chapel dates from the 11th century and is the oldest accessible part of the castle, and retains its original Saxon architectural style. The Tunstall Chapel is the larger of the two; it dates from the 15th century and is named after Cuthbert Tunstall. Both chapels are used for worship within the college.

College services take place twice a week during term time, led by the Chaplain, assisted by officers of the chapels (namely, the Sacristan and Director of Music). Said Eucharist is celebrated on Sundays in the Norman Chapel at 17:00, or in the Tunstall Chapel when sung on various feast days.

The college chapel choir is composed of sixteen choral scholars and two organ scholars. Its primary role is to supplement worship, singing weekly evensong on Thursdays and eucharist on certain Sundays. The choir also has extensive extra-collegiate commitments, including singing the grace before certain formals, evensongs in Durham Cathedral and tours both in the UK and abroad every summer. The choir has also recorded CD albums, most recently in April 2025 with Convivium Records. The organ in the Tunstall Chapel, a Harrison, takes its case from the lower part of the old 17th-century cathedral organ and is played by the organ scholars in services.

=== Lowe Library ===
The Lowe Library is the college's library. It was formed from a bequest from Colonel W.D.Lowe, an officer of the Durham University Officers' Training Corps. He later became a Classics tutor at the university and rowing coach for University College, staying until his death in 1921. The library was opened in 1925, extended into the college's wine cellar in 1997, and now contains over 10,000 books. Spread over three floors, it acts as a support to the central university library, providing access to core textbooks.

== Masters ==
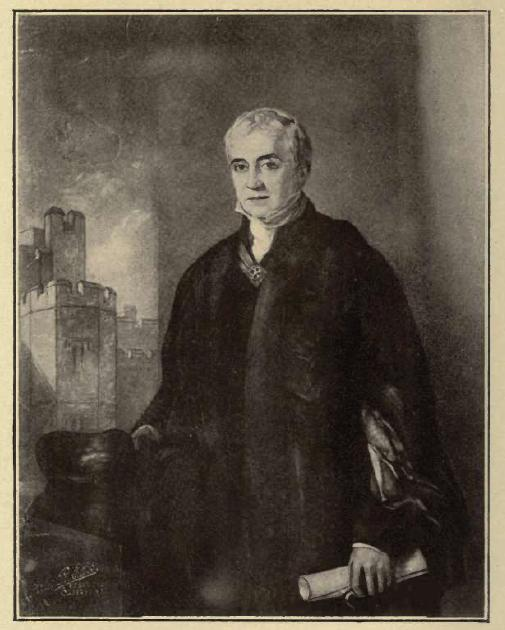
Painting of Archdeacon Charles Thorp in the Great Hall of University College, Durham.

The college is formerly headed by a "Master", since 2020 titled principal, which is the most senior position in the SCR. As the first master of University College, Archdeacon Charles Thorp, also held the post of university warden. Following Thorp's death in 1862 the mastership was created as a separate position. All past Masters have their portrait hanging in the Great Hall or SCR ante-room.

=== List of Masters ===
- Charles Thorp 1832–1862
- Joseph Waite 1865–1873
- Herbert Booth 1873–1875
- Alfred Plummer 1875–1902
- Henry Gee 1902–1919
- Henry Ellershaw 1919–1930
- J. H. How 1930–1939
- Angus Macfarlane-Grieve 1939–1954
- Len Slater 1954–1973
- D. W. McDowall 1973–1978
- Edward Salthouse 1979–1998
- Maurice Tucker 1998–2011
- Eva Schumacher-Reid (acting) 2011
- David Held 2012–2019
- Richard Lawrie (acting) 2019
- Graham Towl (acting) 2019
- Wendy Powers 2020–present

== Role and activities ==
University College is the most over-subscribed college at the university; for entry in 2006, there were 2,858 applications for 170 places (approximately 17 applicants for every place). As with all colleges at Durham, students study for degrees with Durham University, not their college, and teaching takes place in academic departments. University College is a "listed body" under the Education Reform Act (1988).

Although colleges are largely concerned with welfare, leisure and accommodation, University College has been running the 'Durham Castle Lecture Series' since 2012. Past speakers have included Saskia Sassen, Gayatri Chakravorty Spivak, Rowan Williams, Anthony Giddens, Justin Welby, Martin Wolf, Noam Chomsky and Peter Singer.

Within Durham's colleges, there is a strong competitive rivalry. Castle's main rival is Hatfield College, which is Durham's second oldest college, having separated from Castle in the 1850s. The rivalry is maintained by student pranks and tricks and in various intercollegiate sporting events.

The college has a commercial arm, taking advantage of the attractive nature of the college's buildings. It hosts corporate events, conferences and weddings during the university vacations.

The Castle is open to tourists only via guided tours. These occur daily outside of term time, but are more restricted during the term due to potential conflicts with the running of the college. Furthermore, events in the university timetable may result in their cancellation. Tourists are not otherwise permitted entry to the college or any common areas. There is relatively little conflict between students and tourists, with many of the guided tours done by students themselves.

=== Formals ===
Students are expected to wear smart attire and gowns during Formals, which take place fortnightly (having previously been on both Tuesdays and Thursdays) in the Great Hall. All those attending the formal must stand when the High Table enters, when grace is being said or sung, and when the Senior Student is bowing out. Complete silence is observed during these periods. Following grace, there is no standing throughout the formal until the Senior Student has bowed out to the Master, a symbol of the official opening or closing of the formal meal.

== Student body ==
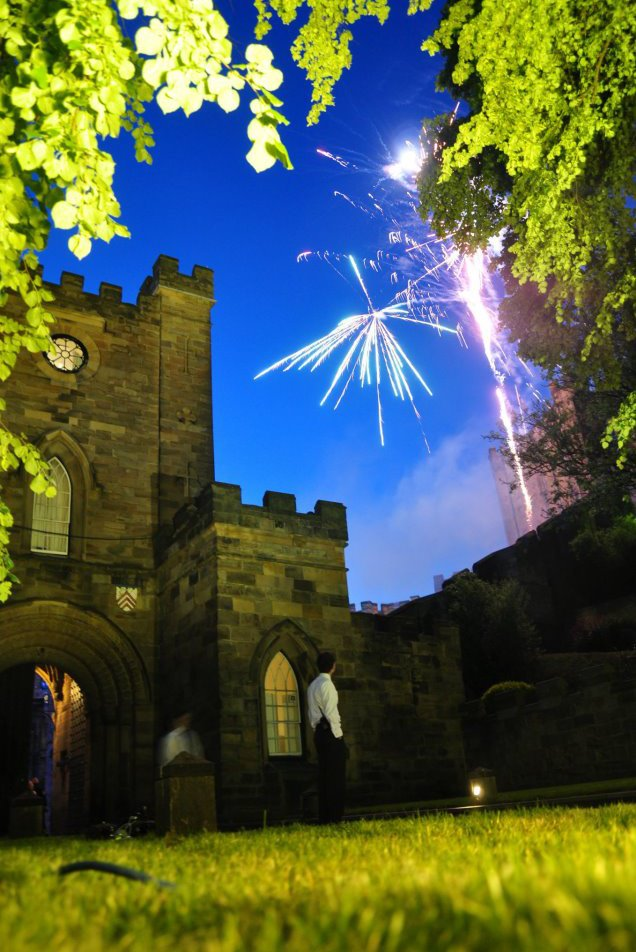
June Ball Fireworks, 19 June 2012

Some 700 undergraduates attend Castle, making it slightly smaller than the average Durham college. Of these students, around 100 live in the castle itself, while another 250 are housed in the college's surrounding buildings. It remains the most popular college in Durham for applications, with around 27 students applying for every available place.

The undergraduate student body (Junior Common Room or JCR) is governed by an elected Executive Committee headed by the Senior Student and supported by several other officers. Regular JCR meetings are held to discuss and vote on important issues. There are several other elected non-executive officers such as Returning Officer, Fresher Rep and Sports Captain who organise other important college functions. The Senior Student meets regularly with college and university authorities to represent the JCR.

The JCR runs three balls every year for its students, with one held during each term. The largest is the end of year June Ball, which is the social highlight of the academic year. Tradition dictates that its theme remains closely hidden until the doors to the Castle open.

The graduate community at Castle forms the Middle Common Room (MCR), which is based in the Maurice Tucker (previously William de St-Calais) Room. However, due to size restrictions, no members of the MCR are currently able to live in the college grounds. The MCR, like the JCR, organises a number of social events and activities, such as the college's entry into the inter-collegiate University Challenge competition, which acts as trials for the university's team. The Senior Common Room (SCR), is an organisation of academics and tutors connected to the college. The SCR also organises formal meals with guest speakers.

The student bar of University College is called the Undercroft Bar (known colloquially as The Undie), due to its location in an 11th-century Undercroft. It developed from the original Junior Common Room, which opened in the early 1950s. It is currently run by the Food and Beverage Services Manager with the help of several JCR members. In 2018 a new college café replaced the Toastie Bar in the West Courtyard.

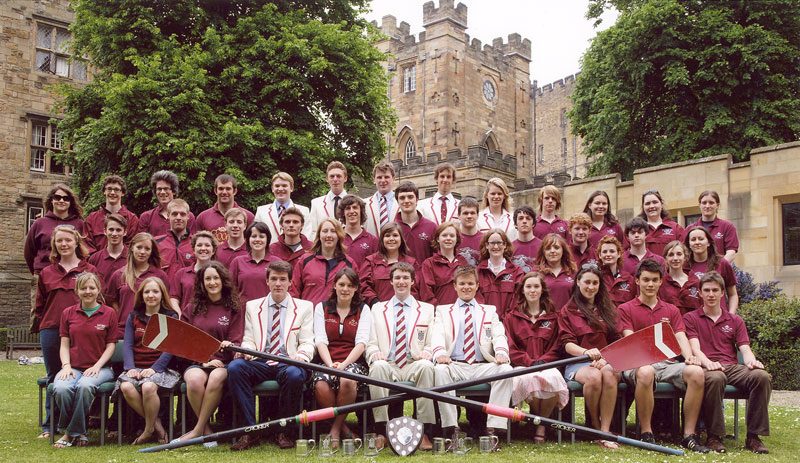
The college boat club UCBC is a popular student society and has previously qualified to race at Henley Royal Regatta.

=== Societies ===
University College JCR also supports many societies run exclusively for Castle students. The most popular societies include University College Boat Club (UCBC), Castle Theatre Company, Mixed Lacrosse, Castle Rugby Club, Castle Football Club, and Castle Hockey Club.

There are a number of arts societies within the college. Most notable is Castle Theatre Company, which produces a play each term. These plays are usually performed on the college's grounds, although they sometimes tour nationally. They have also appeared at the Edinburgh Festival Fringe.

== Castle Society ==
The Castle Society was formed in 1947 by Castle Alumni. It was originally named the Durham Castleman's Society. Membership is open to anyone with academic ties to the college, and its aim is to create a wider Castle community beyond its immediate students. The society makes regular donations to the college library, chapel, student bursaries, and various college societies. It has helped fund a number of projects in the college, including the accommodation at Moatside Court and Fellows Garden, as well as the West Courtyard Common Room. The Castle Society produces the annual journal "Castellum", which chronicles life at the Castle and reports on activities of Castle alumni. Since 1990, it has contributed towards the University College Durham Trust, the college's charitable fund.

== Notable alumni ==
Castle alumni are active through organisations and events such as the two annual reunion dinners, which cater for the more than 7,000 living alumni. A number of Castle alumni have made significant contributions in the fields of government, law, science, academia, business, arts, journalism, and athletics, among others.

Walter Adams, Archbishop of Yukon.

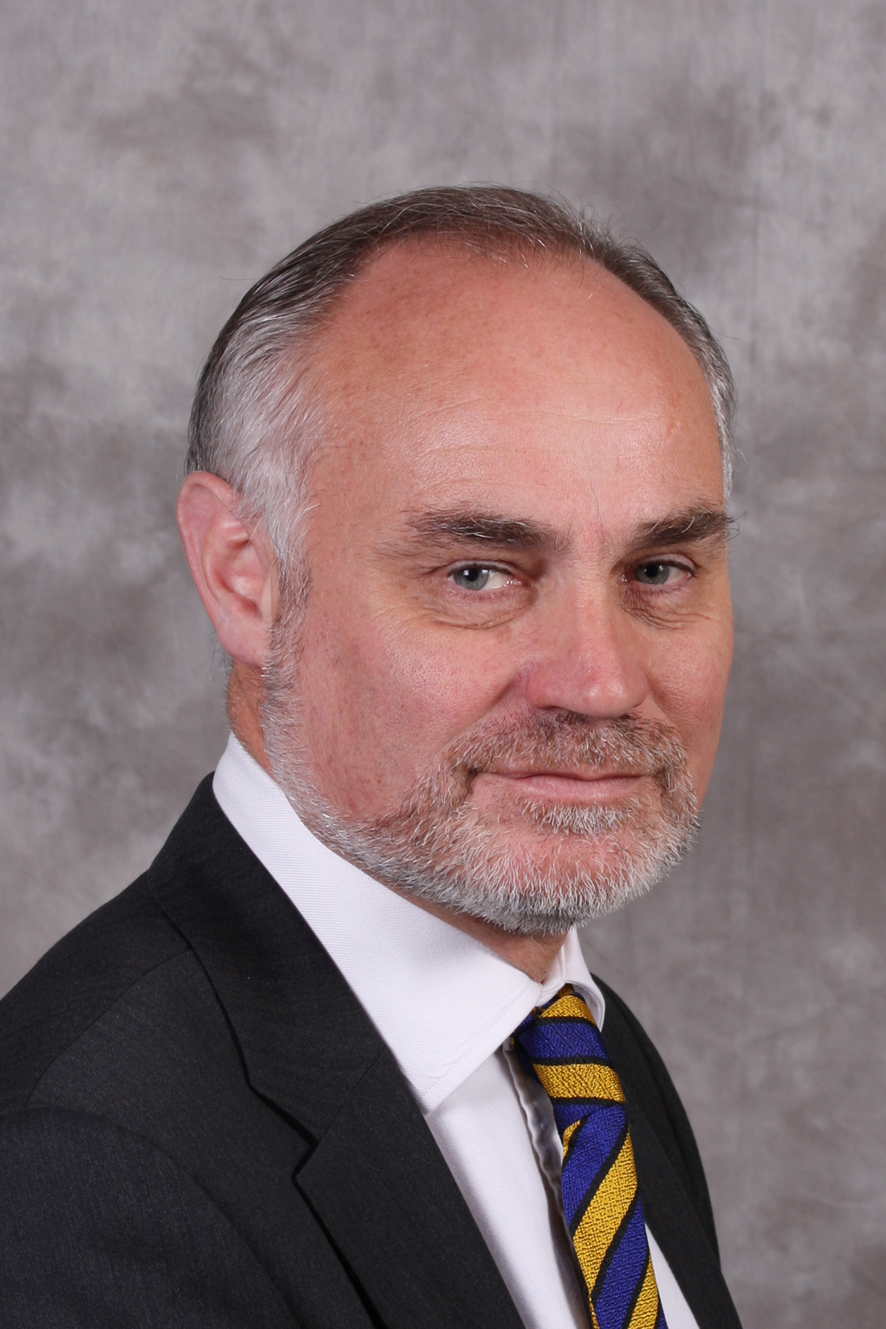
Crispin Blunt, Conservative MP for Reigate, Surrey.

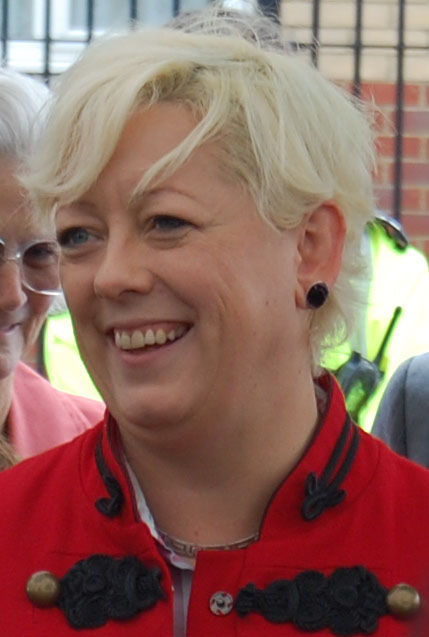
Jackie Doyle-Price, Conservative MP for Thurrock.

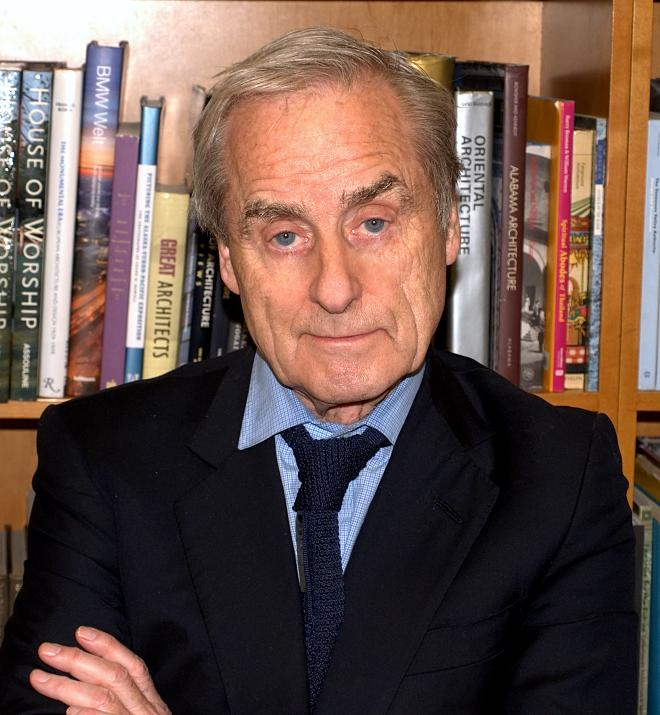
Sir Harold Evans, journalist and writer who was editor of The Sunday Times from 1967 to 1981.

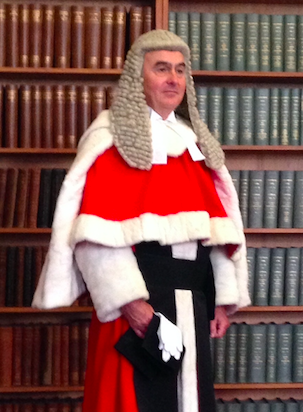
Sir James Goss, Justice of the High Court.

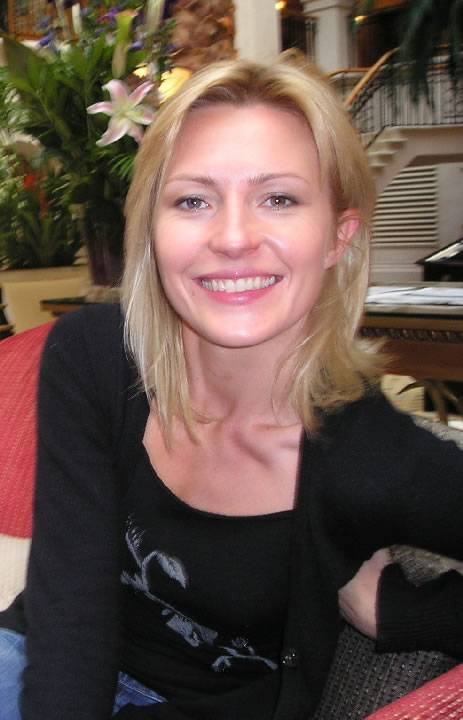
Helen Grace, English actress.

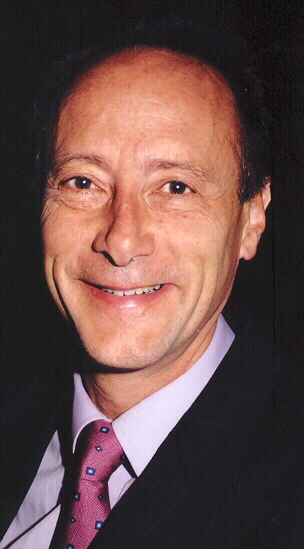
Piers Merchant was a British Conservative Party politician.

Stephen Warner, one of Britain's leading evangelists, and rector of Holy Trinity, Eastbourne.

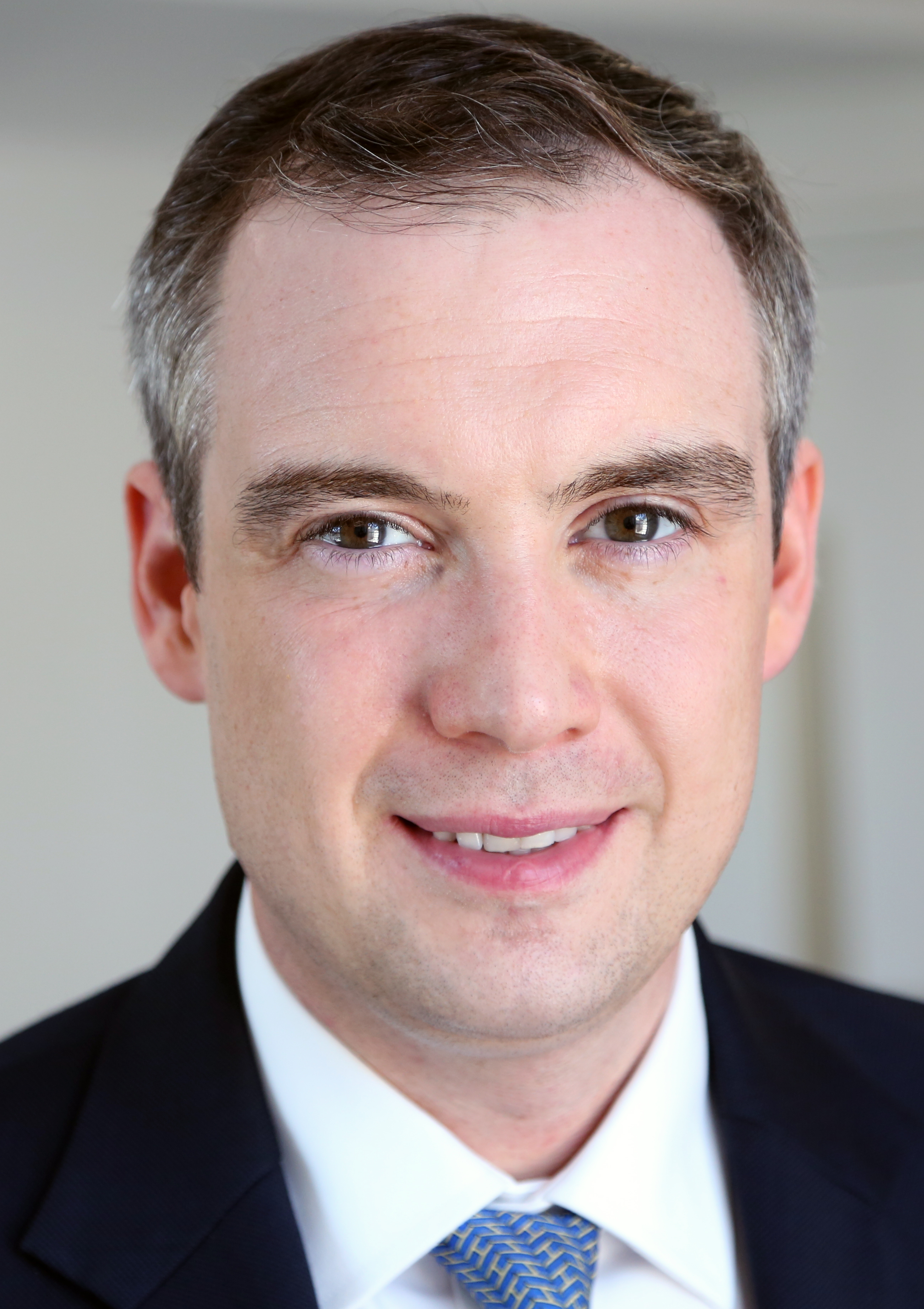
James Wharton, former Conservative MP for Stockton South.

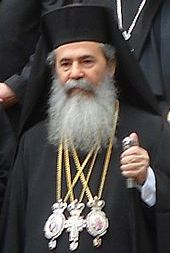
Theophilos III of Jerusalem, current Patriarch of the Orthodox Church of Jerusalem

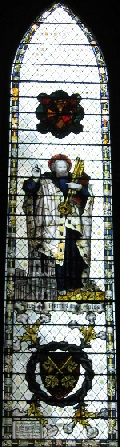
The Robert William Bilton Hornby window in York Minster, dedicated to a Castle alumnus.

Name	Degree (Graduated)	Career	Ref
Walter Adams	Mathematics	Former Archbishop of Yukon (1947–1952)	
Edward Bairstow	BA Music (1894), Doctor of Music (1901)	Composer and Organist of York Minster	
Assistant Commissioner Rob Beckley		Former Senior Man of the JCR. Assistant Commissioner in the Met Police, who led the investigation into the Hillsborough Disaster during Operation Resolve	
Crispin Blunt	Politics (1984)		
Edward Bradley		Novelist and clergyman known by the pen-name Cuthbert M. Bede	
George Malcolm Brown	Geology (1950)	Fellow of the Royal Society, former Director of the British Geological Survey	
Tim Crane	Philosophy (1984)	Philosopher	
Hunter Davies	Arts	Author, journalist and broadcaster	
Jackie Doyle-Price	Economics	Conservative MP for Thurrock and Junior Minister in the Department of Health	
George Entwistle	Philosophy and Politics (1983)	Journalist, TV producer and former Director-General of the BBC	
Harold Evans	BA Politics and Economics, MA	Journalist, writer and former editor of The Sunday Times	
Christopher Foster		Bishop of Portsmouth	
Phil de Glanville	Economics (1990)	Former captain of the England national rugby union team	
Roger Goodman	BA	Warden of St Antony's College, Oxford	
Sir James Goss	Law (1974)	Justice of the High Court (Queen's Bench Division)	
Helen Grace	Psychology (1992)	Actress	
William Greenwell	BA (1839), MA Theology (1843)	Fellow of the Royal Society, archaeologist, bursar of Castle (1844–1847), canon at Durham Cathedral	
Guillaume V, Grand Duke of Luxembourg		Grand Duke of Luxembourg	
George Hills		The first bishop of the Diocese of British Columbia	
Robert Hornby	BA (1841), LTh (1842), MA, BD (1852), DD (1856)	Antiquarian and priest at York Minster	
Walsham How		First Bishop of Wakefield	
Simon Hughes	BA	Writer, cricket analyst and former Middlesex and Durham bowler	
Sir John Lawton		President of The Institution of Environmental Sciences and recipient of the Japan Prize	
Sir Timothy Laurence	BSc Geography	Husband of Princess Anne and son-in-law of Elizabeth II	
Edward Leigh	History	Conservative MP for Gainsborough and Chairman of the Public Accounts Committee	
Rachel McCarthy	Physics and Chemistry	Scientist, poet, critic and broadcaster	
Piers Merchant		Former MP for Newcastle upon Tyne Central and "Senior Man" of the college JCR	
Huw Merriman		Conservative MP	
Gareth Sibson	Law	Writer and broadcaster	
Joseph Stevenson		Catholic archivist	
Henry Villiers-Stuart		Soldier, clergyman, author and Liberal Member of Parliament for County Waterford	
Stephen Warner	Classics	Rector of Holy Trinity, Eastbourne	
James Wharton	Law	Solicitor and the youngest Conservative MP in the House of Commons (MP for Stockton South, elected 2010)	

== Gallery ==
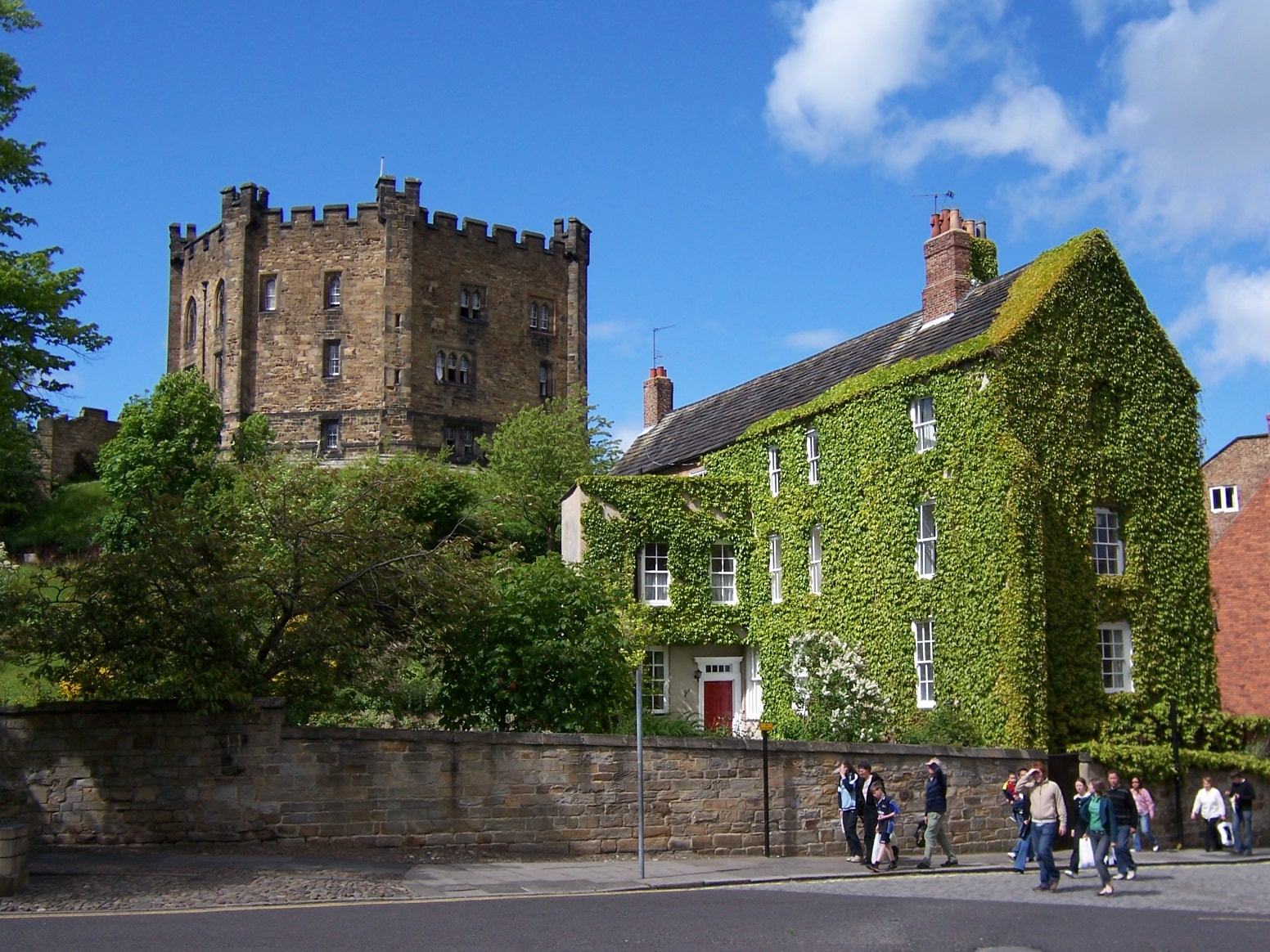
The Keep of Durham Castle - where some students are accommodated - as seen from the street.

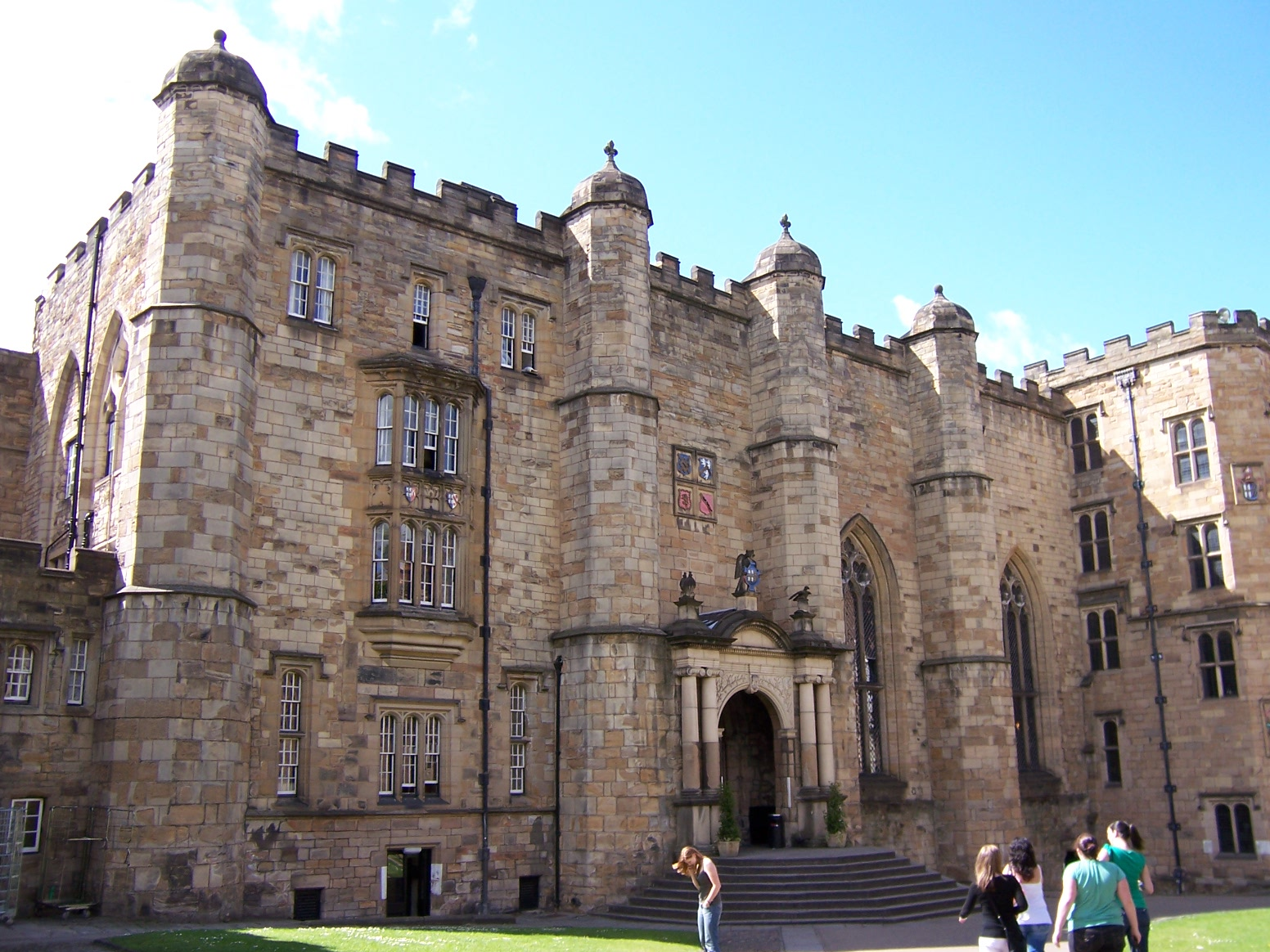
The main entrance to the college from the courtyard.

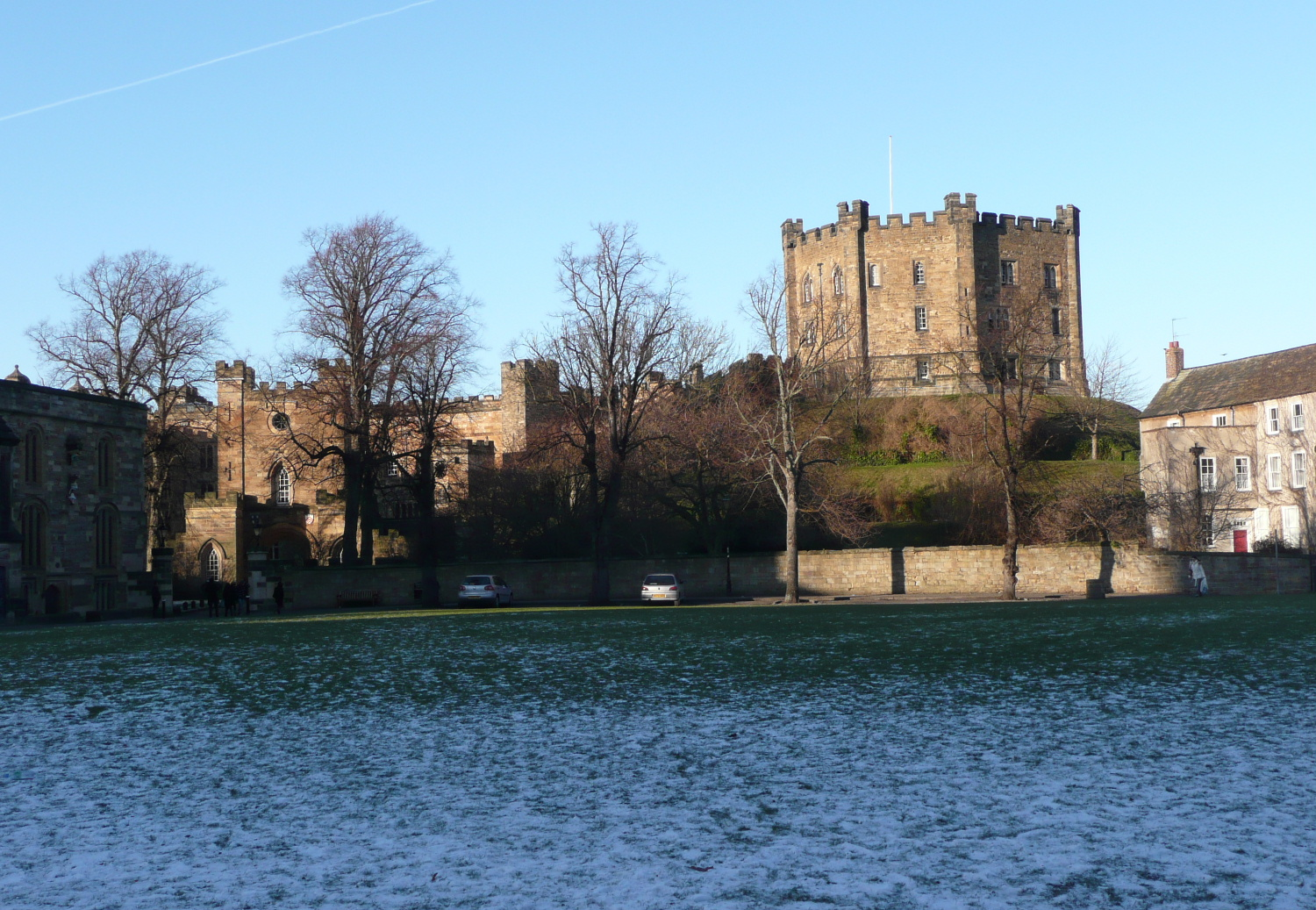
University College as seen from Durham Cathedral in winter.

Durham Gatehouse, the main entrance to the college from Palace Green.

The Northern wing.

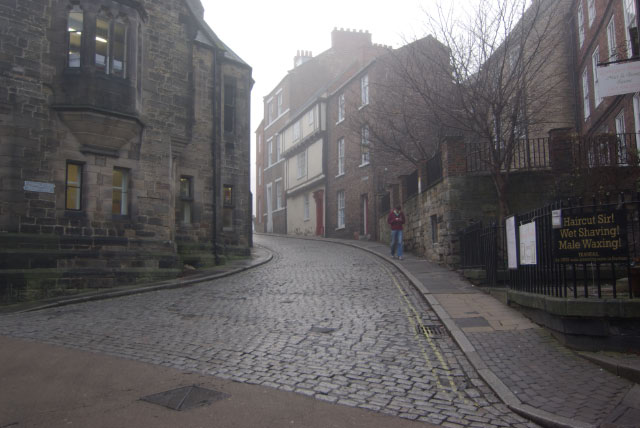
Houses in Owengate, the oldest of which dates back to the 16th century. They are now used as student accommodation.

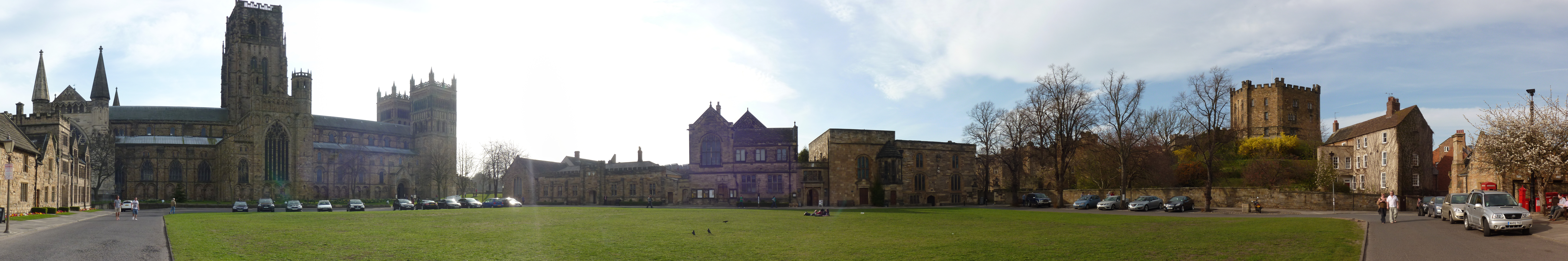
Panoramic view of Palace Green, showing Durham Cathedral to the left, the old University Library in centre, and University College and Owengate to the right.
