= The Bailey =

Street in Durham, England

Coordinates: 54°46′22″N 1°34′31″W

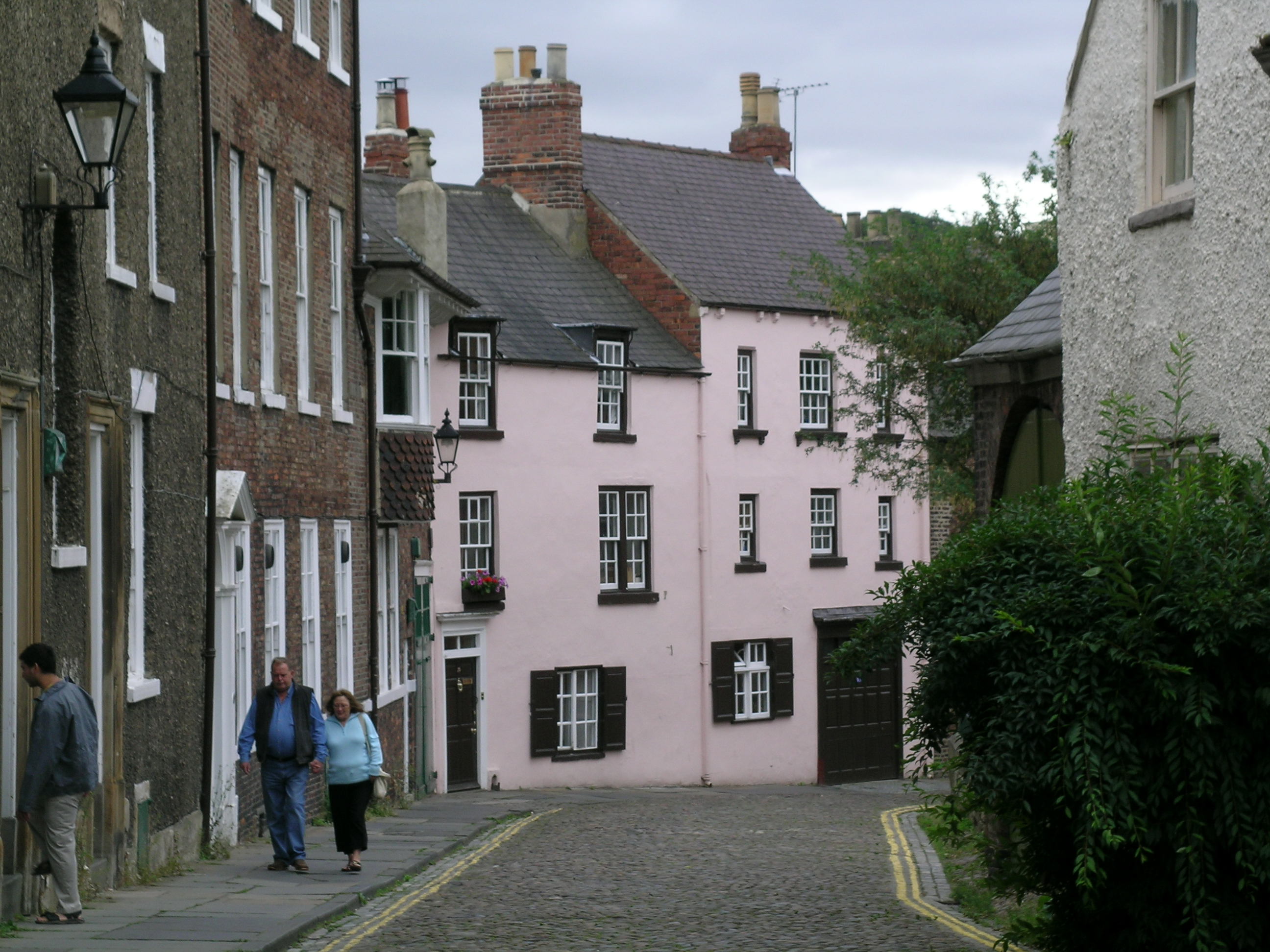
South Bailey, including parts of St John's College and St Cuthbert's Society

The Bailey is a historic area in the centre of the city of Durham, County Durham, England. It consists of two streets, North Bailey and South Bailey. It is on a peninsula within a sharp meander along the River Wear, formed by an isostatic adjustment of the land. The name "The Bailey" derives from the outer bailey of the Norman motte and bailey-style Durham Castle. Vehicular access to the area is restricted by the Durham City congestion charge, which started in 2002 and is the UK's oldest such scheme.

== Terminology ==
The area within the bend of the river, that is, the historic Durham Castle and Cathedral, Palace Green, North Bailey, South Bailey, Saddler Street, Durham Market Place and other surrounding streets is known as "The Peninsula", and forms one of the character areas of the Durham City Conservation Area. The five Durham University colleges in this area (University College, Hatfield College, St Chad's College, St John's College and St Cuthbert's Society) are often labelled Bailey Colleges, although only four of these are actually on the bailey, with University College being on Palace Green.

== Description ==
=== North and South Bailey ===
South Bailey

South Bailey begins close to St Cuthbert's Society, near to Prebends Bridge, at the southern tip of the peninsula. It is cobbled and flanked by numerous old buildings, many of which are owned by the Cathedral and University. Running northwards, South Bailey first passes by St John's College before turning into North Bailey at the gate into the College, an enclosed square containing the houses of the Cathedral's Dean and Canons as well as the Chorister School. North Bailey continues and is flanked by Hatfield College, St Chad's College, as well as numerous university subject departments. Some of these buildings are more modern in origin. The North Bailey ends at its junction with Owengate, which leads up onto Palace Green.

=== Palace Green and Durham Castle and Cathedral ===
Palace Green is an area of grass flanked by Durham Cathedral and Durham Castle. The Cathedral and Castle together form a UNESCO World Heritage Site. Although initially not part of the site itself, Palace Green was added to the UNESCO site in 2008. It is situated on top of the narrow, high peninsula formed by a sharp bend in the River Wear. To the east are Durham University buildings including the law, theology, classics and history departments, with the music department and the university's special collections library to the west.

From the north and east Palace Green is accessed by Owengate and Dun Cow Lane, the latter taking its name from a local legend involving a milkmaid and her cow. From the west, a passageway called "Windy Gap", leads down to the banks of the River Wear between two buildings which are now part of the university Music School.

=== Durham Market Place ===
The remainder of the peninsula is centred around Durham Market Place. Saddler Street is borne out of Owengate and North Bailey, continuing downhill to the Market Place. Elvet Bridge leads over to Elvet, the eastern part of Durham city centre, and is now pedestrianised. The Market Place itself is centred on a statue of Lord Londonderry. Saddler Street enters at its south-east corner, whilst Silver Street falls away to the south-west towards Framwellgate Bridge. St Nicholas' Church, Durham lies to the north of the Market Place, alongside the exit from Durham's Congestion Charge Zone onto Claypath. The dual carriageway A690 forms a northern border to the peninsula area.

== History ==
With steep cliffs and the River Wear on three sides, Durham's peninsula has long been recognised as a prime defensive site. A fortress was first established there in 1072, with the present keep being built in the 14th century.

In the Middle Ages the whole peninsula was known as "the castle" and was enclosed by a wall. Parts of the wall can still be seen in the grounds of the Bailey colleges of Durham University and to the west of the Cathedral; these walls are Grade I listed. Along the inside of the wall on the east side ran a street. This road still exists and forms the present North and South Bailey.

The central and southern parts of the peninsula, including the Castle, the Cathedral, the College, and Prebends Bridge, are now designated a World Heritage Site.

== See also ==
- Durham Cathedral
- Durham Castle and Cathedral
- Palace Green
- Durham Cathedral College
