= Palace Green (disambiguation) =

Palace Green is a grassed area in the centre of Durham, County Durham, England.

Palace Green may also refer to:

- Palace Green, Kensington, a street in London
- Palace Green, a grassed area in the centre of Ely, Cambridgeshire, England
- Palace Green, a grassed area in the centre of Colonial Williamsburg, Virginia, US
