= Durham Cathedral College =

Cathedral close in Durham, United Kingdom

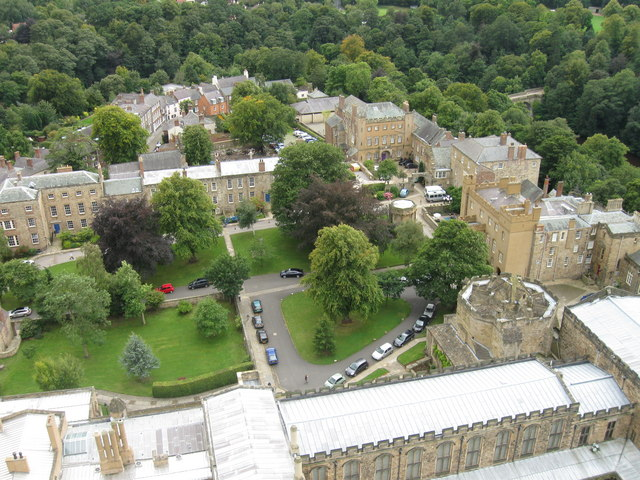
- Aerial, partial view of the college

- Location within Durham, England
- 54.7723°N 1.5768°W
- Type: Cathedral close
- Location: Durham, County Durham

Site notes
- Owner: Durham Cathedral

Listed Building – Grade I
- Official name: The Gatehouse
- Designated: 6 May 1952
- Reference no.: 1159471

Listed Building – Grade I
- Official name: 8, The College
- Designated: 6 May 1952
- Reference no.: 1120691

Listed Building – Grade I
- Official name: 12-15, The College
- Designated: 6 May 1952
- Reference no.: 1120694

Listed Building – Grade II*
- Official name: 6, The College
- Designated: 6 May 1952
- Reference no.: 1120690

Listed Building – Grade II*
- Official name: 7, The College
- Designated: 6 May 1952
- Reference no.: 1311001

Listed Building – Grade II*
- Official name: 16 and 16A, The College
- Designated: 6 May 1952
- Reference no.: 1120656

Durham Cathedral College forms a close to the south of Durham Cathedral in the city of Durham, England. It is part of the Durham Castle and Cathedral UNESCO World Heritage Site. The college was begun in the late 11th century as an outer courtyard to the monastic foundation established at Durham in 995, and is among the best preserved medieval monasteries in England. On the Dissolution of the Monasteries the college was repurposed to provide accommodation for the dean and 12 canons. Much of the original building fabric remains, although re-fashioning of the exteriors in the 18th and 19th centuries gives the college a Georgian appearance. Many of the buildings have historic listing designations.

== History ==
The first church at Durham was founded in 995, by monks fleeing from Viking attacks on their original home at Lindisfarne Priory. The present building was begun by William de St-Calais, appointed by William the Conqueror as Bishop of Durham in 1080. To support the monks, the area of the college was developed as an outer courtyard, housing a range of buildings including the prior's lodgings, an infirmary, an exchequer, a brewhouse, and accommodation for visitors (the Guests Hall). Entry to the college was through a fortified gatehouse. This was rebuilt in the late 15th or early 16th centuries by Prior Castell. (Note: Prior Castell was also responsible for the construction of the astronomical clock in the cathedral.)

On the Dissolution of the monasteries in the 1530s, the monastic church was reconstituted as a cathedral and governance was devolved to a dean and chapter. The college was repurposed to provide accommodation for the dean and for the twelve canons of the chapter, each of whom was also allocated a stall in the cathedral choir.

In the 18th and 19th centuries many of the building façades were remodelled, to suit prevailing fashions and tastes. An example is the main block of the Chorister School, which, while retaining much medieval fabric, was substantially altered by Dr. Theophilus Pickering in the very early 18th century, and then almost completely rebuilt at the beginning of the 19th century. Martin Roberts, in his County Durham volume in the Pevsner Buildings of England series, revised and reissued in 2021, suggests that the architect for the 19th century work was William Atkinson who undertook much work in the north of England. The buildings are faced with Roman cement, a type of natural cement developed by James Parker, a variant of which Atkinson is also known to have produced. The style of the reconstruction is a blend of Neoclassical with Tudor Revival fenestration and castellation. Atkinson was certainly responsible for the very similar work carried out at No. 12, part of the range Nos. 12-15, which also deploys Roman cement, and a very similar style of Gothick castellation.

In the 21st century the college remains home to a number of clergy connected to the cathedral. The deanery is the residence of the dean; excluding episcopal palaces, it is the largest official residency in the Church of England. The college also accommodates a number of administrative offices, including the chapter office, parts of the cathedral library, and the Chorister preparatory school, now part of the Durham Cathedral Schools Foundation.

The college forms part of the Durham Castle and Cathedral UNESCO World Heritage Site.

== Architecture and description ==
The college's northern border is formed by the cloisters of the cathedral, to the west by the River Wear, and to the east and south by the South Bailey. It comprises a rough rectangle, with a green at its centre. On the green stands the Conduit House and another water pipe. The latter is late 18th/early 19th century in date, but the former has 17th century origins, although it was given Gothick detailing in the mid-18th century, possibly by Sanderson Miller. Remodelling of the exteriors in the 18th and 19th centuries has given the college a Georgian appearance, but much of the original medieval fabric remains. Roberts calls it "one of the most architecturally rewarding places in the county". Many of the buildings now occupied as houses had their origins as ancillary support buildings for the medieval priory. Examples include Nos. 1 and 2, originally a storage building; No. 4, which began its life as a threshing barn; No. 7, which formed part of the granary; and No. 15 which was originally the infirmary. The deanery also had an earlier existence as a medieval ecclesiastical court. It now forms the largest official residence in the Church of England, excluding episcopal palaces. In 1974, a series of "highly important" murals were uncovered at the deanery, depicting the Joys of the Virgin.

=== Listing designations ===
Most of the buildings which form the college have historic listing designations. Those listed at the highest grade, Grade I, include: the gatehouse, the deanery, the priory kitchen, the main block of the Chorister School, No.8, Nos. 12-15, and the former prison and stables to the north of No.15. Buildings listed at the next highest grade, Grade II*, include: the secondary block of the Chorister School, and four houses; No. 6, No. 7, No. 16 and No. 16A.

19 structures are listed Grade II: a number of ancillary buildings; four energy/water supply features including the Conduit House; the office of the Chapter Clerk; and the university Department of Palaeography; and ten houses, or walls or gates associated with them.

== Gallery ==
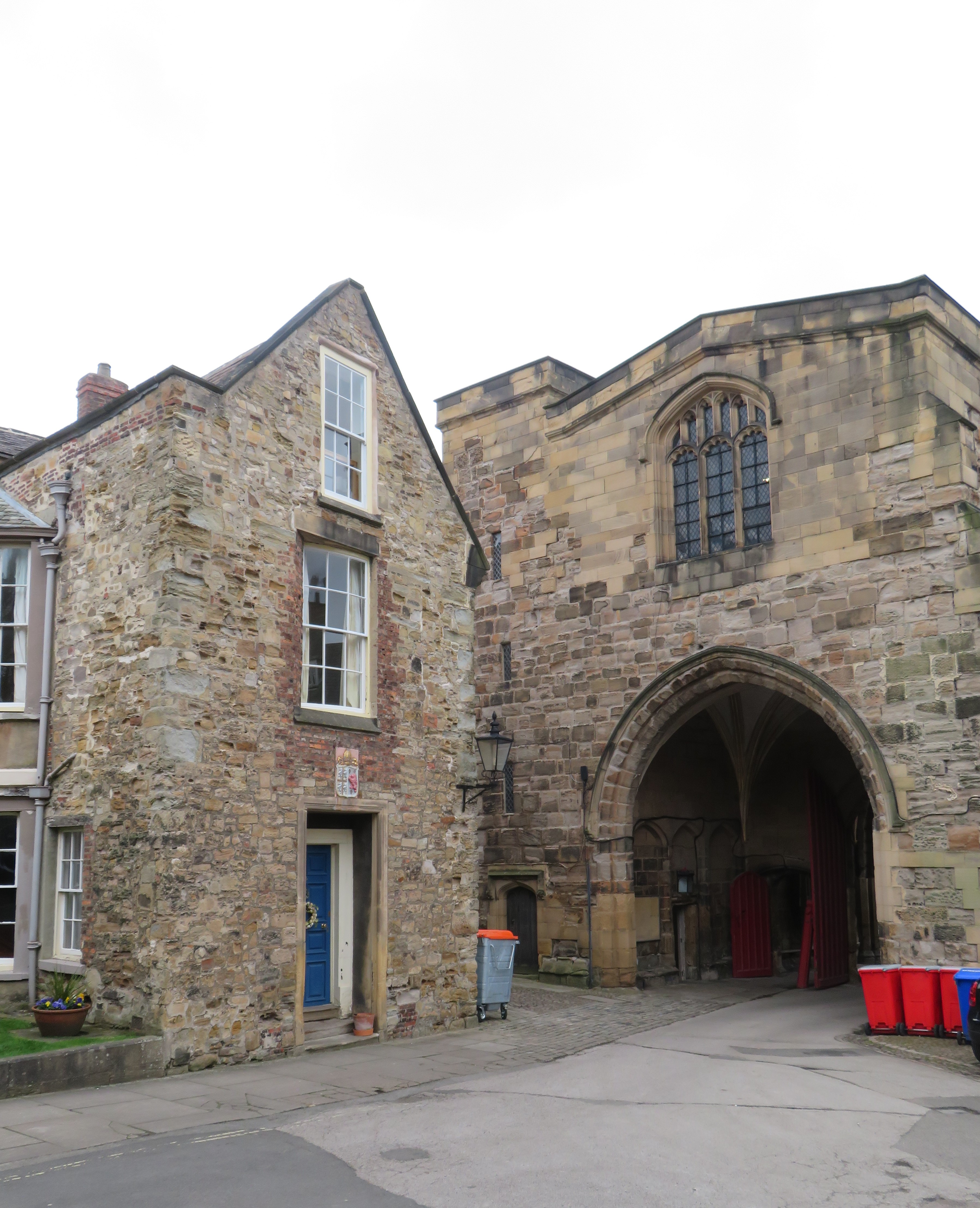
The gatehouse

Conduit House on the green

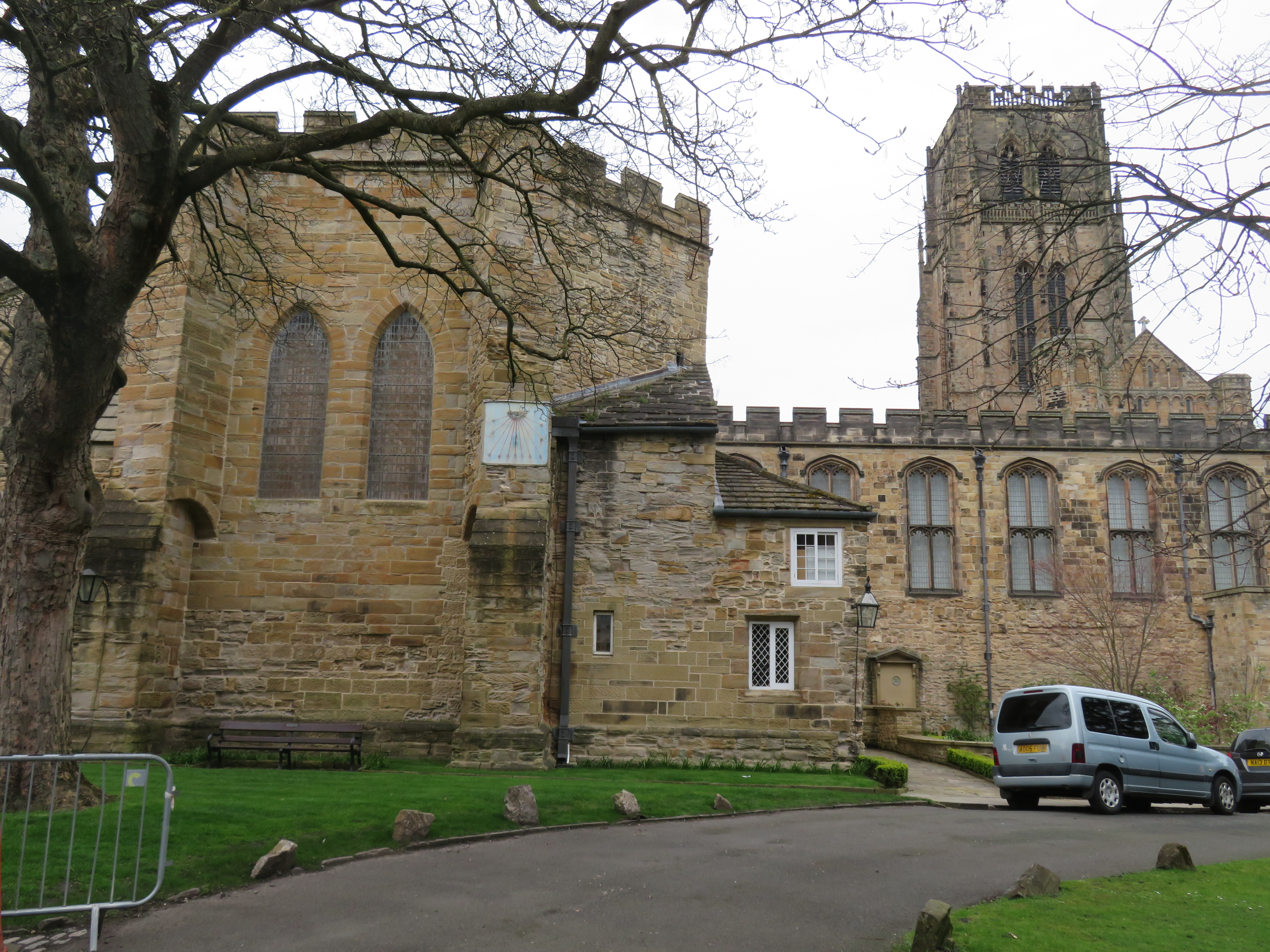
Priors' Kitchen, now the Muniment Room

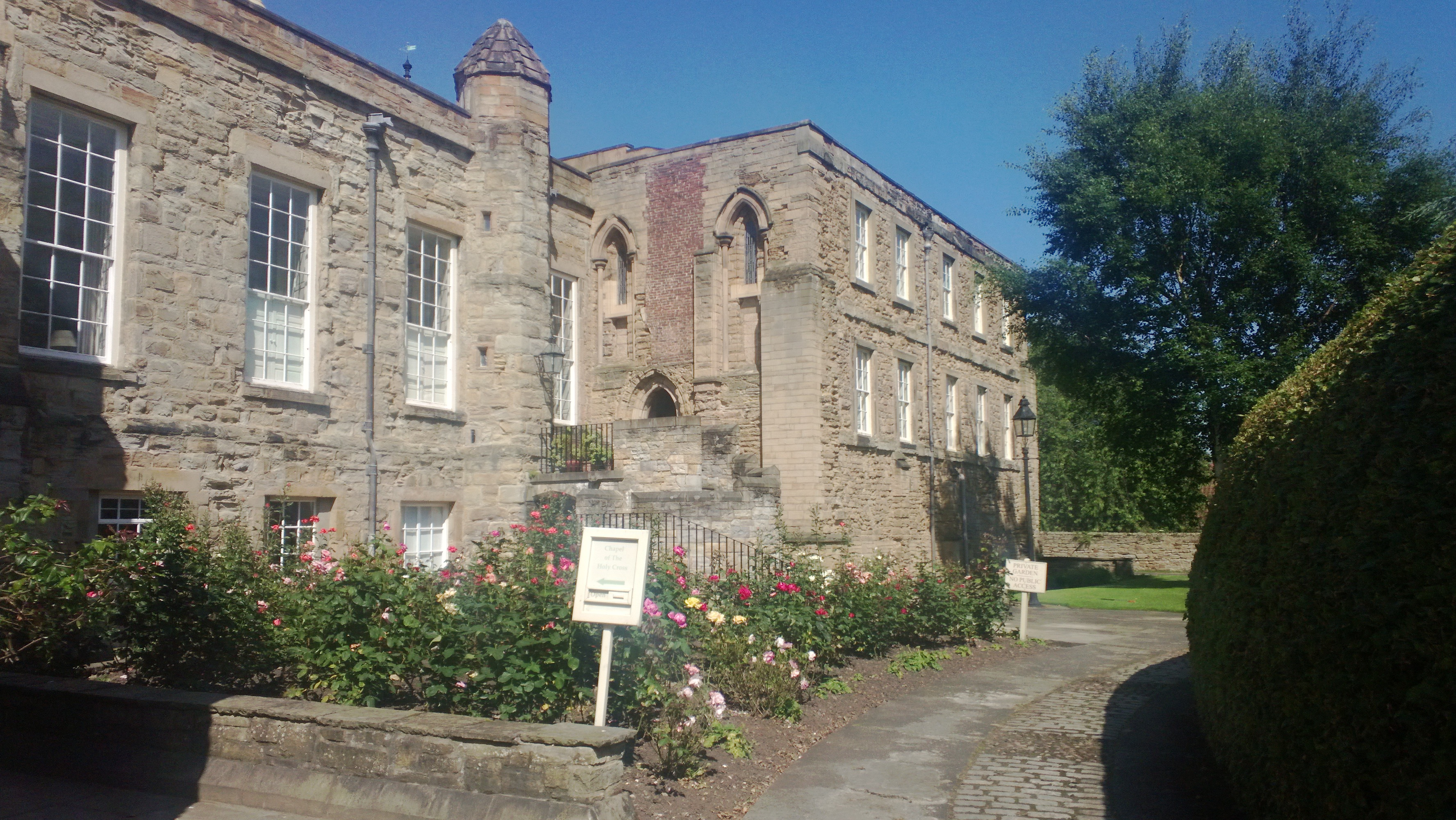
The Deanery

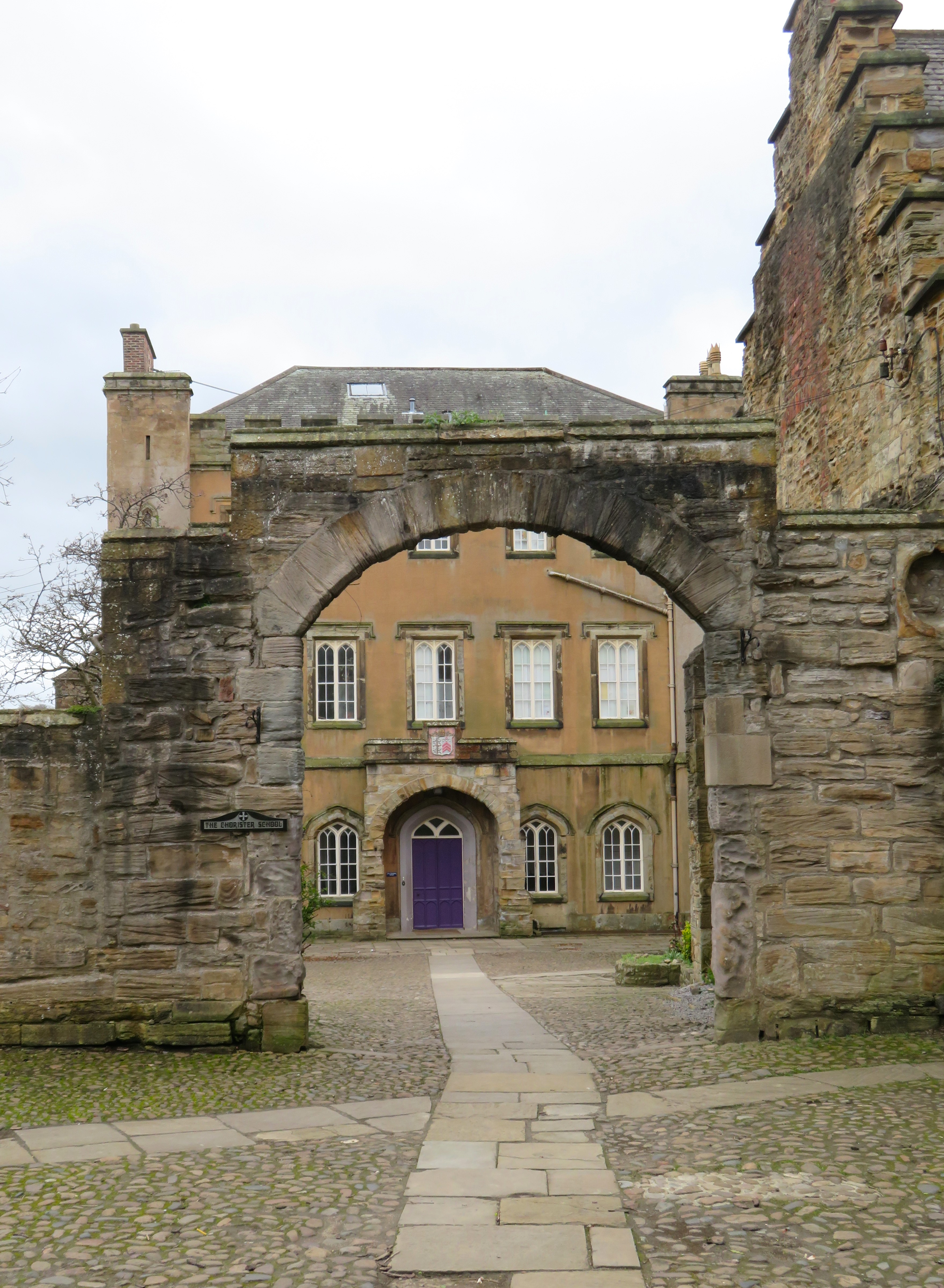
Medieval archway to the Chorister School

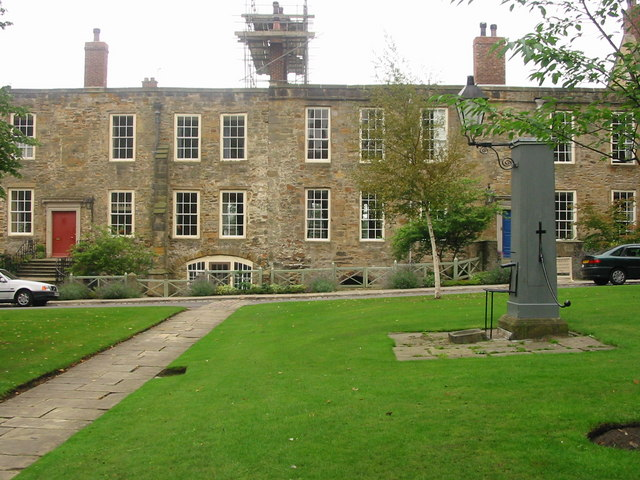
No.s 6 and 7, and water pump on the green

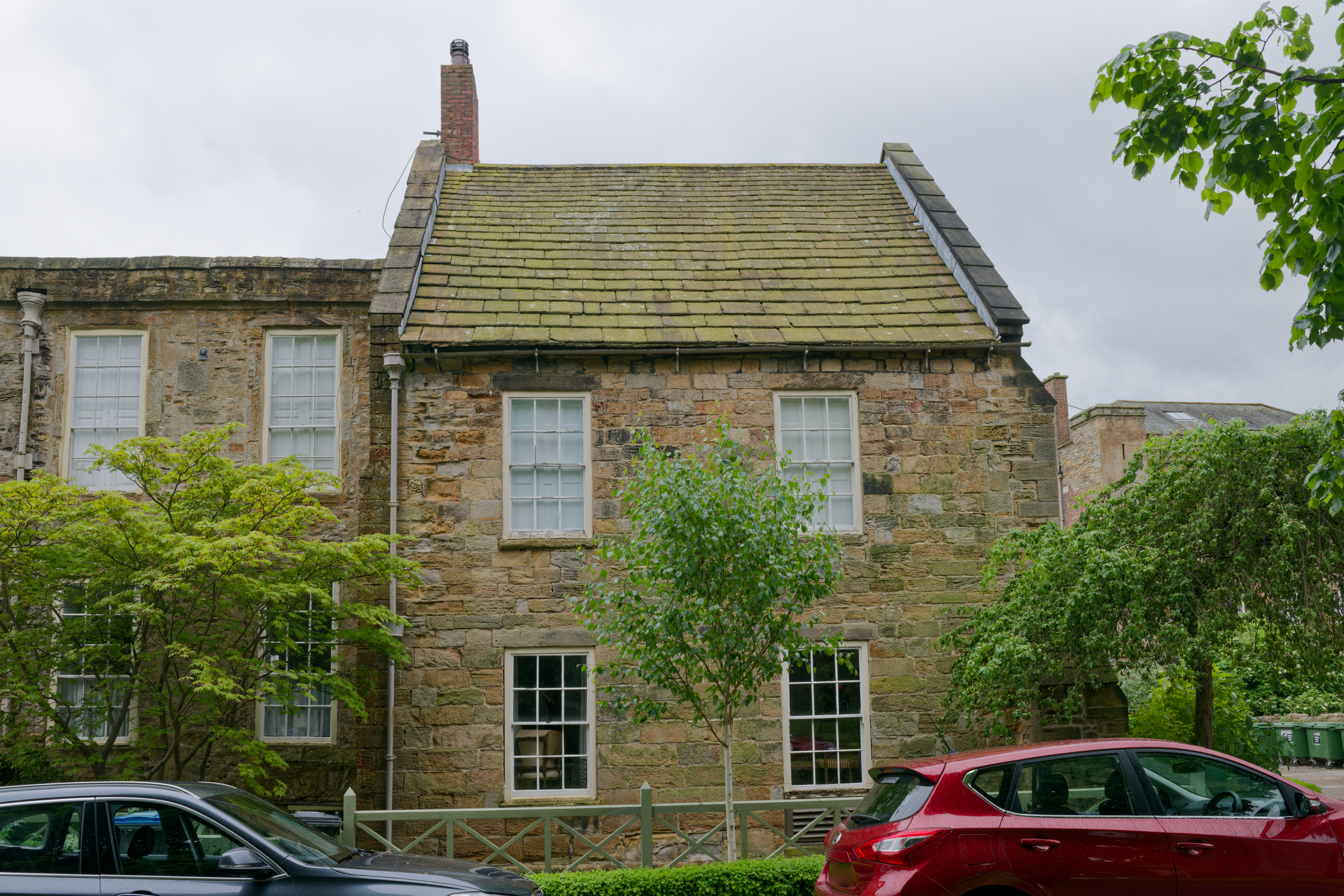
No. 8

== See also ==
- Durham Cathedral
- Durham Castle and Cathedral
- Palace Green
- The Bailey

== Sources ==
- Colvin, Howard (1978). A Biographical Dictionary of British Architects: 1600-1840. London: John Murray. ISBN 978-0-300-07207-5.
- Roberts, Martin; Pevsner, Nikolaus; Williamson, Elizabeth (2021). County Durham. Buildings of England. New Haven, US and London: Yale University Press. ISBN 978-0-300-22504-4. OCLC 1225908677.
