= Richard Hunt (Dean of Durham) =

English clergyman

Richard Hunt (died 2 November 1638) was a 17th-century English clergyman, who served as Dean of Durham.

Hunt was educated at Trinity College, Cambridge, matriculating in 1582, graduating B.A. 1586, M.A. 1589, D.D. 1608.

In the church, he held the following positions:

- Rector of Foulsham, Norfolk, 1594
- Rector of Bintree, Norfolk, 1603
- Rector of Terrington St Clement, Norfolk, 1614
- Prebendary of Canterbury Cathedral, 1614–1631
- Dean of Durham, 1620–1638

(The Richard Hunt who was a prebendary of Lichfield Cathedral from 1636 appears to have been a different individual.)

He was installed as Dean of Durham on 29 May 1620, serving until his death. During his tenure, he had Prior Castell's Clock in Durham Cathedral renovated. He died on 2 November 1638, and was buried in Durham Cathedral.

Church of England titles
Preceded by Adam Newton	Dean of Durham; 1620–1638	Succeeded by Walter Balcanquhall
