= Durham Castle and Cathedral =

World Heritage Site in Durham, England

UNESCO World Heritage Site
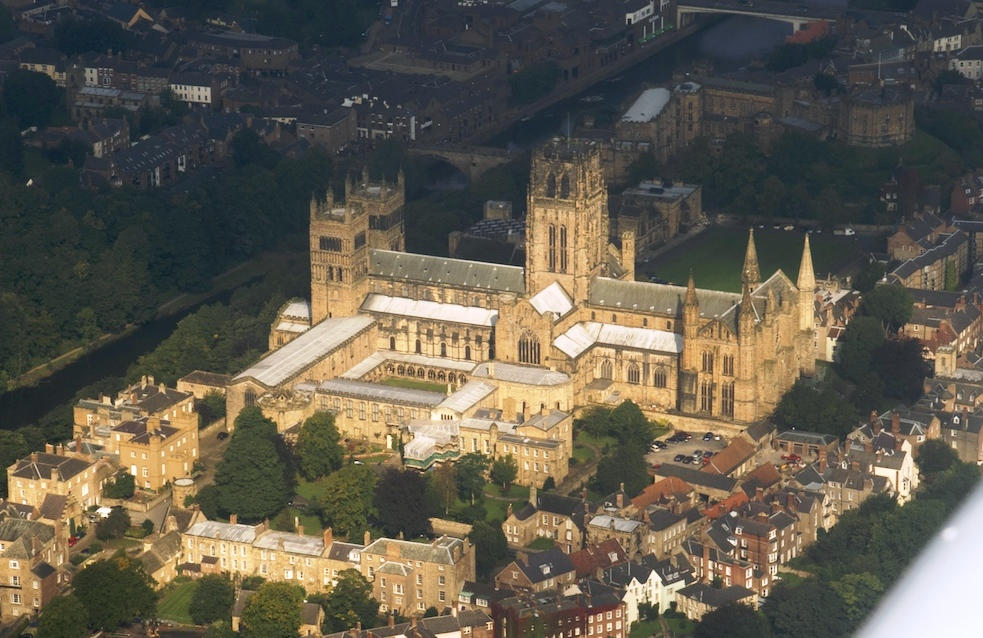
- Aerial photograph of Durham Cathedral with Durham Castle in the background

- Location within County Durham
- Location: Durham, County Durham, England
- Criteria: Cultural: (ii), (iv), (vi)
- Reference: 370
- Inscription: 1986 (10th Session)
- Extensions: 2008
- Coordinates: 54°46′29″N 1°34′34″W

Durham Castle and Cathedral is a World Heritage Site in Durham, England, inscribed in 1986, with a minor boundary modification in 2008. The site pairs the Norman cathedral—begun in the late 11th to early 12th centuries to house the relics of St Cuthbert and the Venerable Bede and noted for vaulting that anticipated the Gothic—with the adjoining Norman castle, seat and stronghold of the prince-bishops. Occupying a defensible peninsula above a bend of the River Wear, the property covers about 8.79 ha.

The inscribed area also includes buildings around Palace Green, among them University College, Durham and Durham Cathedral College.

== See also ==
- List of World Heritage Sites in the United Kingdom
- Durham Cathedral
- Durham Castle
- Durham Cathedral College
- The Bailey
