= Durham Cathedral =

Church in Durham, County Durham, England

Coordinates: 54°46′25″N 1°34′34″W

- Cathedral Church of Christ, Blessed Mary the Virgin and St Cuthbert of Durham
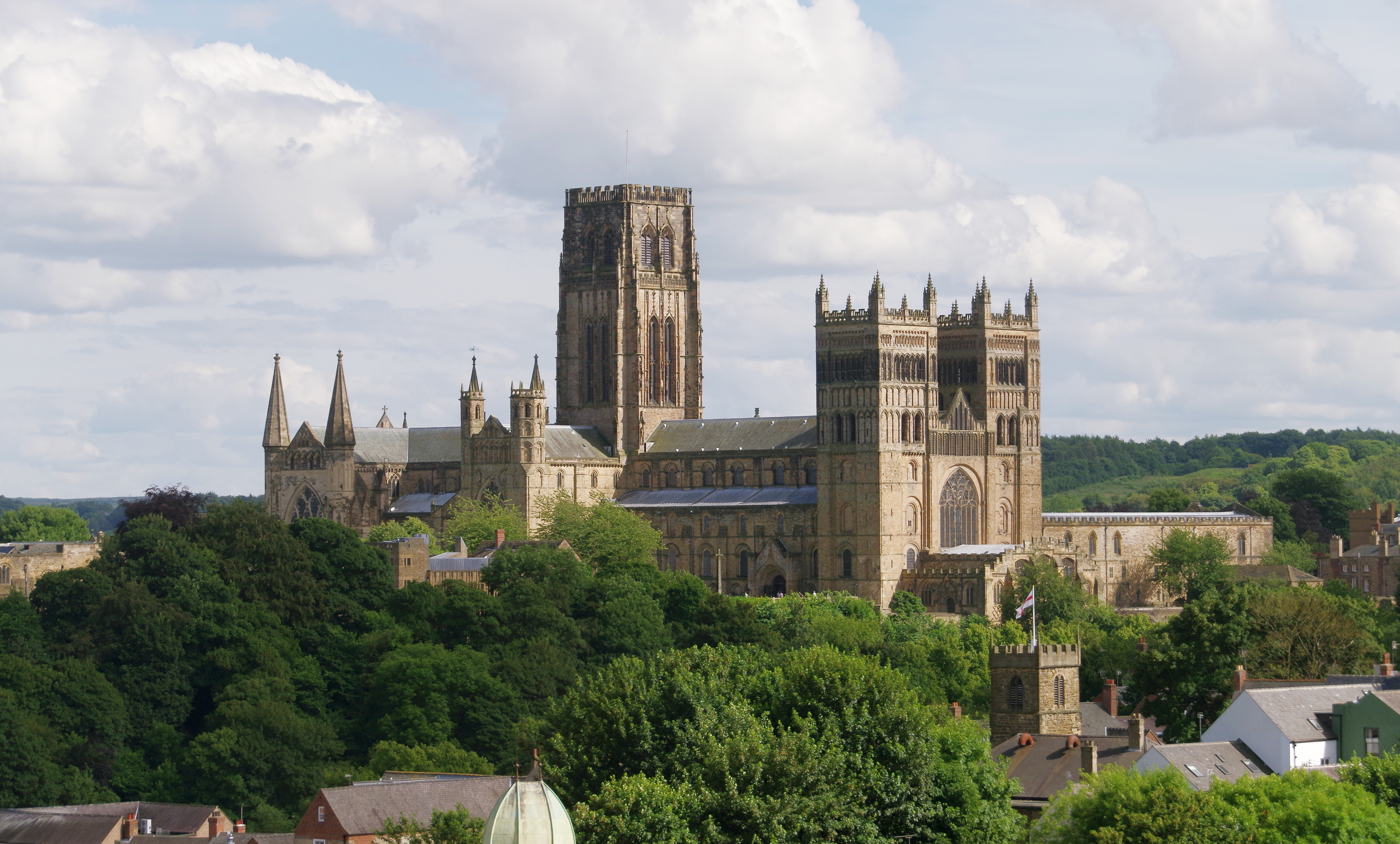
- Durham Cathedral from the north-west

- Location within Durham
- OS grid reference: NZ 27360 42144
- Location: Durham
- Country: England
- Denomination: Church of England
- Previous denomination: Roman Catholic
- Tradition: Broad church
- Website: durhamcathedral.co.uk

History
- Status: Cathedral

Architecture
- Functional status: Active
- Heritage designation: Grade I listed
- Designated: 6 May 1952
- Architectural type: Cathedral
- Style: Norman/Romanesque, Gothic
- Years built: 1093–1133, additions until 1490

Specifications
- Length: 469 feet (143 m) (interior)

Administration
- Province: York
- Diocese: Durham

Clergy
- Bishop: Rick Simpson
- Dean: Philip Plyming
- Pastor: Michael Everitt

UNESCO World Heritage Site
- Part of: Durham Castle and Cathedral
- Criteria: Cultural: ii, iv, vi
- Reference: 370
- Inscription: 1986 (10th Session)

Durham Cathedral, formally the Cathedral Church of Christ, Blessed Mary the Virgin and St Cuthbert of Durham, is a Church of England cathedral in the city of Durham, England. The cathedral is the seat of the Bishop of Durham and is the mother church of the diocese of Durham. It also contains the shrines of the Anglo-Saxon saints Cuthbert and Bede. There are daily Church of England services at the cathedral, and it received 393,090 visitors in 2024. It is a grade I listed building and forms part of the Durham Castle and Cathedral World Heritage Site.

The cathedral is the successor to the Anglo-Saxon Lindisfarne Priory, which was established c. 635 but abandoned in 875 in the face of Viking raids. The monks settled at Chester-le-Street from 882 until 995, when they moved to Durham. The cathedral remained a monastery (Durham Priory) until it was dissolved in 1541, since when it has been governed by a dean and chapter. The cathedral precinct formed part of Durham Castle from the eleventh century. During the Wars of the Three Kingdoms the cathedral housed 3,000 Scottish prisoners of war, 1,700 of whom died in the building.

A substantial part of the present building was completed between 1093 and 1133, replacing the Anglo-Saxon "White Church". It is a significant example of the Romanesque architectural style, and the nave ceiling is the earliest surviving example of a pointed rib vault. The Galilee chapel was added to the west end of the cathedral in the 1170s, and the western towers built in approximately 1200. The east end was expanded in the Early English Gothic style in the 1230s, and the Perpendicular Gothic central tower was built in two stages in the fifteenth century. Important furnishings include the medieval bishop's throne and Neville screen, Prior Castell's Clock, and the seventeenth-century choir stalls and font cover installed by Bishop Cosin. Many of the monastic buildings survive; the monks' refectory now contains part of the cathedral library, which holds significant collections dating back to the sixth century.

== History ==
=== Anglo-Saxon ===
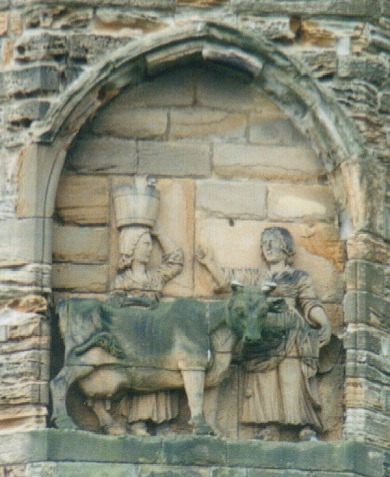
Legend of the founding of Durham depicted on cathedral

The See of Durham takes its origins from the Diocese of Lindisfarne, founded by Saint Aidan at the behest of Oswald of Northumbria in about 635, which was translated to York in 664. The see was reinstated at Lindisfarne in 678 by the Archbishop of Canterbury. Among the many saints who originated at Lindisfarne Priory, the greatest was Saint Cuthbert, Bishop of Lindisfarne from 685 until his death in 687, who is central to the development of Durham Cathedral.

After repeated Viking raids, the monks fled from Lindisfarne in 875, carrying Saint Cuthbert's relics with them. The diocese of Lindisfarne remained itinerant until 882, when the monks resettled at Chester-le-Street, 60 miles south of Lindisfarne and 6 miles north of Durham. The see remained at Chester-le-Street until 995, when further Viking incursions once again caused the monks to move with their relics. According to the local legend of the Dun Cow and the saint's hagiography, the monks followed two milk maids who were searching for a dun-coloured cow and found themselves on a peninsula formed by a loop in the River Wear. Thereupon, Cuthbert's coffin became immovable, which was taken as a sign that the new shrine should be built on that spot, which became the City of Durham. A more prosaic set of reasons for the selection of the peninsula is its highly defensible position, and that a community established there would enjoy the protection of the Earl of Northumbria, with whom the bishop at this time, Aldhun, had strong family connections. Today the street leading from The Bailey past the cathedral's eastern towers up to Palace Green is named Dun Cow Lane due to the miniature dun cows which used to graze in the pastures nearby.

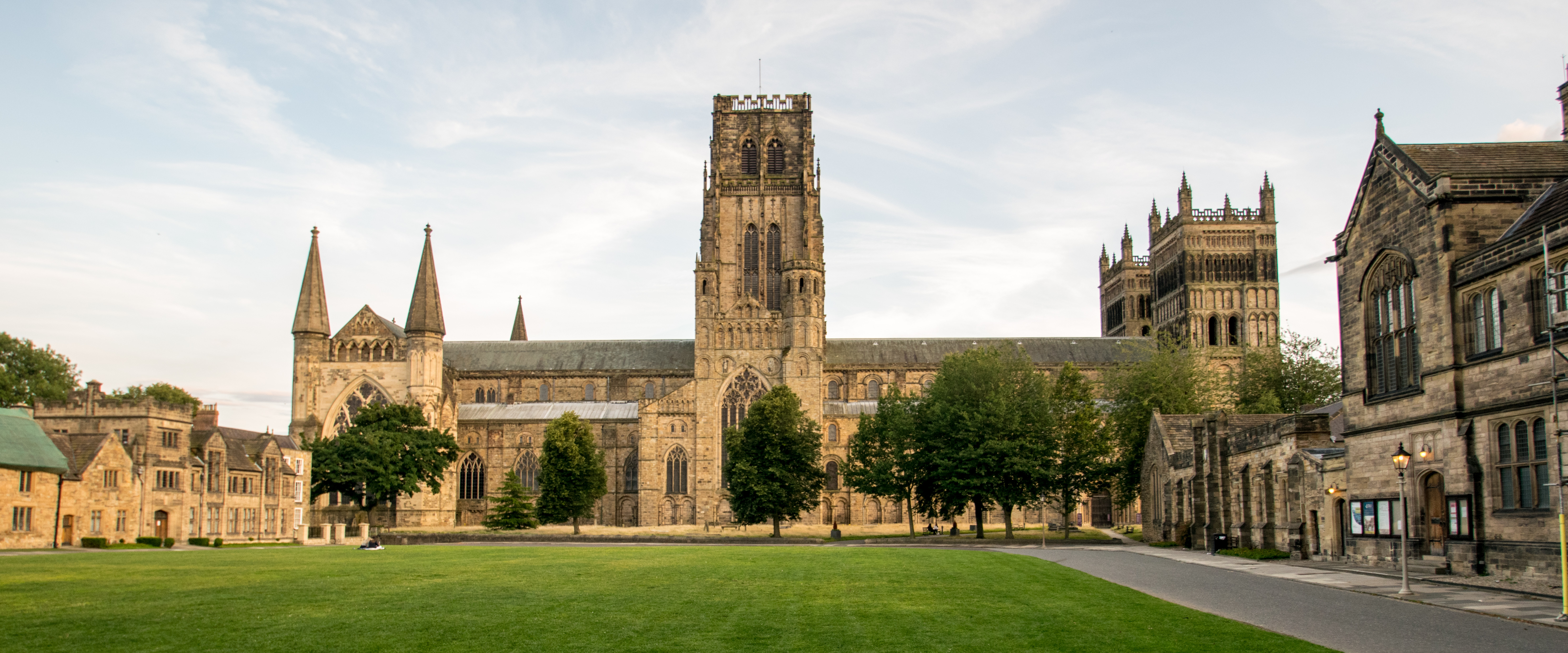
Durham Cathedral seen from the North (Palace Green)

Initially, a very simple temporary structure was built from local timber to house the relics of Saint Cuthbert. The shrine was then transferred to a sturdier, probably still wooden, building known as the White Church. This church was itself replaced three years later in 998 by a stone building also known as the White Church, which in 1018 was complete except for its tower. Durham soon became a site of pilgrimage, encouraged by the growing cult of Saint Cuthbert. King Canute was one of the early pilgrims, and granted many privileges and estates to the Durham monks. The defensible position, flow of money from pilgrims and power embodied in the church at Durham all encouraged the formation of a town around the cathedral, which established the core of the city.

=== Medieval ===
The present cathedral was designed and built under William de St-Calais (also known as William of St. Carilef). In 1083 he founded the Benedictine Priory of St. Cuthbert at Durham and having ejected the secular canons (and their wives and children) who had been in charge of the church and shrine of St Cuthbert there, replaced them with monks from the monasteries of Wearmouth and Jarrow. The extensive lands of the church he divided between his own bishopric and the new Priory. He appointed Aldwin as the first prior.

Bishop William of St. Calais demolished the old Saxon church, and on 11 August 1093, together with Prior Turgot of Durham (Aldwin's successor), he laid the foundation stone of the great new cathedral. The monks continued at their own expense to build the monastic buildings while the bishop took the responsibility for completing the building of the cathedral. Stone for the new buildings was cut from the cliffs below the walls and moved up using winches. The primary reason for the cathedral was to house the bodies of St. Cuthbert and the Venerable Bede.

Since that time many major additions and reconstructions of parts of the building have been made, but the greater part of the structure remains the original Norman structure. Construction of the cathedral began in 1093, at the eastern end. The choir was completed by 1096. At the death of Bishop William of St. Calais on 2 January 1096, the Chapter House was ready enough to be used as his burial place. In 1104 the remains of St. Cuthbert were transferred with great ceremony to the new shrine in the new cathedral. The monks continued to look after the Shrine of St Cuthbert until the dissolution of the monasteries.

The nave looking east

Work proceeded on the nave, the walls of which were finished by 1128, and the high vault by 1135. The chapter house was built between 1133 and 1140 (partially demolished in the 18th century). William of St. Carilef died in 1096 before the building was complete and passed responsibility to his successor, Ranulf Flambard, who also built Framwellgate Bridge, the earliest crossing of the River Wear from the town. Three bishops, William of St. Carilef, Ranulf Flambard and Hugh de Puiset, are all buried in the now rebuilt chapter house.

In the 1170s Hugh de Puiset, after a false start at the eastern end where subsidence and cracking prevented work from continuing, added the Galilee Chapel at the west end of the cathedral in 1175. The five-aisled building occupies the position of a porch and functioned as a Lady chapel with the great west door being blocked during the Medieval period by an altar to the Virgin Mary. The door is now blocked by the tomb of Bishop Thomas Langley. The Galilee Chapel also holds the remains of the Venerable Bede.

In 1228 Richard le Poore, Bishop of Salisbury, was translated to Durham, having just rebuilt Salisbury Cathedral in the Gothic style. At that moment the eastern end of Durham Cathedral was in urgent need of repair and the proposed eastern extension had failed. Le Poore employed the architect Richard Farnham to design an eastern terminal for the building in which many monks could say the Daily Office simultaneously. The resulting building was the Chapel of the Nine Altars. In 1250, the original choir vault had badly cracked and was replaced by the present Gothic version. The west towers also date from the early 13th century, but the central tower was damaged by lightning and replaced in two stages in the 15th century, the master masons being Thomas Barton and John Bell.

The bishop of Durham was the temporal lord of the County Palatine of Durham. The bishop competed for power with the prior of Durham, a great landowner who held his own courts for his free tenants. An agreement dated about 1229, known as Le Convenit was entered into to regulate the relationship between the two magnates.

The Shrine of Saint Cuthbert was located in the eastern apsidal end of the cathedral, and remained in the same position even when the apse was replaced with the Chapel of the Nine Altars. The location of the inner wall of the apse is marked on the pavement and Saint Cuthbert's tomb is covered by a simple slab. However, a former monk wrote in 1593:

[The shrine] was estimated to be one of the most sumptuous in all England, so great were the offerings and jewells bestowed upon it, and endless the miracles that were wrought at it, even in these last days.

— Rites of Durham,

=== Dissolution ===
During the English Reformation King Henry VIII seized all churches, monasteries, priories and convents owned by the Roman Catholic Church. Durham Cathedral became an Anglican house of worship. Saint Cuthbert's tomb was destroyed in 1538 by order of King Henry VIII, and the monastery's wealth was handed over to the king. The body of the saint was exhumed, and, according to the Rites of Durham, was discovered to be uncorrupted. It was reburied under a plain stone slab now worn smooth by the knees of pilgrims, but the Norman paving around it remains intact. Two years later, on 31 December 1540, the Benedictine monastery at Durham was dissolved, and the last Prior of Durham, Hugh Whitehead, became the first dean of the cathedral's secular chapter.

=== 17th century ===
After the Battle of Dunbar in September 1650, Durham Cathedral was used by Parliamentarian forces as a makeshift prison to hold up to 3,000 Scottish prisoners of war. An estimated 1,700 prisoners died while imprisoned in the cathedral, as they were kept in poor conditions and were lacking in food, water or heat. The prisoners destroyed much of the cathedral woodwork for firewood, but Prior Castell's Clock, which featured the Scottish thistle, was spared. Dead prisoners were buried in unmarked graves, and the survivors were transported as indentured servants to the American colonies.

Bishop John Cosin (in office 1660–1672), previously a canon of the cathedral, set about restoring the damage and refurnishing the building with new stalls, the litany desk, and the towering canopy over the font. An oak screen to carry the organ was added at this time to replace a stone screen pulled down in the 16th century. On the remains of the old refectory, Dean John Sudbury founded a library of early printed books.

=== 18th and 19th centuries ===
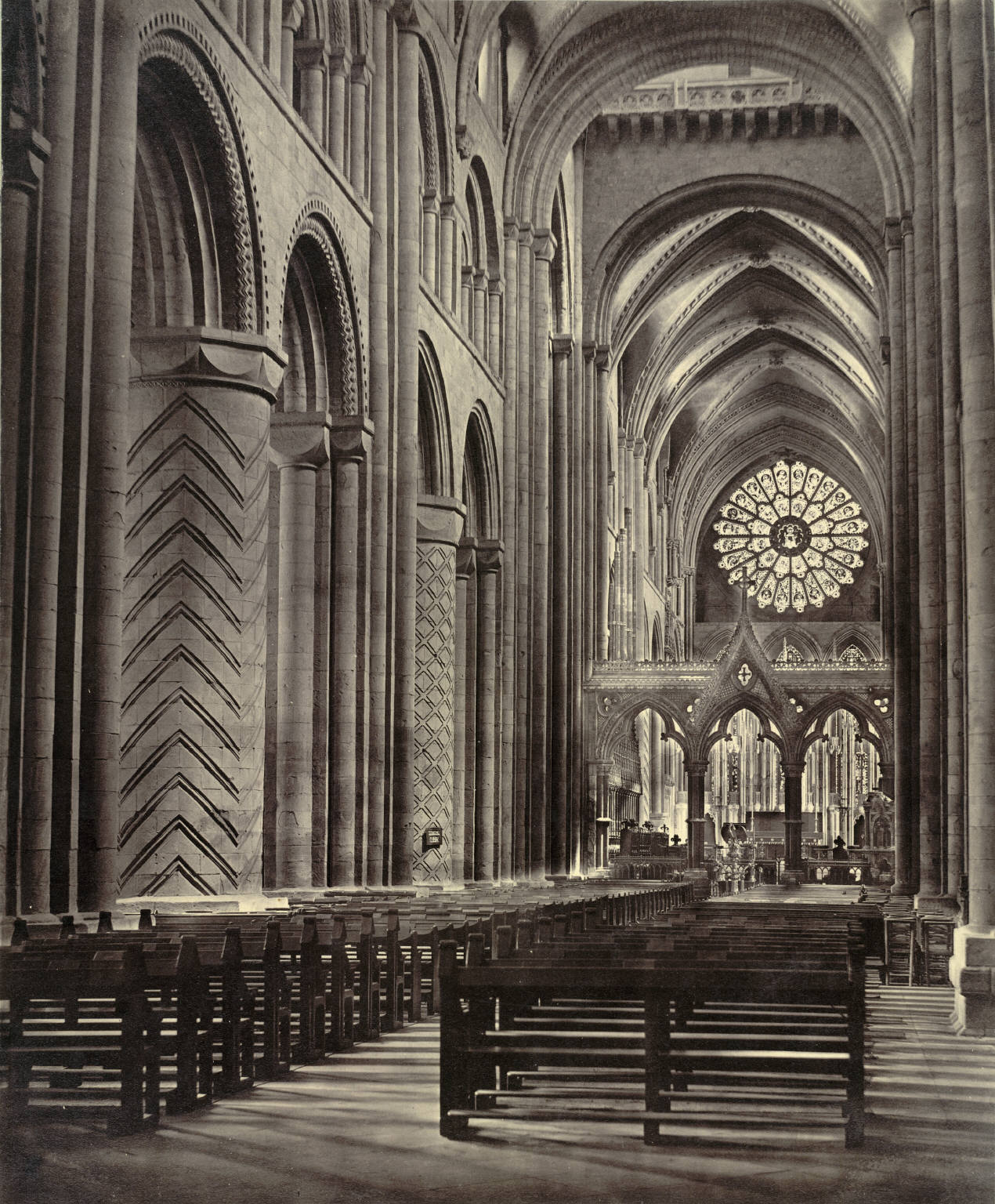
Photo from the late 19th century

During the 18th century the Deans of Durham often held another position in the south of England and after spending the statutory time in residence, would depart southward to manage their affairs. Consequently, after Cosin's refurbishment, there was little by way of restoration or rebuilding. When work commenced again on the building, it was not always of a sympathetic nature. In 1777 the architect George Nicholson, having completed Prebends' Bridge across the Wear, persuaded the dean and chapter to let him smooth off much of the outer stonework of the cathedral, thereby considerably altering its character. His successor William Morpeth demolished most of the Chapter House. In 1794 James Wyatt drew up plans to transform the building, including the demolition of the Galilee Chapel, but the chapter later decided against many of the intended changes. Wyatt renewed the 15th-century tracery of the Rose Window, inserting plain glass to replace what had been blown out in a storm.

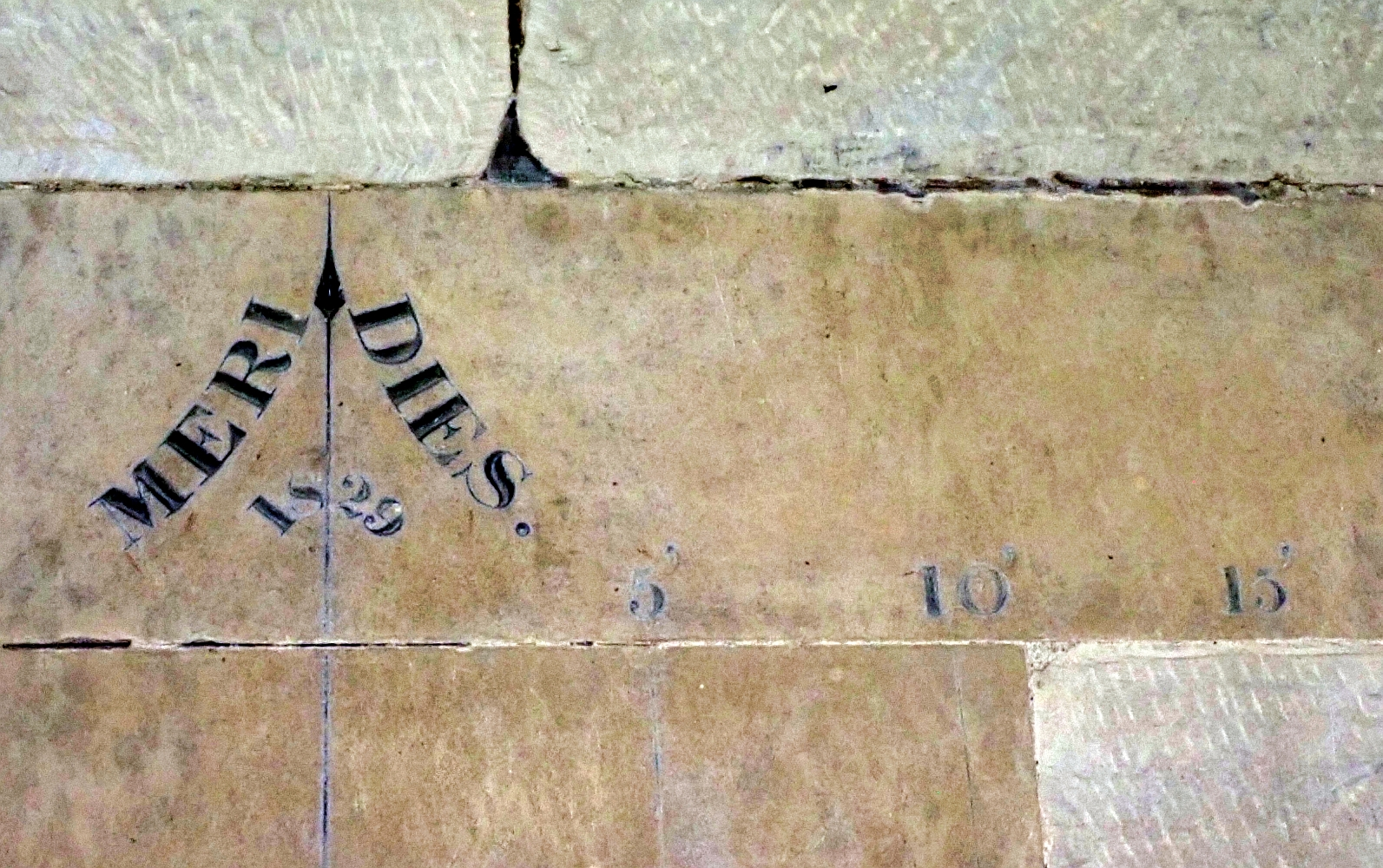
Durham Cathedral meridian mark (1829)

In 1829 the Dean and Chapter authorised the engraving of a meridian line upon the floor and wall of the north cloister. A circular aperture about 1 inch (2.5 cm) in the tracery of the adjoining window about 10 feet (3 m) above the level of the floor directs a beam of sunlight to fall upon the line at the precise time when the sun passes the meridian. It was constructed by William Lloyd Wharton, of Dryburn in the city, and Mr Carr, then Head Master of Durham School. In 1847 the architect Anthony Salvin removed Cosin's wooden organ screen, opening up the view of the east end from the nave, and in 1858 he restored the cloisters.

The Victorian restoration of the cathedral's tower in 1859–60 was by the architect George Gilbert Scott, working with Edward Robert Robson (who went on to serve as Clerk of Works at the cathedral for six years). In 1874 Scott was responsible for the marble choir screen and pulpit in the Crossing. In 1892 Scott's pupil Charles Hodgson Fowler rebuilt the Chapter House as a memorial to Bishop Joseph Barber Lightfoot. The great west window, depicting the Tree of Jesse, was the gift of Dean George Waddington in 1867. It is the work of Clayton and Bell, who were also responsible for the Te Deum window in the south transept (1869), the Four Doctors window in the north transept (1875), and the Rose Window of Christ in Majesty (c. 1876). There is also a statue of William Van Mildert (1826–1836), the last bishop with palatine powers, and driving force behind the foundation of Durham University.

The towers at the West end of the nave

=== 20th century ===
In the 1930s, under the inspiration of Dean Cyril Alington, work began on restoring the Shrine of Saint Cuthbert behind the high altar as an appropriate focus of worship and pilgrimage, and was resumed after World War II. The four candlesticks and overhanging tester (c. 1950) were designed by Ninian Comper. Two large batik banners representing Saints Cuthbert and Oswald, added in 2001, are the work of Thetis Blacker. Elsewhere in the building the 1930s and 1940s saw the addition of several new stained glass windows by Hugh Ray Easton. Mark Angus's Daily Bread window in the north side of the nave, dates from 1984. In the Galilee Chapel a wooden statue of the Annunciation by the Polish artist Josef Pyrz was added in 1992, the same year as Leonard Evetts' Stella Maris window.

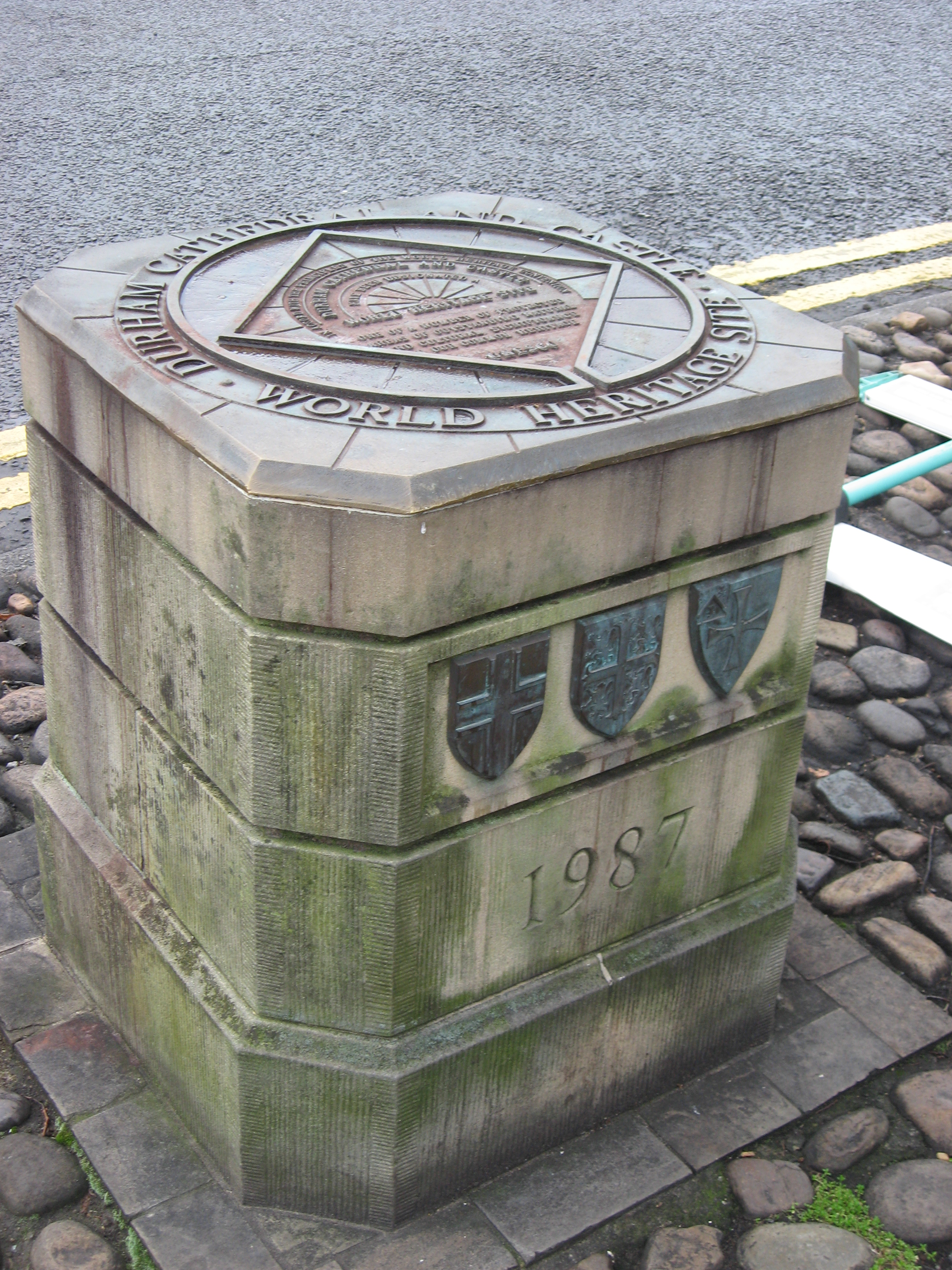
Durham World Heritage marker

In 1986, the cathedral, together with the nearby Castle, became a World Heritage Site. The UNESCO committee classified the cathedral under criteria C (ii) (iv) (vi), reporting, "Durham Cathedral is the largest and most perfect monument of 'Norman' style architecture in England".

In its discussion of the significance of the cathedral, Historic England provided this summary in their 1986 report:

The relics and material culture of the three saints buried at the site. The continuity of use and ownership of the site over the past 1000 years as a place of religious worship, learning and residence; The site's role as a political statement of Norman power imposed upon a subjugate nation, as one of the country's most powerful symbols of the Norman Conquest of Britain; The importance of the site's archaeological remains, which are directly related to the site's history and continuity of use over the past 1000 years; The cultural and religious traditions and historical memories associated with the relics of St Cuthbert and the Venerable Bede, and with the continuity of use and ownership of the site over the past millennium.

=== 21st century ===
Towers and main entrance of Durham Cathedral in 2026

At the beginning of this century two of the altars in the Nine Altars Chapel at the east end of the cathedral were re-dedicated to Saint Hild of Whitby and Saint Margaret of Scotland: a striking painting of Margaret (with her son, the future king David) by Paula Rego was dedicated in 2004. Nearby a plaque, first installed in 2011 and rededicated in 2017, commemorates the Scottish soldiers who died as prisoners in the cathedral after the Battle of Dunbar in 1650. The remains of some of these prisoners have now been identified in a mass grave uncovered during building works in 2013 just outside the cathedral precinct near Palace Green. In 2004 two wooden sculptures by Fenwick Lawson, Pietà and Tomb of Christ, were placed in the Nine Altars Chapel, and in 2010 a new stained glass window of the Transfiguration by the artist Thomas Denny was dedicated in memory of Michael Ramsey, former Bishop of Durham and Archbishop of Canterbury.

In 2016 former monastic buildings around the cloister, including the Monks' Dormitory and Prior's Kitchen, were re-opened to the public as Open Treasure, an extensive exhibition displaying the cathedral's history and possessions. In the same year, a scale model of the cathedral, made up of 300,000 Lego bricks and standing 5 ft 6 in (1.7 m) tall and 12 ft 6 in (3.8 m) long, was completed. The model is no longer displayed. In November 2009 the cathedral featured in the light festival Lumiere whose highlight was the "Crown of Light" illumination of the North Front of the cathedral with a 15-minute presentation that told the story of Lindisfarne and the foundation of cathedral, using illustrations and text from the Lindisfarne Gospels. Lumiere has been repeated biennially since–most recently in 2023. Durham Priory held many manuscripts; in the 21st century, steps were under way to digitise the books, originating from the 6th to the 16th century. The project was being undertaken in a partnership by Durham University and Durham Cathedral. The cathedral church and the cloister is open to visitors during certain hours each day, unless it is closed for a special event. In 2017 a new "Open Treasure" exhibition area was opened which included a display of Saint Cuthbert's coffin and various relics; in 2019 a new exhibit was added, Mapping the World, featuring geographical items from the cathedral's archive.

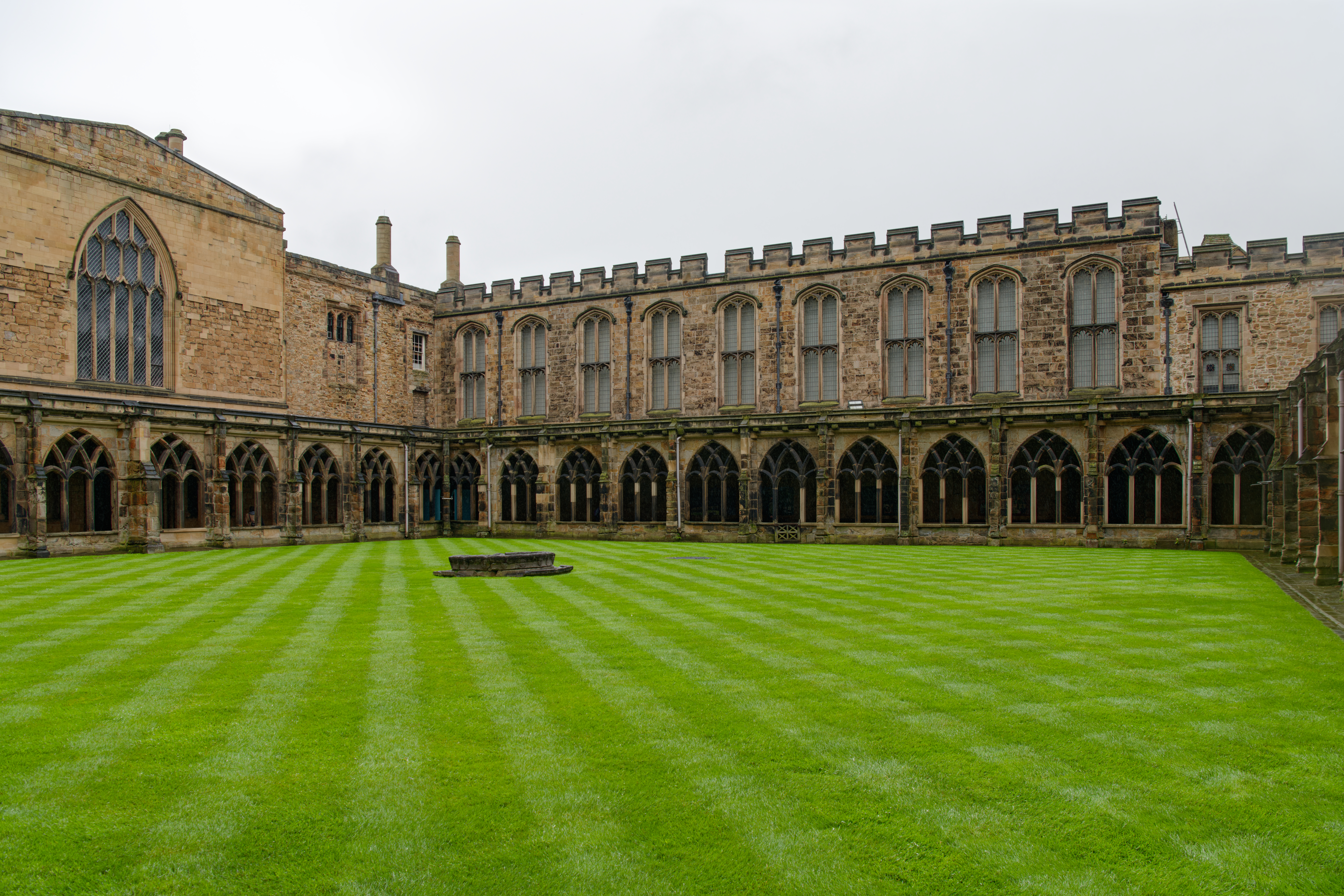
The cloisters of Durham Cathedral, seen from above and within

== Architecture ==
Durham Cathedral viewed from Palace Green

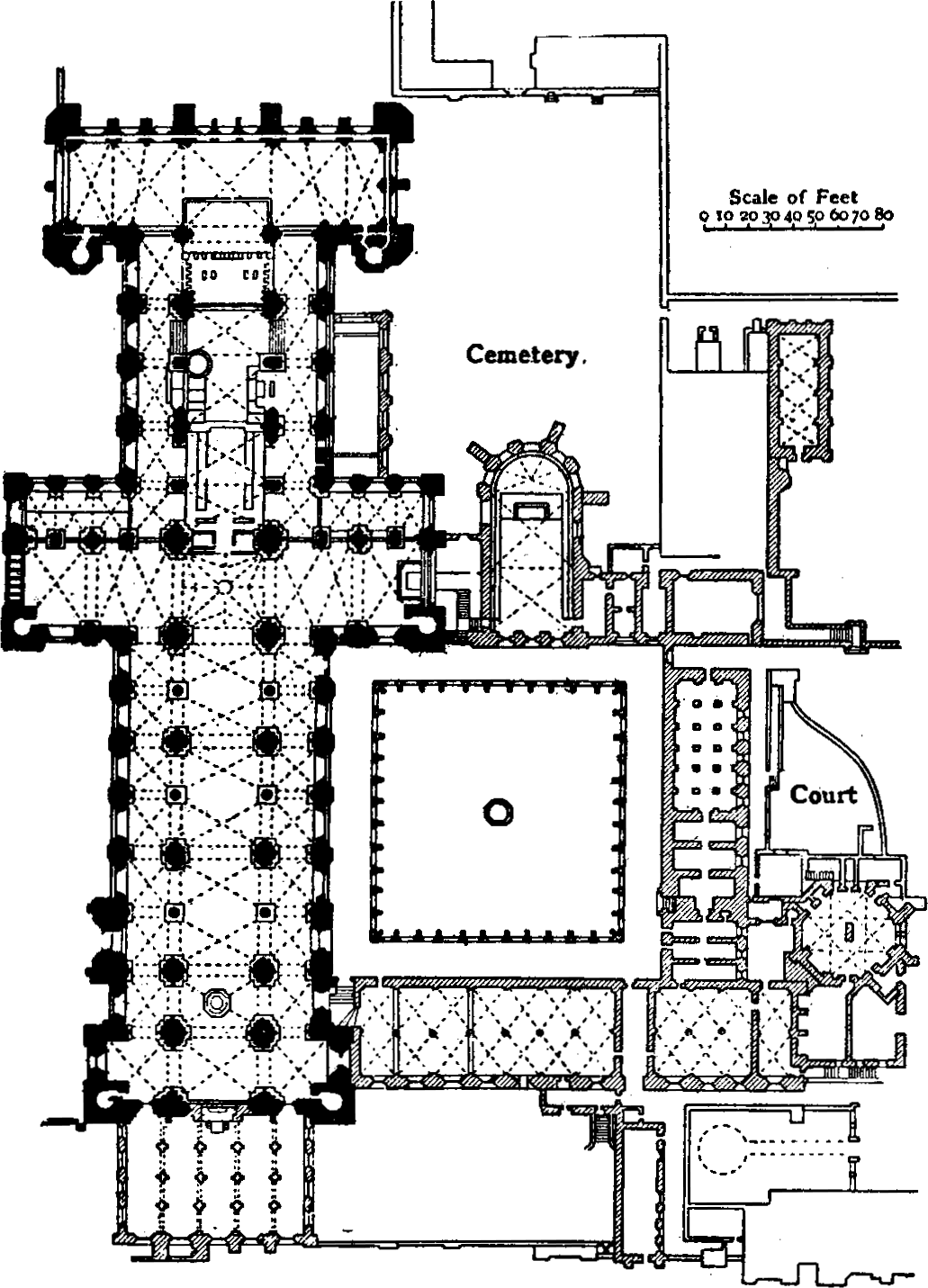
Floor plan

There is some evidence that the aisle of the choir had the earliest rib vaults in England, as was argued by John Bilson, English architect, at the end of the nineteenth century. Since then it has been argued that other buildings like Lessay Abbey in north-west France provided the early experimental ribs that created the high technical level shown in Durham. There is evidence in the clerestory walls of the choir that the high vault had ribs. There is controversy between John James and Malcolm Thurlby on whether these rib vaults were four-part or six-part, which remains unresolved.

Ribbed vault of the nave

The building is notable for the ribbed vault of the nave, with some of the earliest transverse pointed arches supported on relatively slender composite piers alternated with massive drum columns, and lateral abutments concealed within the triforium over the aisles. These features appear to be precursors of the Gothic architecture of Northern France, possibly due to the Norman stonemasons responsible, although the building is considered Romanesque overall. The skilled use of the pointed arch and ribbed vault made it possible to cover far more elaborate and complicated ground plans than before. Buttressing made it possible to build taller buildings and open up the intervening wall spaces to create larger windows.

The UNESCO World Heritage Site description makes this comment about the architectural style:

Though some wrongly considered Durham Cathedral to be the first 'Gothic' monument (the relationship between it and the churches built in the Île-de-France region in the 12th century is not obvious), this building, owing to the innovative audacity of its vaulting, constitutes, as do Spire [Speyer] and Cluny, a type of experimental model which was far ahead of its time.

Another United Nations web site states that

"the use of stone 'ribs' forming pointed arches to support the ceiling of the nave was an important achievement, and Durham Cathedral is the earliest known example" [and] The nave vault of Durham Cathedral is the most significant architectural element ... because it marks a turning point in the history of architecture. The pointed arch was successfully used as a structural element for the first time here in this building. Semi-circular arches were the type used prior to the adoption of the structural pointed arch—the limitations of which is that their height must be proportionate to their width".

Saint Cuthbert's tomb lies at the east in the Feretory and was once an elaborate monument of cream marble and gold. It remains a place of pilgrimage. The fragments of St Cuthbert's coffin are exhibited at the cathedral.

Frosterley marble, not actually a marble but a locally quarried black limestone shot through with fossilized sea creatures including coral, is used for the ribs of several pillars and struts in Durham Cathedral.

== Burials and memorials ==
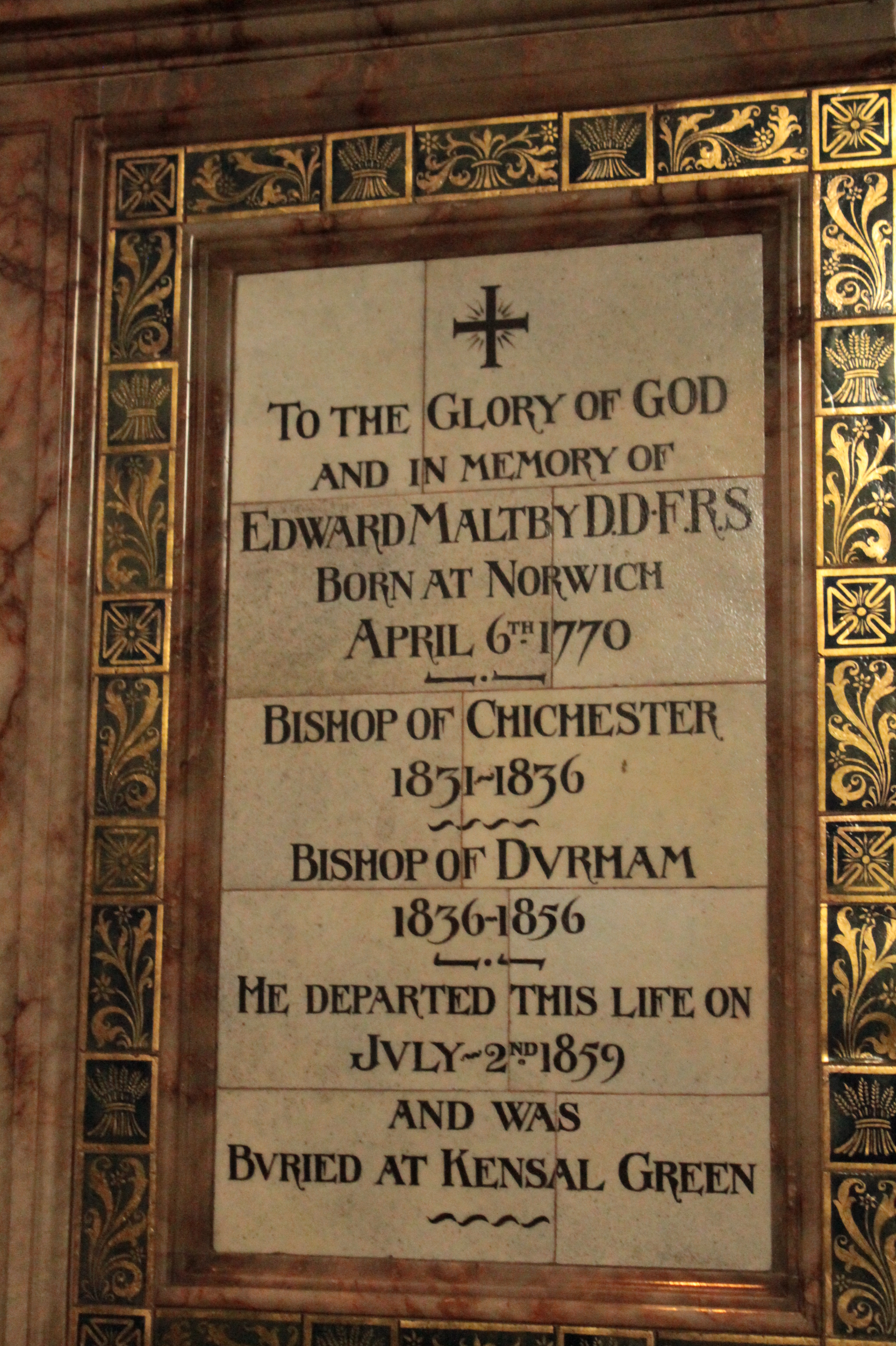
Memorial to Edward Maltby, Durham Cathedral

The cathedral has been the site of the burials of a number of notable individuals in addition to the major saints, including a large number of churchman. Burials include: William de St-Calais, Ranulf Flambard, Geoffrey Rufus, William of St. Barbara, Walter of Kirkham, Robert of Holy Island and Richard Kellaw, all in the chapter house; Nicholas Farnham; John Neville, 3rd Baron Neville, in the south transept; Robert Neville, Bishop of Durham, in the south aisle; the heart of Robert Stitchill; Bishop Anthony Bek; Thomas Sharp, in the Galilee chapel; Thomas Mangey, in the east transept; Thomas Langley, whose tomb blocked the Great West Door necessitating the construction of the two later doors to north and south; James Pilkington, at the head of Beaumont's tomb in front of the high altar; Alfred Robert Tucker, outside the cathedral; Cyril Alington, Dean of Durham and author; John Robson, canon of Durham; Bishop J. B. Lightfoot; and Stephen Kemble, actor of the Kemble family.

Memorials include those to Bishop Joseph Butler, Bishop Edward Maltby, John Wessington (Washington), John Robert Davison QC MP and Brigadier General Herbert Conyers Surtees.

== Dean and chapter ==
The cathedral is governed by the chapter which is chaired by the dean. Durham is a "New Foundation" cathedral in which there are not specific roles to which members of the chapter are appointed, with the exception of the Dean and the Van Mildert Professor of Divinity. The other roles, sub-dean, precentor, sacrist, librarian and treasurer, are elected by the members of the chapter annually. Office holders as at September 2022 were: the Dean – Dean-Designate is Philip Plyming, who will be installed as Dean on 16 September 2023; the Vice-Dean & Canon Precentor – Michael Hampel (since 17 November 2018 installation; acting dean since 25 September 2022); Canon Chancellor – Charlie Allen (since 22 September 2018 installation); Canon Pastor – Michael Everitt (since 22 September 2019 installation); Van Mildert Professor of Divinity (Durham University) and Residentiary Canon – Simon Oliver (since 20 September 2015 installation).

== Music ==
=== Organ ===
In the 17th century Durham had an organ by Smith that was replaced in 1876 by 'Father' Willis (Henry Willis & Sons), with some pipes being reused in Durham Castle chapel. Harrison & Harrison worked on the organ from 1880, restored between 1905 and 1935, rebuilt again in 1970 with a new console, and adding a Classically voiced Positive division, and further refurbishments and minor changes in 1981 and 1996. The cases, designed by C. Hodgson Fowler and decorated by Clayton and Bell date from 1876 and are in the galleries of the choir.

=== Organists ===
The first organist recorded at Durham was John Brimley in 1557. Notable organists have included the composers Thomas Ebdon and Richard Hey Lloyd, editor of the Ancient and Modern Revised hymnbook John Dykes Bower, and (as sub-organist) choral conductor David Hill.

The current Master of the Choristers and Organist is Daniel Cook, having succeeded James Lancelot in 2017. The Sub-Organist is Joseph Beech.

=== Choir ===
There is a regular choir of adult lay clerks, choral scholars and child choristers. The latter are educated at the Chorister School. Traditionally child choristers were all boys, but in November 2009 the cathedral admitted female choristers for the first time. The girls and the boys serve alternately, not as a mixed choir, except at major festivals such as Easter, Advent and Christmas when the two "top lines" come together.

=== Bells ===
There are ten bells in the central tower hung for change ringing in the English style. The tenor weighs 28 long cwt 0 qr 6 lb (3,142 lb or 1,425 kg), diameter 54.63 inches (1,388 mm) tuned to D. Five of the bells (4, 7, 8, 9 and 10) are recognised as historically significant by Church Buildings Council (formerly the Council for the Care of Churches); they were cast in 1693. The remaining bells were cast in 1780 (3), 1781 (5), 1896 (6), 1980 (1 and 2).

== Film and television ==
Durham Cathedral has been used as a filming location in a number of cinema and television productions. Because of its distinct Romanesque architecture, the cathedral has doubled as a number of fantasy locations in larger budget film productions, but it has also been seen as itself in a number of television programmes. Movies filmed at the cathedral include: Jude (1996); Elizabeth; the first two Harry Potter films, Philosopher's Stone and Chamber of Secrets; Snow White and the Huntsman; Avengers: Endgame (2019) and The Old Oak.

Television programmes shot at the cathedral include: Treasurehunt (1988); Songs of Praise; The Antiques Roadshow Britain's Best Buildings (2002) Climbing Great Buildings (2010); Great British Railway Journeys (2011); Richard Wilson: On the Road; All Man; Britain's Great Cathedrals; and two Catherine Cookson adaptations, The Tide of Life and The Wingless Bird.

== Art, literature and quotations ==
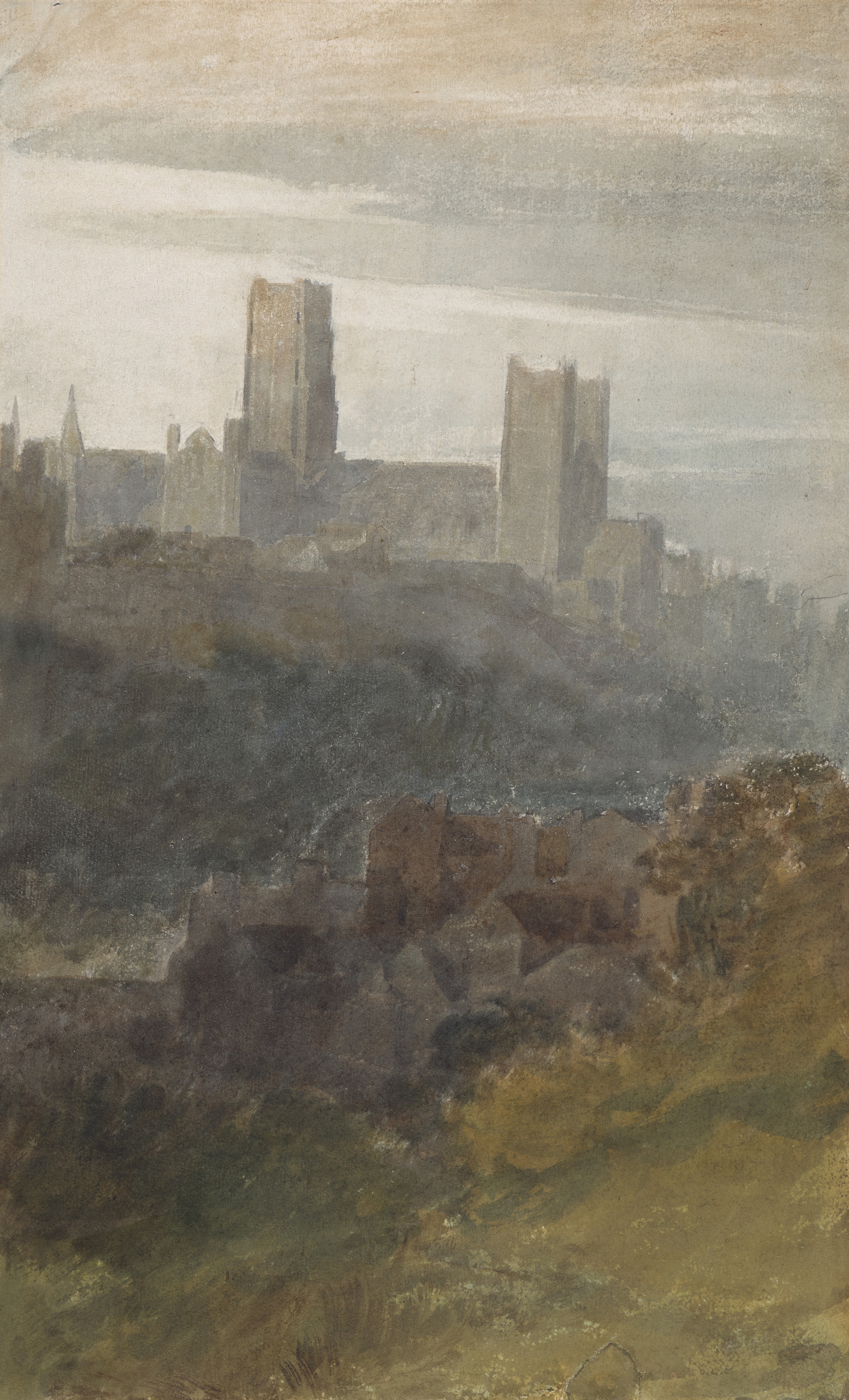
Durham Cathedral by Turner, 1801

Durham Cathedral, a poem by Letitia Landon, appeared in Fisher's Drawing Room Scrap Book of 1835, with an engraving of a painting of the interior by Thomas Allom.

"Half church of God, half castle 'gainst the Scot", according to Sir Walter Scott. Inscription on Prebends Bridge, Durham.

"Durham is one of the great experiences of Europe to the eyes of those who appreciate architecture, and to the minds of those who understand architecture. The group of Cathedral, Castle, and Monastery on the rock can only be compared to Avignon and Prague." – Nikolaus Pevsner, The Buildings of England

"A dream, I'm bowled over...Imagine a river valley cut into the landscape with wooded sides. The river bends, and in the bend, on the hillside, lies the old town—first the residential town, then separate from it, and higher up, the castle—and then, out on its own, in the midst of tall trees, the enormous cathedral with its twin end towers. From the bridge it is a Romantic dream, a fantasy by Schinkel. This morning in the mist it was wonderful...the first thing that has made my heart pound...the cathedral in itself, just like the Matterhorn in itself—gigantic, grey, on its own." – Pevsner in a letter to his wife, Lola, on his first English tour in 1930.

"I paused upon the bridge, and admired and wondered at the beauty and glory of this scene...it was grand, venerable, and sweet, all at once; I never saw so lovely and magnificent a scene, nor, being content with this, do I care to see a better." – Nathaniel Hawthorne on Durham Cathedral, The English Notebooks

'With the cathedral at Durham we reach the incomparable masterpiece of Romanesque architecture not only in England but anywhere. The moment of entering provides for an architectural experience never to be forgotten, one of the greatest England has to offer.' – Alec Clifton-Taylor, 'English Towns' series on BBC television.

"I unhesitatingly gave Durham my vote for best cathedral on planet Earth." – Bill Bryson, Notes from a Small Island.

"Grey towers of Durham
Yet well I love thy mixed and massive piles
Half church of God, half castle 'gainst the Scot
And long to roam those venerable aisles
With records stored of deeds long since forgot."

— Walter Scott, Harold the Dauntless, a poem of Saxons and Vikings set in County Durham.

== Gallery ==
Exterior

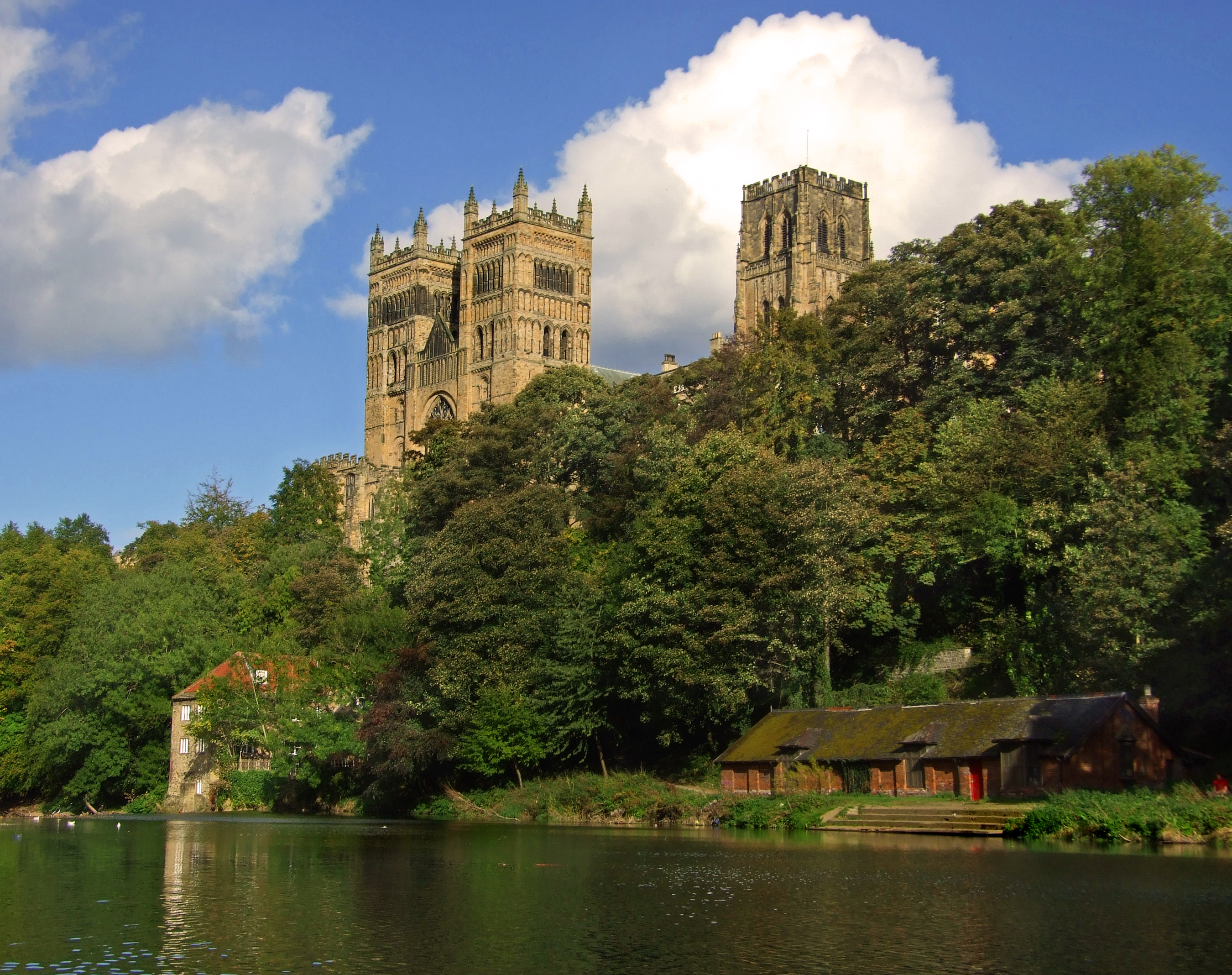
View from the River Wear

The North portal, main entrance to the cathedral

The 12th-century Sanctuary Knocker, on the North portal door
Interior

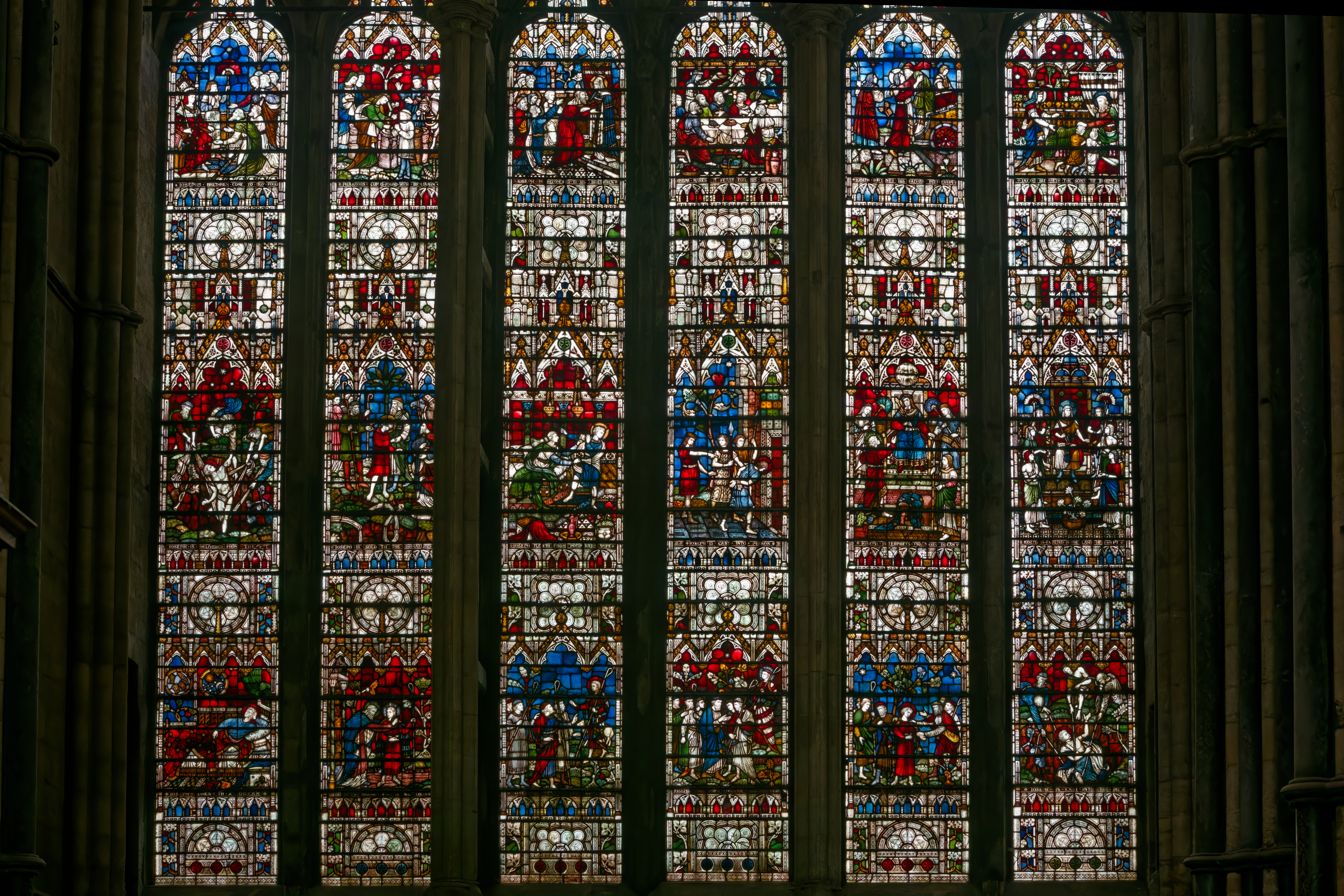
East Window

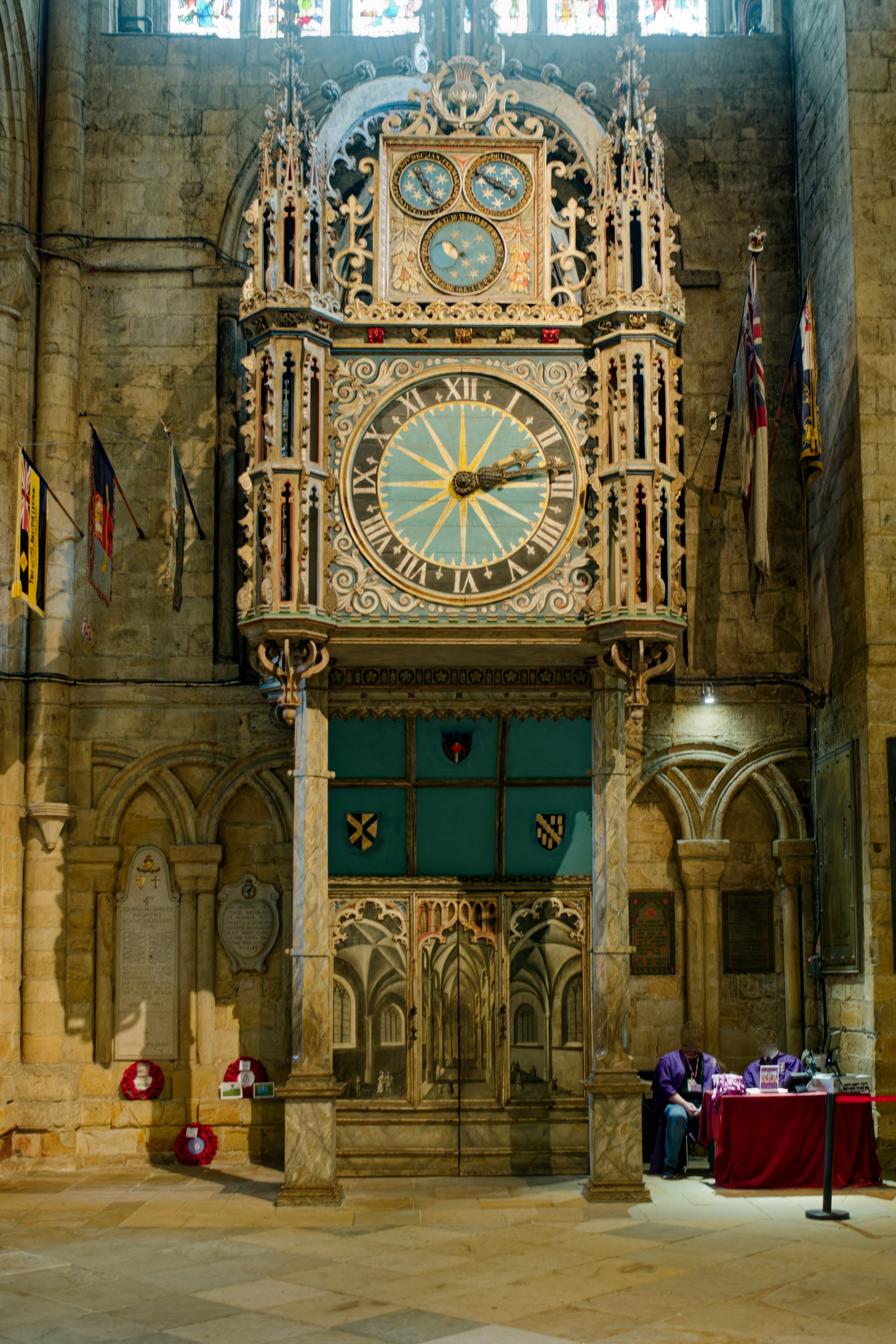
Prior Castell's Clock

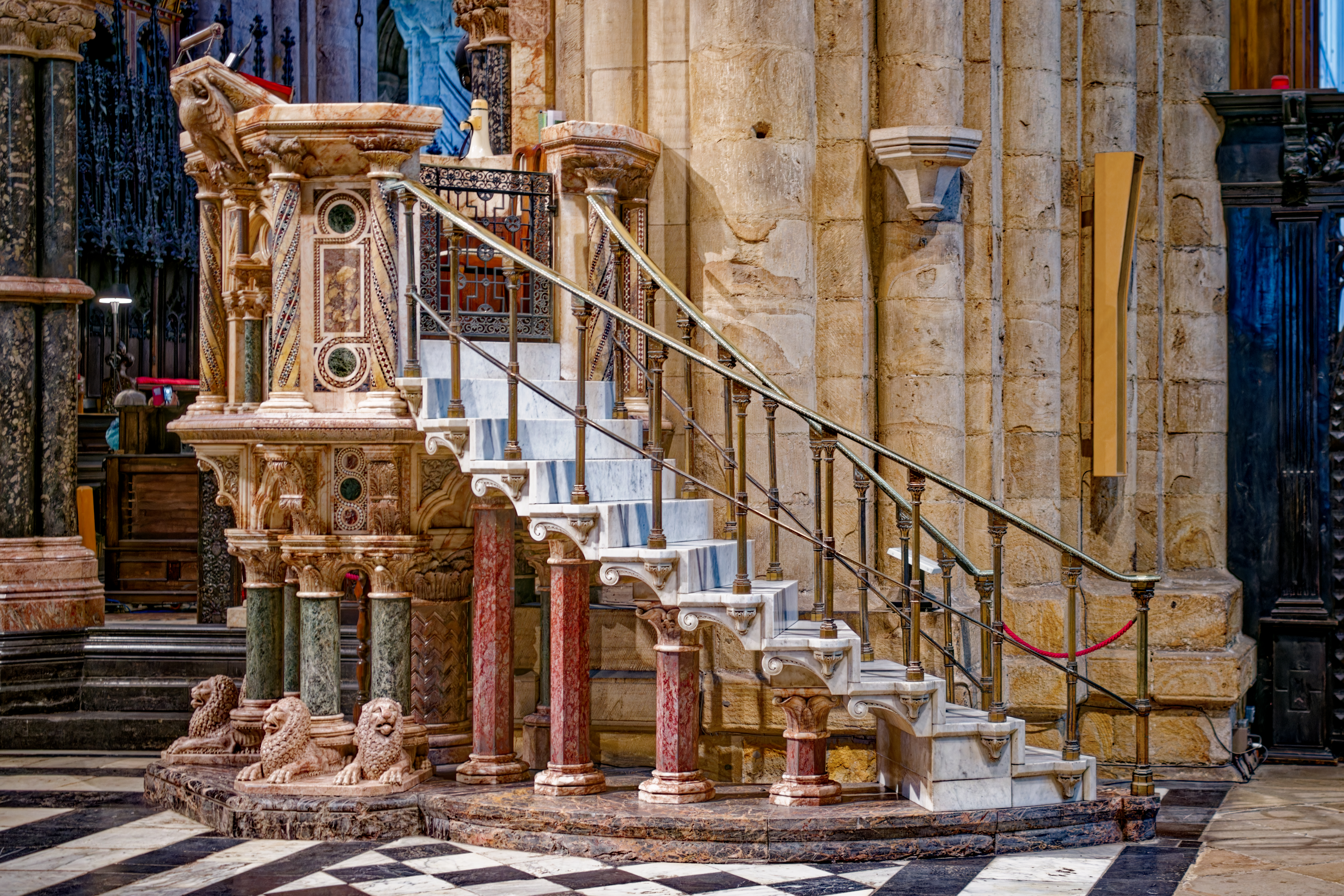
Pulpit

The Galilee chapel

The Nine-Altars chapel, with a contemporary Pieta by Fenwick Lawson in the foreground

A woman praying at the shrine of Saint Cuthbert

Tomb of Bishop Thomas Hatfield

Monument to John Neville

== See also ==
- Gothic cathedrals and churches
- English Gothic architecture
- Architecture of the medieval cathedrals of England
- List of church restorations and alterations by Anthony Salvin
- Durham Cathedral College
- Palace Green
- Late medieval domes

== Sources ==
- Allsopp, Bruce; Clark, Ursula (1969). Historic Architecture of Northumberland. Newcastle upon Tyne: Oriel Press. ISBN 0 85362 062 8.
- Brown, David (ed.) (2015) Durham Cathedral: History, Fabric and Culture. New Haven: Yale University Press.
- Clifton-Taylor, Alec (1967) The Cathedrals of England. London: Thames and Hudson
- Dodds, Glen Lyndon (1996) Historic Sites of County Durham Albion Press
- Harvey, John (1963) English Cathedrals. London: Batsford
- Moorhouse, Geoffrey (2008) The Last Office: 1539 and the dissolution of a monastery. London: Weidenfeld & Nicolson
- Myers, Benjamin (2023) "Cuddy". London: Bloomsbury Circus.
- Stranks, C. J. The Pictorial History of Durham Cathedral. London: Pitkin Pictorials
- Tatton-Brown, Tim (2002) The English Cathedral; text by Timothy Tatton-Brown; photography by John Crook. London: New Holland ISBN 1-84330-120-2
