= Durham Castle =

Norman castle in Durham, England

UNESCO World Heritage Site
- Durham Castle – view from the central tower of the cathedral

- Location within County Durham
- Location: Durham, England
- Part of: Durham Castle and Cathedral
- Criteria: Cultural: (ii), (iv), (vi)
- Reference: 370bis
- Inscription: 1986 (10th Session)
- Extensions: 2008
- Area: 8.79 ha (0.0339 sq mi)
- Coordinates: 54°46′29″N 1°34′34″W

Durham Castle is a Norman castle in the city of Durham, England, which has been occupied since 1837 by University College, Durham after its previous role as the residence of the Bishops of Durham. Designated since 1986 as a cultural World Heritage Site in England, along with Durham Cathedral, the castle is open to the general public to visit, but only through guided tours, since it is in use as a working building and is home to over 100 students. The castle stands on top of a hill above the River Wear on Durham's peninsula, opposite Durham Cathedral (grid reference NZ274423).

== History ==
=== Early history ===
Construction of the castle, of the motte and bailey design favoured by the Normans, began in 1072 under the orders of William the Conqueror, six years after the Norman Conquest of England, and soon after the Normans first came to the North. The construction took place under the supervision of Waltheof, Earl of Northumbria, until he rebelled against William and was executed in 1076. Stone for the new buildings was cut from the cliffs below the walls and moved up using winches.

The holder of the office of the bishop of Durham, Bishop Walcher at the time, was appointed by the king to exercise royal authority on his behalf, with the castle being his seat. Adding to his status by the purchase of the Earldom of Northumbria, Walcher began a line of prince-bishops which continued until the Bishops of Durham lost their temporal powers under the Durham (County Palatine) Act 1836. The prince-bishops were entitled to raise an army, levy taxes and mint their own coinage. The wide remit granted them by the English crown allowed them virtual autonomy to act as a defence both against Scottish incursions from the north, and internal rebellions.

Walcher continued the building of the castle, as a combination of bishops' palace and defensive stronghold. Inner and outer baileys and a keep were constructed. The earliest structures may have been of wood, but there is evidence of building in stone from the end of the 11th century. In May 1080, the castle was attacked and besieged for four days by rebels from Northumbria and Bishop Walcher was killed.

In the 12th century, Bishop Pudsey (Hugh de Puiset) built the Norman archway and the Galilee of the cathedral. In 1177, King Henry II of England seized the castle after a disagreement with de Puiset. Other major alterations were made by Bishop Thomas Hatfield in the 1300s, including a rebuilding of the keep and enlargement of the keep mount.

The castle has a large Great Hall, originally called a Dining Hall, created by Bishop Antony Bek in the early 14th century; Bishop Hatfield added a wooden minstrels' gallery. The hall was modified and enlarged, then reduced, in size by subsequent bishops. Today, the Hall is 14 metres (46 ft) high and over 30 metres (98 ft) long.

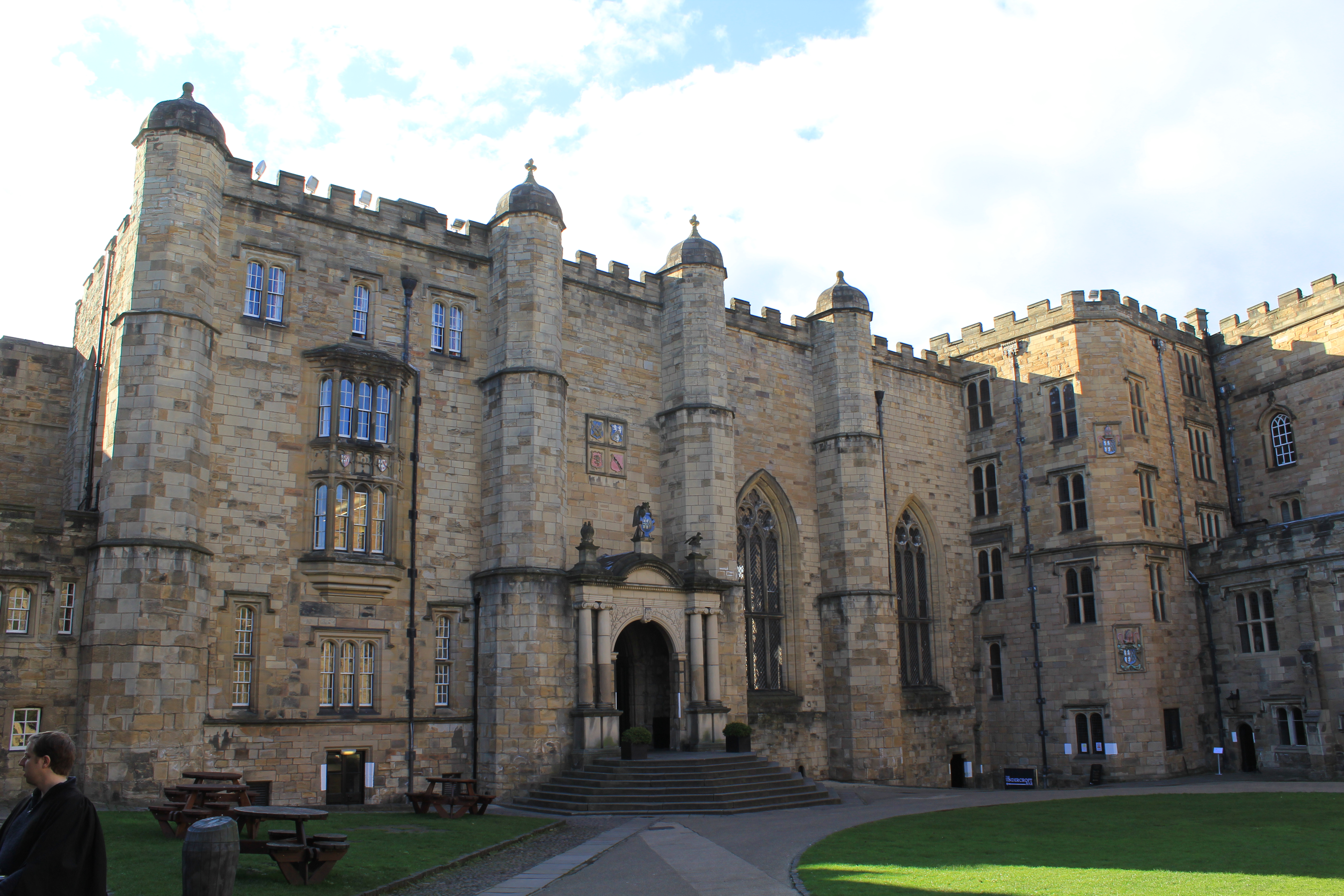
Entrance to Bishop Bek's Great Hall and interior view

=== University College ===
The Castle remained the bishop's palace for the Bishop of Durham until Auckland Castle was made the bishops' residence in 1832; the current bishop still maintains offices at that castle, roughly ten miles to the south. Subsequently, Durham castle was donated to the University of Durham by Bishop William Van Mildert and would later become the college. The college did not occupy the castle until 1837, after the next Bishop, Edward Maltby, had completed renovations of the building.

The cathedral was targeted for a Baedeker Blitz or bombing raid by Germany but escaped because fog rolled in and blocked the pilots' view.

== Architecture and description ==
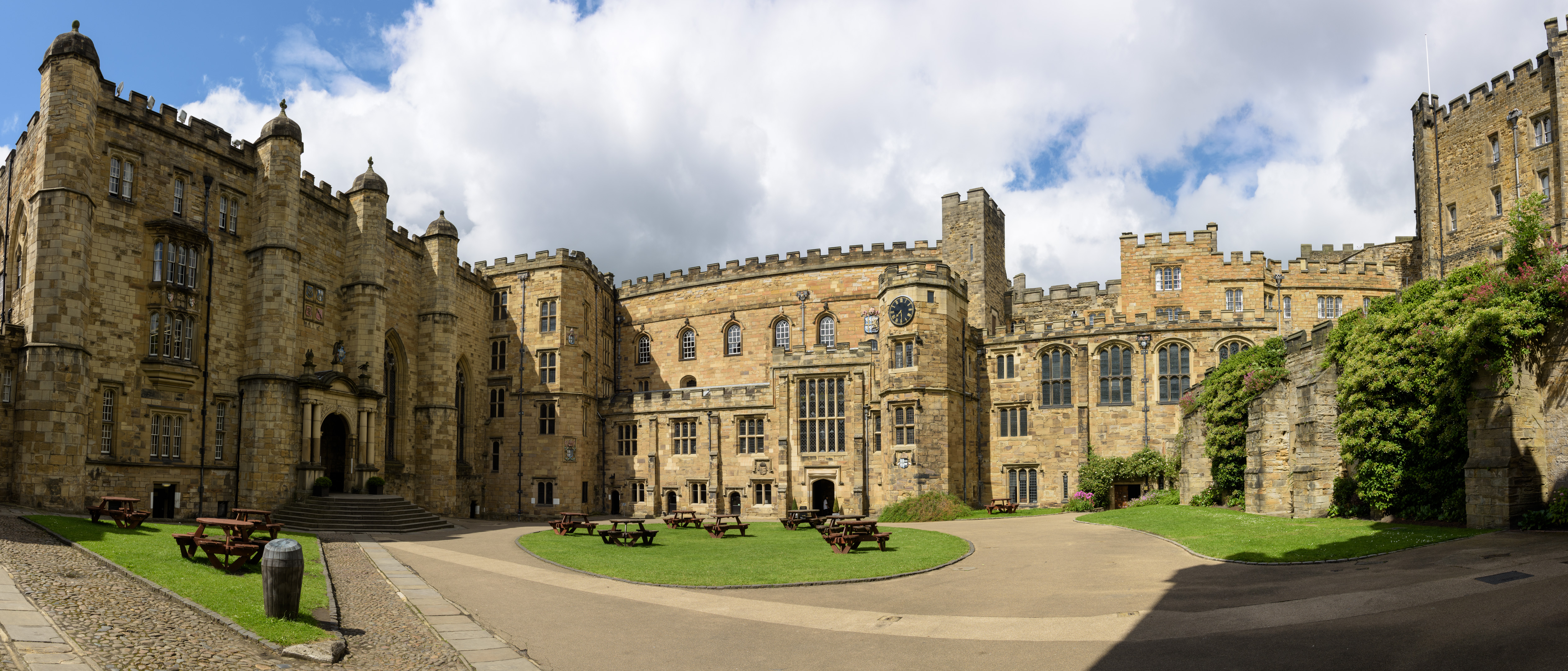
Durham Castle from the courtyard

=== Chapels ===
The Norman Chapel is the oldest accessible part of the castle. The exact date of its construction is unclear with 1075 or shortly after 1080 both being possible. Its architecture is Anglian in nature, possibly due to forced Anglian labour being used to build it. The chapel is in the form of a rectangle 32 feet 10 inches (10.01 m) by 20 feet 9 inches (6.32 m) in size. The ceiling is supported by six columns each with carved capitals. The chapel was originally built against the inside of the castle's inner baily wall.

In the 15th century, its three windows were all but blocked up because of the expanded keep. It fell into disuse until 1841 when it was used as a corridor through which to access the keep. During the Second World War, it was used as a command and observation post for the Royal Air Force. For the rest of the 1940s it was used as a bike shed. The chapel was re-consecrated in the 1950s and is still used for weekly services by the college. In the early 2020s the outer walls of the chapel were excavated to reduce problems caused by damp. It has been argued by David Rollason that the St Michael's church that William de St-Calais' body was laid in prior to his burial was the Norman chapel.

Tunstall's Chapel, named after the Bishop of Durham Cuthbert Tunstall, was built in the 16th century and is used for worship within the college. It was modified in the 17th century by Bishop Cosin.

A capital in the Norman chapel

Tunstall's Chapel

A misericord inside Tunstall's Chapel

== World Heritage status and historic listing designations ==
Durham Castle is jointly designated a UNESCO World Heritage Site with Durham Cathedral, a short distance across Palace Green.

The UNESCO report provides specifics about the Castle's important aspects:

Within the Castle precinct are later buildings of the Durham Palatinate, reflecting the Prince-Bishops' civic responsibilities and privileges. These include the Bishop’s Court (now a library), almshouses, and schools. Palace Green, a large open space connecting the various buildings of the site once provided the Prince Bishops with a venue for processions and gatherings befitting their status, and is now still a forum for public events.

Seventeen elements of the castle are listed, all at the highest Grade, I. These are: the keep, the north and west ranges, the entrance gatehouse, a bastion and twelve sections of the castle walls.

== Gallery ==
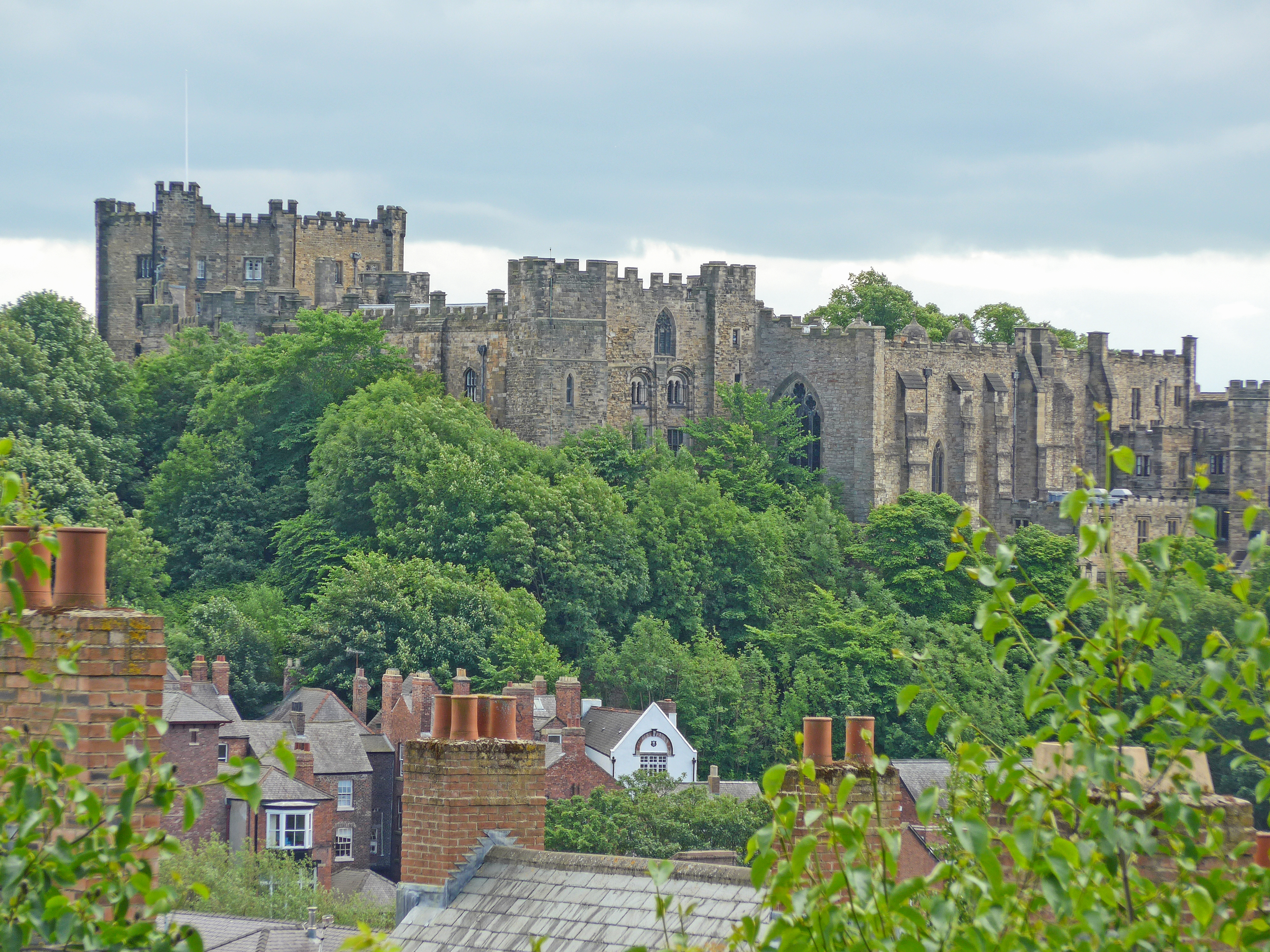
Durham Castle – view from across the River Wear

The entrance to the castle remodelled in the 18th and 19th centuries

The North building

The Keep

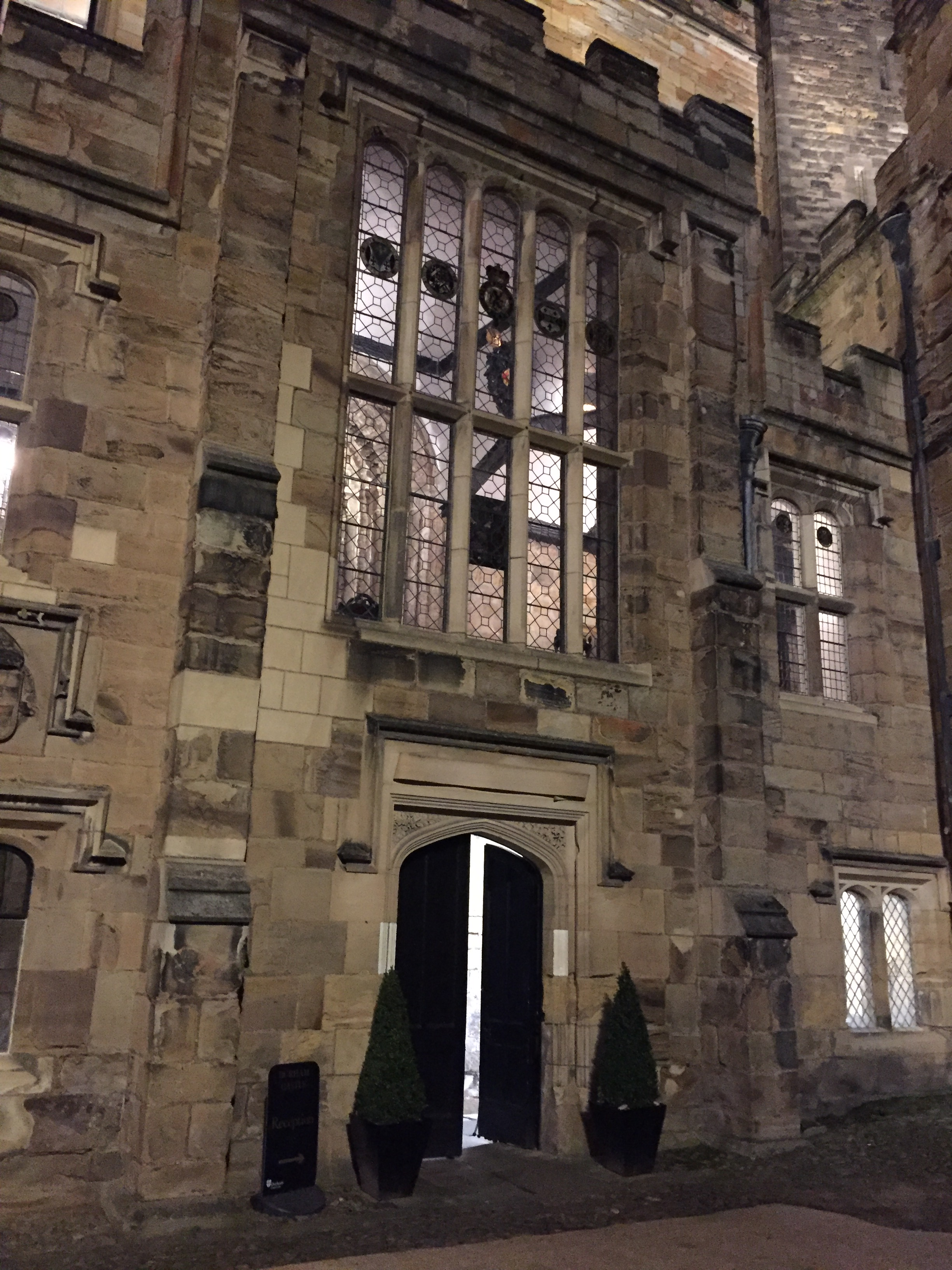
Window at the castle overlooking Palace Green towards Durham Cathedral

Great Staircase

Norman Arch

== See also ==
- Castles in Great Britain and Ireland
- List of castles in England
