= Galilee (church architecture) =

Porch of a Roman or Gothic style church

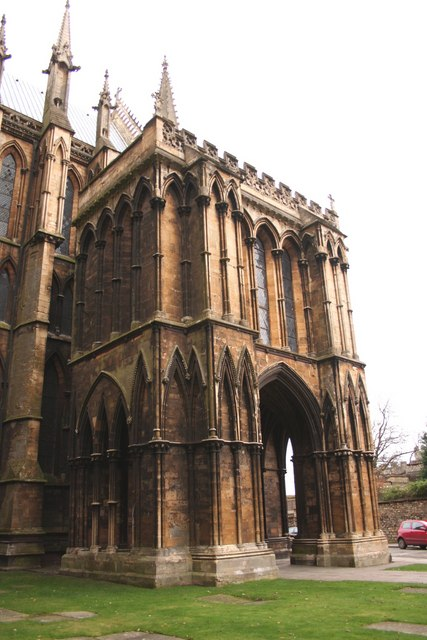
The galilee porch at Lincoln Cathedral

A galilee is a chapel or porch at the west end of some churches. Its historical purpose is unclear.

The first reference to this type of narthex is most likely found in the consuetudines cluniacensis of Ulrich, or the consuetudines cenobii cluniacensis of Bernard of Cluny, (See De processione dominicali). Since the definition of this type of narthex is ambiguous, this ecclesiastical structure can not be uniquely attributed to Cluny with certainty.

Examples of galilees remain at Durham Cathedral, Ely Cathedral, and Lincoln Cathedral. Ruined versions can be seen at Glastonbury Abbey and Rievaulx Abbey.

An episode from season 17 of British archaeological television series Time Team found possible evidence of the remains of a galilee at Westminster Abbey.
