= Prior Castell's Clock =

Astronomical clock in Durham, England

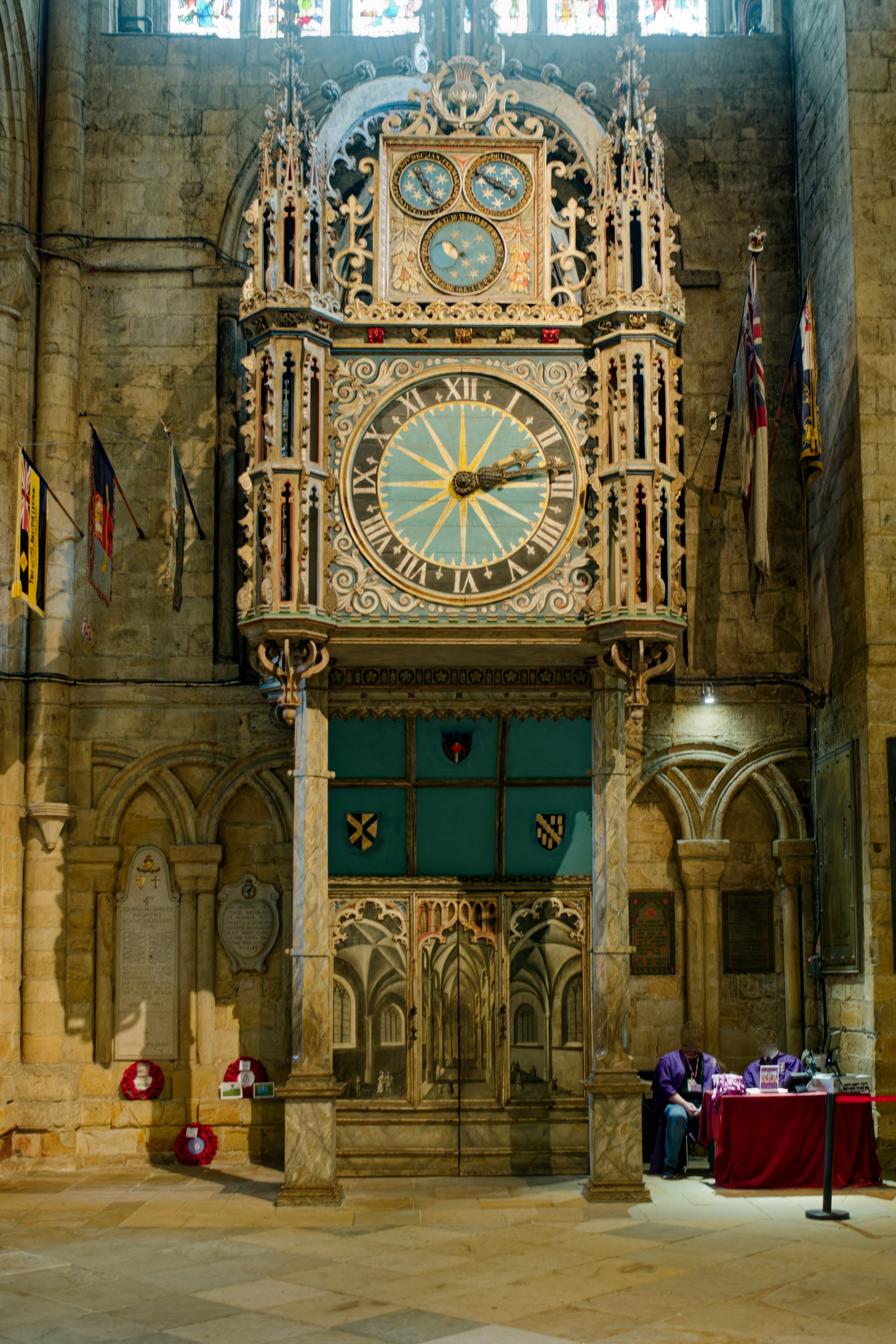
Prior Castell's Clock, Durham Cathedral

Prior Castell's Clock is an astronomical clock in Durham Cathedral.

== History and description ==
The clock was placed in the cathedral between 1494 and 1519, during the tenure of Prior Thomas Castell. Dean Richard Hunt renovated it between 1620 and 1638.

It was originally on the east side of the rood screen, but was moved in 1593 to its current location in the south transept.

In 1845, Dean George Waddington removed the clock case from the cathedral. A main part of the clock case was given to Pittington Hallgarth Church in County Durham in 1847. The clock mechanism was fixed in a blank window.

Parts of it were rediscovered in 1936 and Dean Cyril Alington launched a campaign to restore it. Mr. J. Armstrong from London, an expert in paint, was engaged in removing the layers of paint down to the original colouring.

In 1969 the cathedral installed a new heating system which caused the wooden supports for the clock to dry out and crack. Metal bands were put around the supports to prevent the clock from falling.
