= Palace Green =

UNESCO World Heritage Site
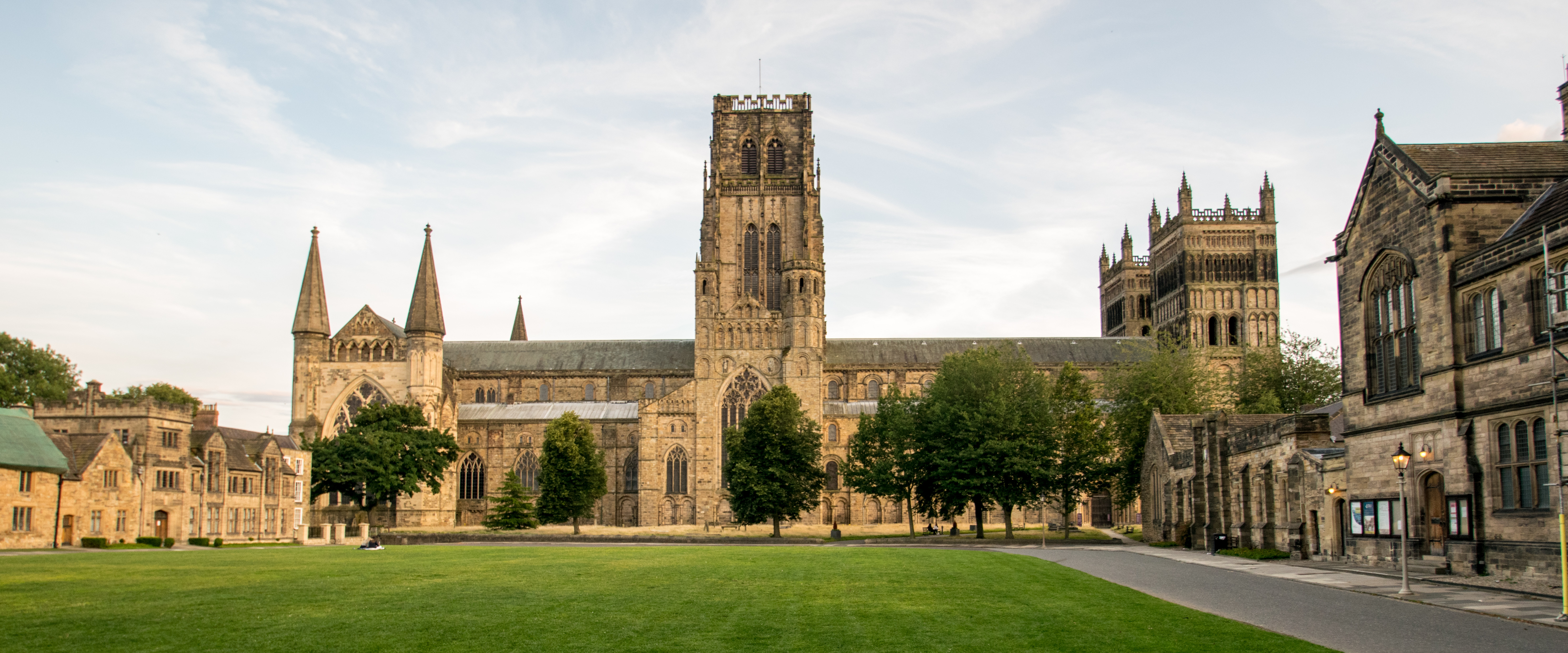
- Palace Green from opposite Durham Cathedral

- Location within Durham, England
- Location: Durham, England
- Part of: Durham Castle and Cathedral
- Criteria: Cultural: (ii), (iv), (vi)
- Reference: 370bis
- Inscription: 1986 (10th Session)
- Extensions: 2008
- Coordinates: 54°46′28″N 1°34′33″W

Palace Green is an open space in the centre of Durham, England, flanked by Durham Cathedral and Durham Castle. The Cathedral and Castle together form a UNESCO World Heritage Site.

Although initially not part of the site itself, Palace Green was added to the UNESCO site in 2008.

It is situated on top of the narrow, high peninsula formed by a sharp bend in the River Wear. The cathedral is on the southern side, facing the castle across the green on the north side. To the east are Durham University buildings including the law, theology, classics and history departments, with the music department and the university's special collections library to the west.

From the north and east Palace Green is accessed by two cobbled streets called Owengate (formerly Queen's Street) and Dun Cow Lane, the latter taking its name from a local legend involving a milkmaid and her cow. From the west a passageway, 'Windy Gap', leads down to the banks of the River Wear between two buildings which are now part of the university's music department. Early in the twentieth century one of the buildings was the home of the novelist J. Meade Falkner, author of Moonfleet.

In summer, Palace Green is sometimes used by students of Durham University as a croquet lawn with the permission from the groundsman of University College Durham.

'Palace Green' is also the name of a hymn tune written by Michael Fleming (1928–2006) while a music student at the university, used for the hymn 'Sing Praise to God Who Reigns Above'.

== History ==
Students resting on Palace Green

Palace Green served as the main market square of Durham until it was cleared under Bishop Flambard in the early 12th century, when the area was reserved for administrative buildings for the County Palatine of Durham and the market moved north to the current Market Place. A 14th century document refers to Palace Green as having "the houses intended for the offices of the Chancery, Exchequer, and Receipt; a hall for the Pleas of Justice; a granary; a large grange; and various other rooms on the west side of the said space pertaining to the old gaol before the lord built anew the tower called ‘le Northgate’ at the entrance to the castle where his gaols now are by his ordinance; and a house for coining money built on the east side of the said space", as well as the Archdeacon's Inn.

Two schools were established (one for plainsong and one for grammar) on the east side of the green by Bishop Langley in 1414 and were later refounded by Henry VIII in 1541 following the dissolution of Durham Abbey. Around 1438, Bishop Neville constructed the Exchequer building on the northwest corner of the green, which is the oldest surviving structure besides the castle and cathedral. During the English Civil War, the Scottish army captured Durham in 1640 and burnt some of the buildings on Palace Green, including the two schoolhouses. Following the restoration of the monarchy in 1660, Bishop Cosin built a number of structures on Palace Green, many of which survive today.

Following the establishment of Durham University in 1832, many of the buildings on Palace Green were handed over to its use and new buildings including lecture rooms (now Palace Green Library) were constructed.

The Durham Light Infantry held their final parade in front of their Colonel-in-Chief, Princess Alexandra, on Palace Green in 1968.

During the COVID-19 pandemic, marquees on Palace Green were used as a testing centre run by the university. It was also the site of a student encampment for 43 days in May and June 2024 as part of the global pro-Palestinian protests on university campuses that year.

== Buildings on Palace Green ==
Listed clockwise from south:

- Durham Cathedral – grade I.
- Divinity House, Durham University Department of Music (formerly grammar school) – grade II*.
- Durham University Department of Music technology suite (formerly music library) – grade II.
- Palace Green Library (original Durham University library, now houses special collections, exhibitions and a café) – grade II.
- Cosin's Library – grade II*.
- 15th century Exchequer Building (now part of university library) – grade I.
- Durham Castle (home of University College) – grade I.
- University College master's house – grade II.
- Moneyer's Garth (university stonemasons yard).
- Bailey Court (University College accommodation).
- Cosin's Hall (former college, now the university's Institute of Advanced Study) – grade II*.
- Bishop Cosin's Almshouses (until 2020 a café) – grade II.
- The Pemberton Rooms (the Durham Union Society) – grade II.
- Abbey House, Durham University Department of Theology and Religion – grade II.
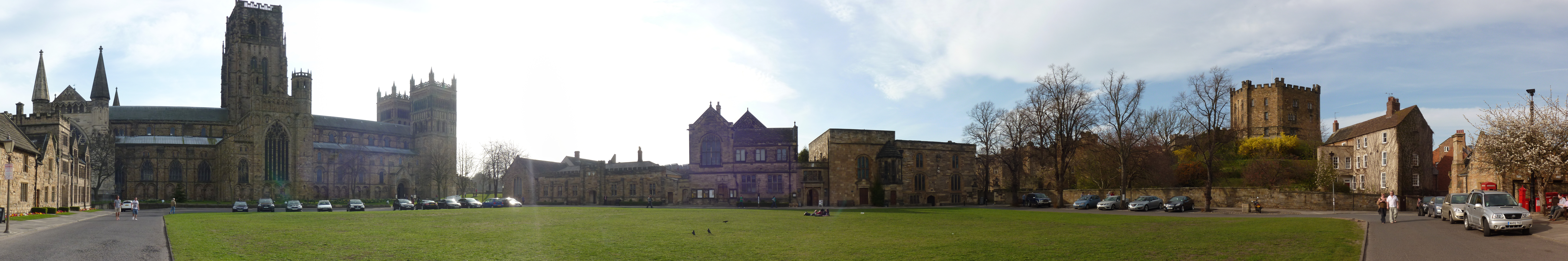
Panorama view of Palace Green, showing Durham Cathedral to the left, the old University Library in centre, and University College and Owengate to the right.

== See also ==
- Durham Cathedral
- Durham Castle
- Durham Castle and Cathedral
- Durham Cathedral College
- The Bailey
