= Henry Mellish School and Specialist Sports College =

The Henry Mellish School & Sports College

Location
- Highbury Road; Bulwell, Nottingham, Nottinghamshire, NG6 9DS; England; 52°59′36″N 1°11′18″W

Information
- Type: Secondary
- Motto: Tenax Propositi (Firm of purpose)
- Established: 1929; 97 years ago
- Closed: June 6, 2009; 17 years ago (Now The Bulwell Academy)
- Local authority: City of Nottingham
- Specialist: Sports and ICT
- Department for Education URN: 122878 Tables
- Ofsted: Reports
- Chair: R. Ogier
- Head teacher: Tony Bond (acting)
- Gender: Coeducational
- Age: 11 to 16
- Enrolment: 539
- Colours: Black and gold
- Publication: Mellish Mercury
- Replaced by: The Bulwell Academy

Henry Mellish School and Specialist Sports College was a small, non-denominational secondary school in Bulwell, Nottingham, England, situated in an area of high social deprivation.

== History ==
=== Grammar school ===
The school was founded as a boys' county grammar school in 1929 - the Henry Mellish Grammar School, and named after Eton-educated Henry Mellish, a British Army colonel and local councillor, who died two years prior to the opening. The school was sited near the Highbury Vale tram stop and opposite the Highbury Hospital on Highbury Road (B682).

The County Secondary School opened on Tuesday 17 September 1929, being officially opened on Friday 4 October 1929 by the sister of Henry Mellish, who had died in February 1927, the first Chairman of Notts Education Committee in 1903.

There were 214 at the school, with 91 in the first year. The headteacher was T O Balk. The school and equipment cost £50,000.

In the 1950s there would be around 2–3 hours of homework per night. The school was for Nottinghamshire, up to places such as Kirkby-in-Ashfield. There were many clubs and a Debating Society. Many went to prestigious universities.

==== Top of the Form ====
The school competed in the radio series Top of the Form in Heat 2 for England on Monday 8 October 1956 at 7.30pm on the Light Programme. The recording took place on 1 October. It lost against a grammar school team from the West Midlands. The team appeared on the front page of the Nottingham Evening Post on 21 September 1956.

The captain was David Leivers, 17, the head boy of 4 Upper Canaan in Ruddington, Bill Buxton (November 1943 - 14 September 2016) who studied Mechanical Sciences at St. John’s College, Cambridge, aged 12, of Attenborough, Michael Carson (c.1943 - 12 July 2018), aged 13, of 15 Meadow Close in Hucknall, who studied Geography at Cambridge, later Professor of Geography, at McGill University in Canada, and Roger S Hursthouse, 15 of 34 Little Green Road in Woodborough, who became a local businessman.

The team lost 34-48 against Brenda Emery, aged 17, and head girl and captain, Angela Clifton aged 14, Diana Herd aged 13, and Margaret Scaife aged 12. This team would win the whole competition, the first English team to do so.

David Leivers became a doctor, who went to University College Oxford, and trained in London.

=== Comprehensive ===
Labour rushed through comprehensive plans in September 1972, before the county would take over in April 1974. The school became a 11-16 coeducational comprehensive in 1974, so lost the 6th form, and had women teachers from 1974. The school only had women teachers in the war.

In 1974 the first year was 75 girls and 75 boys. The rest of the school had over 500 boys.

=== School specifics ===
Towards the end of its lifespan the subjects taught at the school were:

- English
- Maths
- Science
- Geography
- Textiles
- Art
- ICT
- PE
- Workshop

=== Closure in 2009 ===
The school was closed on 6 June 2009 in preparation for the opening of The Bulwell Academy. This merged the school with the other major educational institute in the local area, River Leen (formerly Alderman Derbyshire). Originally the merge of these two school was deemed unthinkable by local residents due to the overwhelming rivalry between the two schools.

Former Head Teacher, Mr. Graham Roberts has notably gone on to also be the head of the merged Bulwell Academy.

The close of the school came a shock to many current and former students, being one of the fastest improving schools in the city. Improvements such as the relatively new refurbished community sports college in which lessons would often take place.

During the transition into the new academy building, both of the yet unclosed school took temporary new names. Henry Mellish being chiefly renamed "Bulwell Academy Highbury".

== Academic performance ==
In November 1997, the school was the joint-18th worst school in England, with 6% getting 5 good GCSEs. William Crane Comprehensive School came joint-second worst in England with 2% having 5 good GCSEs, being joint-worst in England in 2003. In November 2000, the school came joint-27th worst school in England, with 9% having 5 good GCSEs. In November 2001 it came joint-17th worst in England, with 10%; William Crane had come joint-worst in England with 4%.

Henry Mellish School was judged to require special measures in 2005, but had since vastly improved - the school gained its specialist sports college status with information and communication technology (ICT) as a second specialism in March 2005. The schools GCSE results had improved dramatically over the previous six years, going from 13% of students achieving 5 A*-C grades in 2003 up to 65% in 2008 which made the school the 5th highest achieving secondary school in the city of Nottingham at the time.

== Alumni ==
- Luke Fletcher, cricketer

=== As Henry Mellish Grammar School ===
- Robin Bailey, actor
- Sir Neil Cossons OBE, chairman from 2000 to 2003 of the Royal Commission on the Historical Monuments of England (RCHME), Chairman of the Association of Independent Museums from 1978 to 1983, and President from 2001 to 2003 of the Newcomen Society
- Ian Hallam 1972 and 1976 Olympic bronze
- Dr Sidney Holgate CBE, mathematician who founded Grey College, Durham and was the son of the woman who named the Holgate School (Hucknall)
- Pete Luckett, Canadian presenter
- Robert Raymond, filmmaker in Australia
- Dave Rowberry, pianist (briefly) in The Animals
- Prof Peter J. Taylor, Professor of Geography from 1995 to 2010 at Loughborough University, Professor of Political Geography from 1970 to 1996 at Newcastle University

=== Former teachers ===
- James Boyden, Labour MP from 1955 to 1979 for Bishop Auckland, taught History for two years in the mid-1930s
- Wilfred Lawson, Director of Education of Nottinghamshire from 1963–71, and deputy director from 1948-63 (taught 1937-42)
