= Victor Watts =

British toponymist, medievalist, translator and academic

Victor Watts FSA FRHistS

Master of Grey College, Durham
- In office 1989–2002
- Preceded by: Eric Halladay
- Succeeded by: Martyn Chamberlain

Personal details
- Born: 18 April 1938
- Died: 21 December 2002 (aged 64)
- Citizenship: United Kingdom
- Education: Bristol Grammar School
- Alma mater: Merton College, Oxford; University of London

Victor Watts, FSA, FRHistS (18 April 1938 – 21 December 2002) was a British toponymist, medievalist, translator, and academic, specialising in English place-names. He served as Master of Grey College, Durham from 1989 until his sudden death in 2002. He had been a lecturer in English at Durham University from 1962, honorary director of the English Place-Name Survey from 1993, and editor of the Journal of the English Place-Name Society from 1996.

== Early life and education ==
Watts was born on 18 April 1938. He was educated at Bristol Grammar School, then an all-boys private school in Bristol. He studied at Merton College, Oxford, and at the University of London.

== Academic career ==
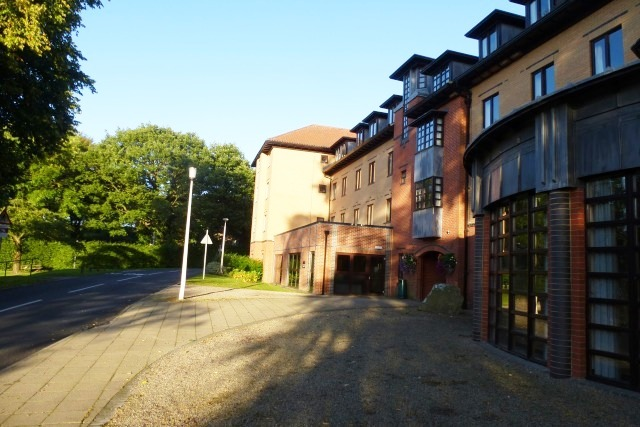
The Victor Watts Library at Grey College

In 1962, Watts jointed Durham University as a lecturer in English language. He was promoted to senior lecturer in 1974. His first association with Grey College, Durham was as a pastoral tutor. Then, from 1984 to 1989, he served as the college's senior tutor and vice-master. In 1989, he was appointed Master of Grey College. He was, by his death, one of the longest serving head of college at Durham University. He additionally served as Dean of Colleges, leading the university's 15 colleges, between 1999 and 2002.

Outside of his university, he held a number of positions. He was an active member of the Architectural and Archaeological Society of Durham and Northumberland: he served successively as vice-president and then president of the society between 1983 and 1991. In 1993, he was appointed honorary director of the English Place-Name Survey, and therefore of the English Place-Name Society, in succession to Kenneth Cameron. He served as general editor of the society's survey volumes from 1994, and was also editor of the Journal of the English Place-Name Society from 1996.

== Personal life ==
Watts had three children with his first wife, Mary Watts: two daughters and a son. Having divorced Mary, he later married Elaine; this marriage brought two stepsons.

Watts died on 21 December 2002, aged 64. He had had a heart attack.

== Honours ==
Watts had been elected a Fellow of the Royal Historical Society (FRHistS), and a Fellow of the Society of Antiquaries of London (FSA).

== Selected works ==
- Boethius (1969). The Consolation of Philosophy. Translated by Victor Watts. London: Penguin Books. ISBN 978-0140447804.
- Watts, Victor (2002). A Dictionary of County Durham Place-names. Nottingham: English Place-Name Society. ISBN 978-0904889659.
- Watts, Victor, ed. (2004). The Cambridge Dictionary of English Place-Names: based on the collections of the English Place-Name Society. Cambridge: Cambridge University Press. ISBN 9780521362092.
- Fuller, David, ed. (2005). Pearl. Translated by Victor Watts. London: Enitharmon Press. ISBN 978-1904634201.

Academic offices
Preceded by Eric Halladay	Master of Grey College, Durham; 1988 to 2002	Succeeded by Martyn Chamberlain
