= J. Michael Clarke =

British academic

Professor John Michael Clarke is Director of the Electroacoustic Music Studio at the University of Huddersfield. He graduated from St Chad's College, Durham.

As a composer his works (which include both acoustic and electroacoustic pieces, most often combining these media) have received many performances and broadcasts throughout the world. In 1983 Soundings (cello and tape) won the CIM France prize at Bourges, in 1984 Uppvaknande (computer generated tape) was awarded the Chandos Prize at Musica Nova in Glasgow and in 1997 he was awarded the Musica Nova Prize in Prague for the octophonic tape work Tim(br)e.

More recent works include Prism and Cascade for the trumpeter Stephen Altoft, Constellations (for piano, percussion and computer) commissioned for the Verblendungen festival in Belgium, ThreeFour for the Goldberg Ensemble and Enmeshed written for L a u t and premiered at the 2005 Sonorities Festival in Belfast. A CD of four of his works (Refractions, Mälarsång, Epicycle and Uppvaknande) is available under the collective title Refractions (MPSCD003).
