= Sidney Holgate =

British mathematician and academic

Sidney Holgate CBE

Master of Grey College, Durham
- In office 1959–1980
- Succeeded by: Eric Halladay

Personal details
- Born: 9 September 1918 Hucknall, Nottinghamshire, England
- Died: 17 May 2003 (aged 84)
- Education: Henry Mellish School; Hatfield College, Durham

Military service
- Allegiance: United Kingdom
- Branch/service: Royal Air Force
- Years of service: 1942 to 1945
- Unit: Royal Air Force Volunteer Reserve (Training Branch)
- Battles/wars: Second World War

Sidney Holgate, CBE (9 September 1918 – 17 May 2003) was a British mathematician and academic administrator.

== Biography ==
Holgate was born on 9 September 1918 in Hucknall, Nottinghamshire, England. He was educated at Henry Mellish School. He won a scholarship to Hatfield College, Durham, where he studied mathematics and eventually became "senior man" (i.e. president of the junior common room). He was also President of the Durham Union for Michaelmas term of 1940. He graduated with a first class honours Bachelor of Arts (BA) degree in 1940. He remained at Durham to train as a teacher and competed the Diploma in the Theory and Practice of Teaching (DThPT) in 1941.

Following the outbreak of the Second World War, Holgate was found unacceptable for wartime service on medical grounds. After graduation, he instead taught for a year at Nottingham High School. However, in 1942, he returned to Durham as a lecturer to teach mathematics and navigation to Royal Air Force aircrew cadets. As such, he was commissioned in the Royal Air Force Volunteer Reserve (Training Branch), serving from 1942 to 1945. During this time he continued his studies and completed a Master of Arts (MA) degree in 1943. He also undertook research "on the application of complex variables to problems in elasticity" and completed his Doctor of Philosophy (PhD) degree in 1945.

In 1946, Holgate became secretary of the Durham Colleges; in that role, he was the senior administrator of the University's colleges in the city of Durham, excluding King's College in Newcastle. He was then master of Grey College, Durham from its foundation in 1959. Grey College was the first postwar college established in Durham, and he oversaw its development from construction onwards. He additionally served as pro-vice-chancellor and sub-warden of Durham University from 1964 to 1969. He retired in September 1980, and was succeeded as master of Grey College by Eric Halladay.

In addition to his full-time work at Durham University, Holgate was involved with the Open University (OU) from its foundation until his retirement. He was a member of its academic advisory committee from 1969 to 1981, serving as its vice-chair from 1972 to 1975 and its chair from 1975 to 1977. The OU awarded him an honorary Doctor of the University (DUniv) degree in 1980.

In the 1981 New Year Honours, Holgate was appointed Commander of the Order of the British Empire (CBE).

Holgate married Isabel "Belle" Armorey in 1942. They did not have any children. He died on 17 May 2003, aged 84. He had been living in a nursing home in Durham at the time of his death.

Academic offices
New title	Master of Grey College, Durham; 1959–1980	Succeeded by Eric Halladay
