= Margaret Masson =

British academic

Principal of St Chad's College, Durham
- Incumbent
- Assumed office 2016
- Preceded by: Joseph Cassidy

Personal details
- Education: University of Aberdeen

Margaret Jane Masson is a British academic and the principal of St Chad's College at Durham University.

== Early life and education ==
Born and brought up in Zambia, Masson studied at the University of Aberdeen, graduating with a double first undergraduate Master of Arts (MA Hons) degree in English and Religious Studies. She undertook a Doctor of Philosophy (PhD) degree in the Department of English Studies at the University of Durham, under the supervision of Ruth Etchells. Her doctoral thesis, titled "The influence of Congregationalism on the first four novels of D.H. Lawrence", was submitted in 1988.

== Career ==
Masson began her academic teaching career in the United States, first at Whitworth College then at Calvin College, Grand Rapids, Michigan. In 1992, she returned to Durham University, having been appointed Senior Tutor at St John's College and lecturer in the University’s English Department In 2004 she became the Vice-Principal and Senior Tutor at St Chad's College, Durham. It was announced on 16 February 2016 that she would be the next Principal of St Chad's College in succession to Joseph Cassidy. She was formally installed as the college's tenth Principal during a service at Durham Cathedral in May 2016.

Masson was a board member and trustee of Traidcraft for many years, a member of the Leech Professorial Management Board, a member of the board of Ridley Hall, Cambridge, and is a Bishop's Reviewer for Ministerial Training in the Church of England.

== Personal life ==
Masson is married to Robert Song, Professor of Theological Ethics at the University of Durham. They have two grown-up children.

Academic offices
Preceded by Joseph Cassidy	Principal of St Chad's College; 2017 to present	Incumbent
