= Martyn Chamberlain =

British physicist and academic (1947–2025)

J. Martyn Chamberlain, FInstP (1947 – 9 May 2026) was a British experimental physicist and academic. Having taught at the University of Nottingham and the University of Leeds, he joined Durham University as Professor of Applied Physics in 2003. From 2003 to 2011, he was also the Master of Grey College at the university. He retired in 2011. He had two children with his wife.

Academic offices
Preceded by Victor Watts	Master of Grey College, Durham; 2003 to 2011	Succeeded by Thomas Allen
