= Gary Ferguson (literature scholar) =

American literature scholar

- Born: March 19, 1963 (age 63)
- Occupations: Scholar; academic

Academic background
- Education: St Chad's College, Durham (BA, PhD)

Gary Ferguson (born March 19, 1963), a specialist of French Renaissance literature and culture, is the Douglas Huntly Gordon Distinguished Professor of French at the University of Virginia. From 1989, he taught at the University of Delaware, where he held the Elias Ahuja Professorship of French from 2012 to 2015. He graduated from St Chad's College, Durham University, receiving a BA with first-class honours in 1985 and a Ph.D. in 1989.

He is the author of Mirroring Belief: Marguerite de Navarre's Devotional Poetry (Edinburgh University Press, 1992), Queer (Re)Readings in the French Renaissance: Homosexuality, Gender, Culture (Ashgate, 2008; London and New York : Routledge, 2016), and Same-Sex Marriage in Renaissance Rome: Sexuality, Identity, and Community in Early Modern Europe (Cornell University Press, 2016), as well as of numerous articles dealing in particular with questions of gender and sexuality, women's writing, devotional literature and the cultural history of religion. He has edited or co-edited a number of collections of scholarly essays, including (Re)Inventing the Past: Essays on French Early Modern Culture, Literature and Thought in Honour of Ann Moss (2003, with Catherine Hampton), Narrative Worlds: Essays on the ‘Nouvelle’ in 15th- and 16th-Century France (2005, with David LaGuardia), L’Homme en tous genres : masculinités, textes et contextes (2008), and A Companion to Marguerite de Navarre (2013, with Mary B. McKinley). He has also published a critical edition of Anne de Marquets's Sonets spirituels (Geneva : Droz, 1997).
