= Giles Ramsay =

British theatre director, producer and playwright

Giles Ramsay is a British theatre director, producer and playwright known for working to bring artists from developing countries to international attention.

He is Artistic Director of the theatre company Trident Theatre, Director of the charity Developing Artists, and a Fellow of St Chad's College, Durham. In 1985 Ramsay, in his capacity as Secretary of the Durham Union Society, offended politician and author Jeffrey Archer at the annual Union Society Dinner held at Hatfield College, when he suggested during a speech that Archer had only been invited as a special guest because David Owen was unavailable. He later served as President of the Union Society in 1987. He was also a member of sketch comedy group The Durham Revue.

Ramsay's work with Developing Artists has included productions in Zimbabwe, Mexico and Cape Verde,. He is currently working on long-term projects in Zimbabwe, Mexico and the Cape Verde Islands. Developing Artists continues to present work by international artists in the United Kingdom, often at the Edinburgh Festival Fringe.

== Plays ==
- Shall We Go to the Alhambra?
- Territory
- Only As Multiple
- Crocodile
