= Eric Halladay =

British historian, academic and rowing coach

Principal of St Chad's College, Durham
- In office 1991–1994
- Preceded by: David Jasper
- Succeeded by: Duane Arnold

Master of Grey College, Durham
- In office 1980–1989
- Preceded by: Sidney Holgate
- Succeeded by: Victor Watts

Personal details
- Born: 9 July 1930
- Died: 19 July 1997 (aged 67)
- Education: Durham School
- Alma mater: St John's College, Cambridge; Ripon Hall, Oxford

Eric Halladay (9 July 1930 – 19 July 1997) was a British historian, academic, and rowing coach. He was Master of Grey College, Durham from 1980 to 1989, Rector of St Aidan's College, Durham from 1990 to 1991, and Principal of St Chad's College, Durham from 1991 to 1994. He was a rowing coach at the Royal Military Academy Sandhurst, before becoming coach of the Durham University Boat Club when he was an academic at the university.

== Early life and education ==
Halladay was born on 9 July 1930 in Huddersfield, Yorkshire, England. He father, A. R. Halladay, was later an Anglican vicar. He was educated at Durham School, where he learnt to row on the River Wear. He studied history at St John's College, Cambridge and was a member of the Lady Margaret Boat Club. Following his graduation from the University of Cambridge, he studied theology at Ripon Hall, Oxford, for one year.

== Career ==
=== Military service ===
On 14 February 1949, as part of National Service, he was granted an emergency commission in the Royal Regiment of Artillery with the rank of second lieutenant. He served with the 5th Royal Horse Artillery. On 21 December 1951, he was transferred to the Supplementary Reserve officers and granted seniority in the rank of second lieutenant from 4 August 1950. On 7 June 1952, he was promoted to acting lieutenant. He was promoted to lieutenant on 9 July 1953 with seniority from 7 July 1952. On 22 July 1958, he was transferred to the Territorial Army Reserve of Officers.

In later life, he was active in ex-servicemen organisations. He served secretary of Durham City Division of SSAFA from 1977 to 1989. He was also a member of the North of England's Territorial Auxiliary and Volunteer Reserve Association from 1980 to 1996.

=== Academic career ===
Halladay began his academic career not as a lecturer but a teacher. He taught history at Exeter School, a private school in Exeter, Devon, from 1954 to 1960. In 1960, he was appointed a senior lecturer at the Royal Military Academy Sandhurst. While his main duties at the academy were to teach the officer cadets military history, he also coached the Boat Club.

He joined Durham University in 1964 as a lecturer in history. He specialised in military and African history. The same year, he was appointed senior tutor of Grey College, Durham. He co-wrote The Building of Modern Africa with D. D. Rooney which was published in 1966. He was appointed vice-master of Grey in 1967, therefore deputising to the then Master Sidney Holgate. He was promoted from lecturer to senior lecturer in 1969. In 1972, his book The Emergent Continent: Africa in the Nineteenth Century was published. In 1980, he became the second master of Grey College. As the head of college, he became a part-time lecturer. He then moved colleges, and served as Principal of St Chad's College, Durham from 1991 to 1994.

=== Rowing coach ===
In 1963, Halladay coached a team from the Royal Military Academy Sandhurst to win the Ladies' Challenge Plate. This was the first Henley Royal Regatta he would win.

Halladay coached the Durham University Boat Club (DUBC) from 1964. DUBC won the Ortner Shield at the Head of the River Race 18 times in 1966 to 1976 and 1978 to 1984.

He was chair of the Durham Regatta between 1982 and 1988. In 1993, he was elected a steward of the Henley Royal Regatta.

== Personal life ==
In 1956, Halladay married Margaret (née Baister). Together they had three children; two daughters and a son.

He died on 19 July 1997, aged 67.

Academic offices
Preceded by Sidney Holgate	Master of Grey College, Durham; 1980–1988	Succeeded by Victor Watts
Preceded by David Jasper	Principal of St Chad's College, Durham; 1991–1994	Succeeded by Duane Arnold
