= St Chad's College, Durham =

Constituent college of Durham University, UK

St Chad's College
- Durham University
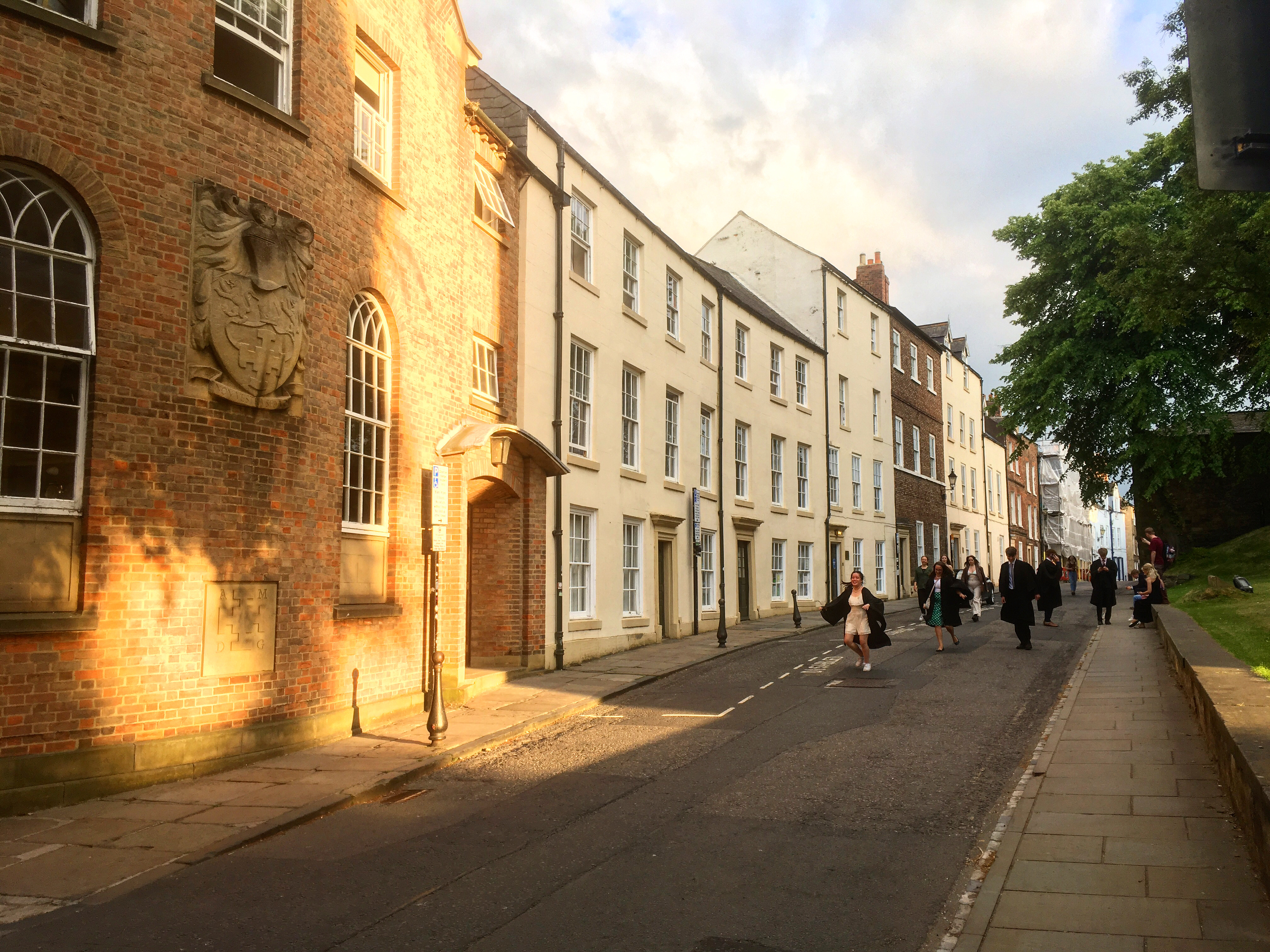
- Front view of Main College

- Arms of St Chad's College; Arms: Vert a Cross potent quadrate Or in chief a Durham Mitre of the last between two Lions rampant Argent
- Coordinates: 54.772925°N 1.5742°W
- Latin name: Collegium Sancti Ceaddae
- Motto: Latin: Non vestra sed vos
- Motto in English: Not what you have, but who you are
- Established: 1904; 122 years ago
- Named for: Chad of Mercia
- Principal: Margaret Masson
- Rector: Philip Plyming, Dean of Durham
- Chaplain: Vacant
- Undergraduates: 409
- Postgraduates: 150
- Visitor: Archbishop of York
- Website: stchads.ac.uk
- JCR: St Chad's JCR
- MCR: St Chad's MCR
- SCR: St Chad's SCR
- Boat club: St Chad's Boat Club

Map
- Location within Durham, England

St Chad's College is one of the recognised colleges of Durham University. Founded in 1904 as St Chad's Hall for the training of Church of England clergy, the college ceased theological training in 1971 and now accommodates students studying the full range of Durham University courses. Its members are termed "Chadsians" and it is the smallest Durham college by number of undergraduates, but has extensive college library facilities and among the highest level of academic performance.

The college's main site is on the Bailey, occupying historic Georgian buildings at the east end of Durham Cathedral. It neighbours Hatfield College to its north, while St John's College and St Cuthbert's Society are to its south. The college is named after Saint Chad, a seventh-century Anglo-Saxon bishop known for spreading Christianity in the Mercian kingdom.

Although Durham students study their degree centrally with the university, St Chad's runs its own collegiate studies and tutor system. College societies include the St Chad's College Boat Club (SCCBC), theatre company Green Door Productions, and the music society Chad's Music.

Gowns are worn by students for formal dining, matriculation and some other college activities, and its members still say grace in Latin. St Chad's has a traditional rivalry with the university's other recognised college, St John's, with an annual "John's/Chad's Day" featuring sporting competition between the two colleges. The college became fully mixed in 1988, after eight decades of admitting men exclusively.

== History ==
=== Hostel and hall ===
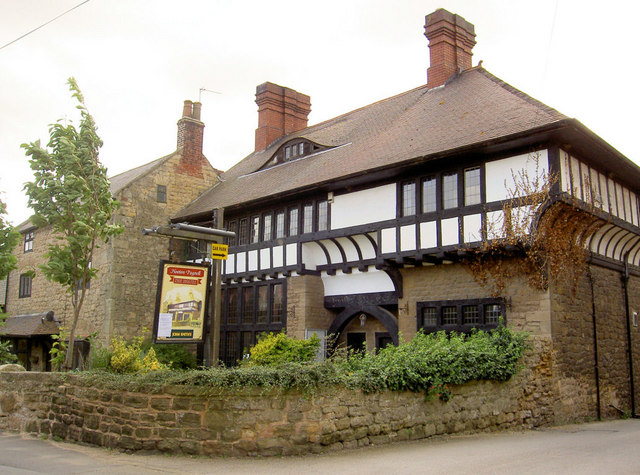
The former St Chad's Hostel in Hooton Pagnell

In 1902, Frederick Samuel Willoughby, vicar of Hooton Pagnell near Doncaster, opened St Chad's Hostel to prepare men of limited financial means for entry to Church of England theological colleges. He was supported by the lady of the manor, Julia Warde-Aldam, who in 1903 funded a dedicated building for the hostel in Hooton Pagnell.

The further financial support of Douglas Horsfall, a wealthy Liverpool businessman and devoted churchman (who also funded the building of several large Anglo-Catholic churches in his home city), made it possible in 1904 to establish a hall at Durham University as a sister institution to the Hooton Pagnell hostel, to allow students to read for university degrees alongside training for ordination. Durham University had a provision in its statutes to recognise independent colleges, permitting students to matriculate through those institutions and then to sit for Durham exams.

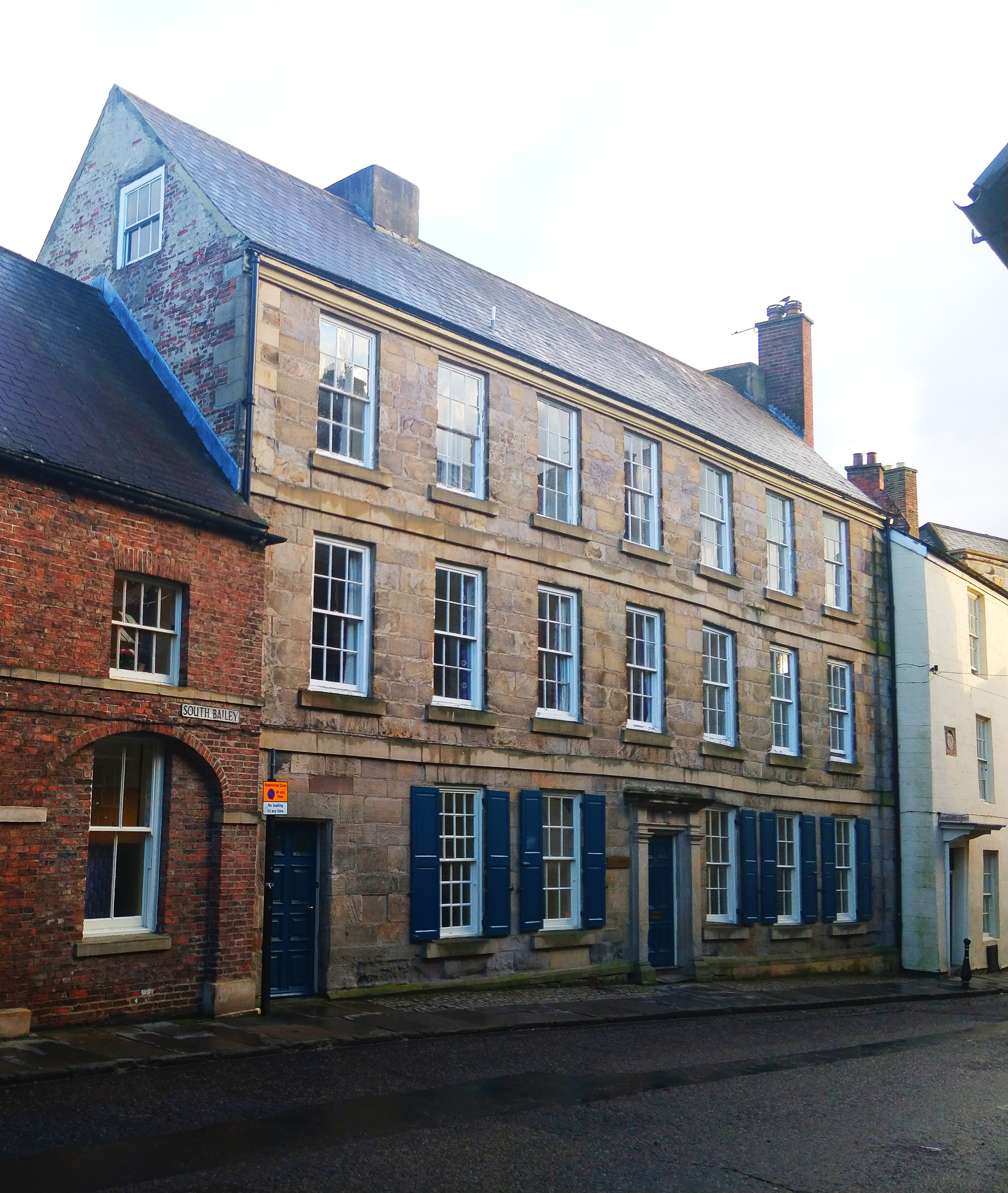
1 South Bailey was the first home of St Chad's Hall in Durham. On the left is the college's former second building. Both are now part of St John's College.

A licence from the university was obtained and St Chad's Hall opened in October 1904 at 1 South Bailey, Durham, with nineteen students. With the expansion to Durham, Willoughby withdrew from the project and the Revd Stephen Moulsdale, a Durham graduate who had been vice-principal of the hostel, became the first principal of the hall as well as principal of the hostel.

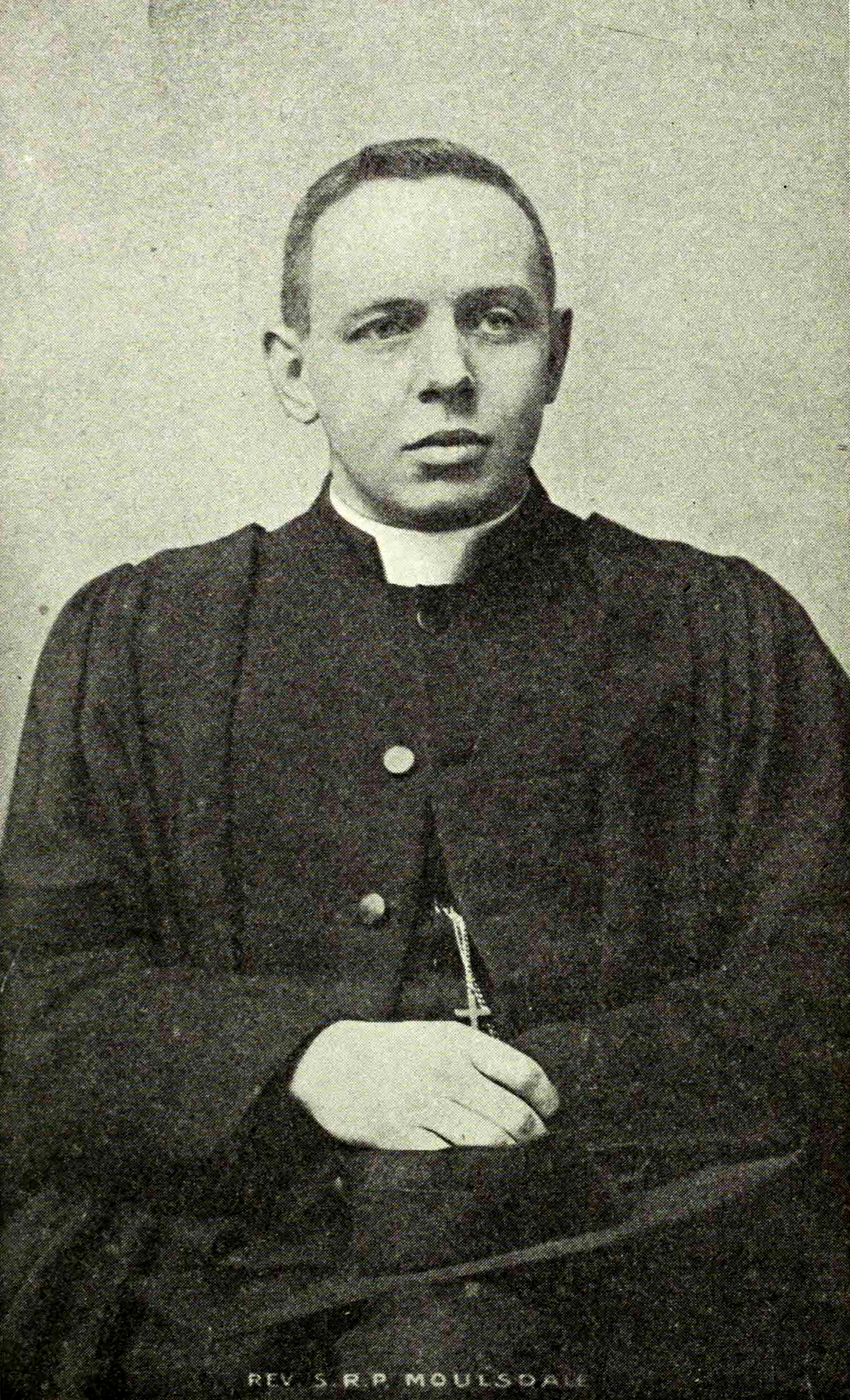
Founding principal Stephen Moulsdale

The college soon expanded into neighbouring buildings, starting with 28 North Bailey (adjoining 1 South Bailey) which was rented from the dean and chapter of Durham Cathedral. In 1909, a small wooden chapel was constructed behind the South Bailey buildings, and dedicated by the Bishop of Jarrow.

The Durham hall and Hooton Pagnell hostel continued to operate in partnership, with students studying for a year at the hostel before moving to the hall to complete their studies, until 1916 when the Hooton Pagnell building was requisitioned as a war hospital and all teaching was moved to Durham. The hostel building was returned after the war, and re-opened for a short time, but the financial problems of running in two locations led to the hostel finally closing in 1921.

=== College ===
In 1918, after the college had established a number of endowed fellowships, the university recognised St Chad's as the university's second college.

The college continued to expand with the lease and purchase of further buildings on the Bailey, including Douglas House at 18 North Bailey, purchased in 1925. In 1928, the current chapel (intended as a temporary building) was built behind Douglas House, with the previous chapel building given to found St Chad's Church, Sunderland.

In 1937, C. E. Whiting's centenary history of the university recorded that the college had 55 students and five staff, but could easily double its numbers if accommodation were available.

=== Consolidation on North Bailey ===
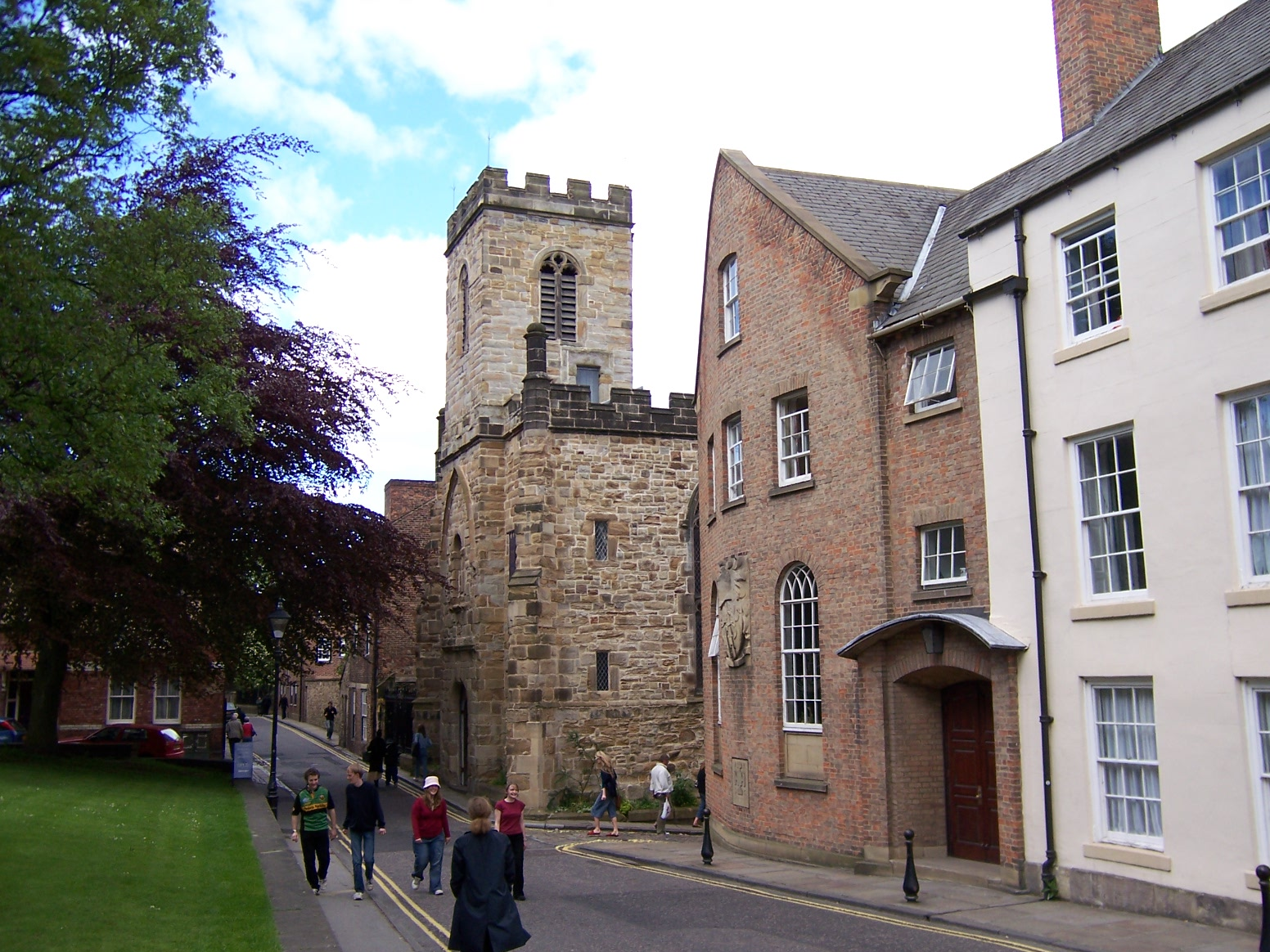
Johnson's dining hall, the former church of St Mary-le-Bow is beyond

In the 1960s, the college took steps to consolidate its site on North Bailey, with the houses at the junction of Bow Lane and North Bailey being demolished in 1961 to enable the construction of a new dining hall and quadrangle, designed by neo-classical architect Francis Johnson. These new buildings were joined to existing 18th century houses at 16–18 North Bailey to form the present Main College.

In 1965, the college's original home on South Bailey was exchanged with neighbouring St John's College for 22 and 22A North Bailey (now Grads House) which with other purchases gave the college a 95m-long frontage on North Bailey.

=== Later events ===
The college ceased formal ordination training in 1971, but remains a Church of England foundation with students studying for degrees across all departments of the university.

St Chad's was among the last university colleges in the UK to admit women undergraduates: as a part of a co-ordinated step-change in the university, the final all-male year entered in September 1987.

The college has continued to slowly expand, and new buildings have been acquired to allow for this increase, including former Durham School boarding house Trinity Hall as postgraduate accommodation, and additional houses on North Bailey.

I have always loved Saint Chad's College and it has been a joy to see the college go from strength to strength.... My spiritual home in Durham since 1939, Saint Chad's College represents to me the wholeness of faith and practice so needed in the universities and in the nation."

— Archbishop Michael Ramsey,

== Buildings ==
Students who study at St Chad's are accommodated in nine different houses: Queen's Court, Epiphany House, Main College, Lightfoot House, Langford House, Grads and Ramsey House and Trinity Hall all accommodate undergraduates; Hallgarth Street and Trinity Hall, along with part of Main College, are home to the college's postgraduate community.

Most of the college buildings are Grade II listed. Grade I listed 12th-century castle walls run through the college's gardens.

=== North Bailey ===
==== Main College ====
The 1961 dining hall

Main College is located at 18 North Bailey, adjacent to Bow Lane, and consists of the college dining hall (the Moulsdale Hall), designed in 1961 by neo-classical architect Francis Johnson, joined to a number of primarily 18th-century houses along North Bailey.

At the centre of Main College, adjacent to the Moulsdale Hall, is the Cassidy Quad. This was originally an open quadrangle between buildings, but was given a glass roof for the college's centenary in 2004. Main College houses the college's major public areas, including the Junior, Middle and Senior Common Rooms (JCR, MCR and SCR), bar, libraries, the punishment chamber (gymnasium), and most college offices.

The college's croquet lawn, chapel and laundry are behind main college, along with walled gardens associated with the historic houses that make up the college.

A graffito on the Bow Lane side of the dining hall reads "Pulchra Semper" (Latin: always beautiful), and has been in place since at least the 1970s.

==== Queen's Court ====
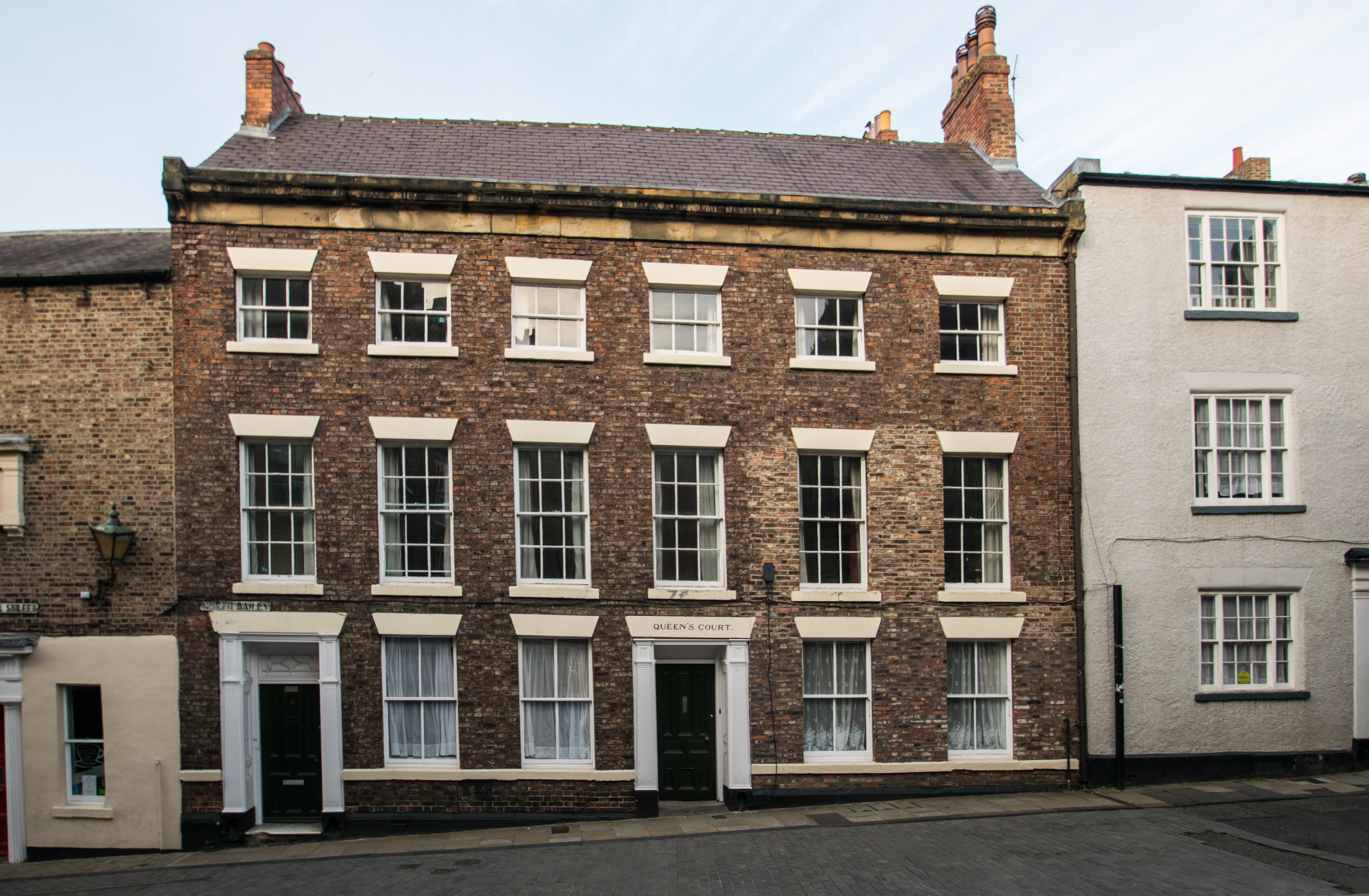
Queen's Court, 1–2 North Bailey

Queen's Court, 1 and 2 North Bailey, is a grade II listed building located at the junction between Saddler Street, North Bailey, and Owengate. It was built in the early 19th century and contains 24 student rooms. The college for many years occupied only 1 North Bailey, while no. 2 housed the Music Department. The two parts were reunited in 2013.

==== Epiphany House ====
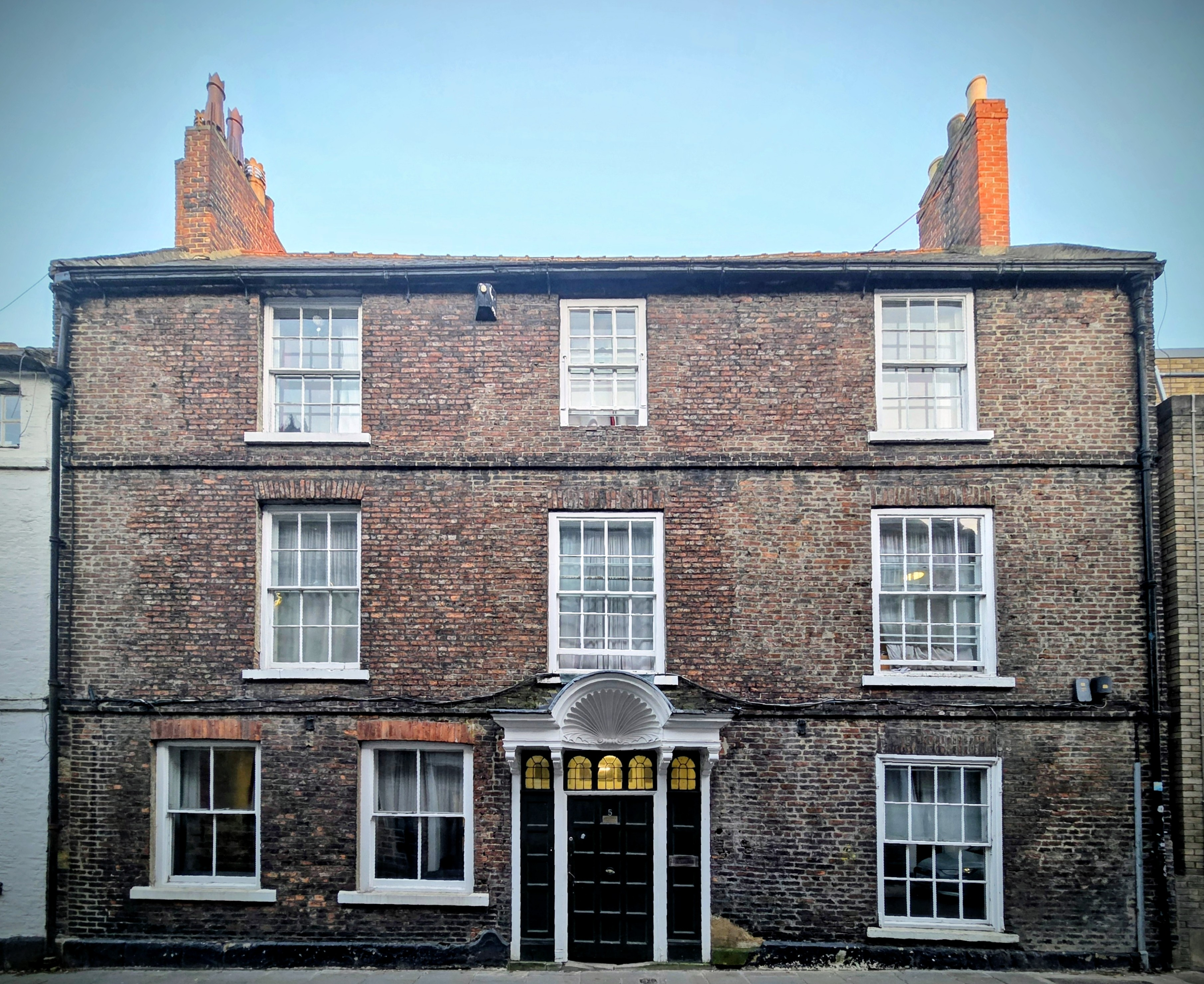
Epiphany House, 5 North Bailey

Epiphany House, 5 North Bailey, is a Grade II listed house built around 1700 and acquired by the college in 2006 to house undergraduates.

==== Lightfoot House ====
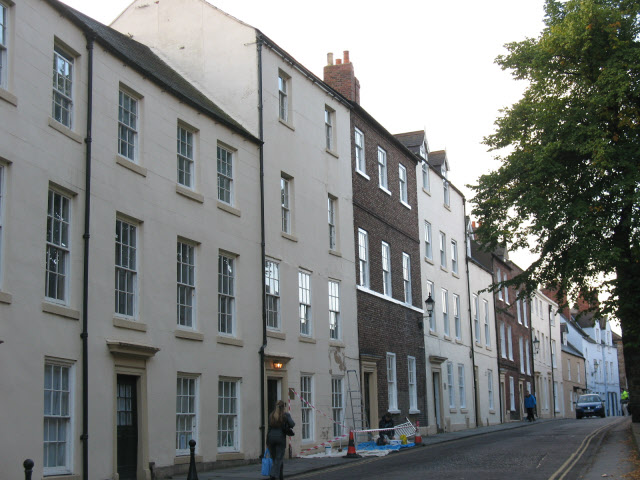
The college's 17th and 18th-century houses at 18-22a North Bailey (from left Main College, Lightfoot, Langford, Grads). Ramsey House is behind the blue building on the right of the shot.

Lightfoot House, 19 North Bailey (directly across the road from Durham Cathedral) is one of the buildings that comprise the college. It consists of two adjacent Grade II listed buildings that were constructed in the 18th century and have since been connected internally. The building is used as a hall of residence for first-year and third-year undergraduates. It is named after Joseph Barber Lightfoot, who was Bishop of Durham from 1879 to 1889.

==== Langford House ====
Langford House, 21 North Bailey, is a Grade II listed building built in the 18th century and named after a former Judaism scholar and College Chaplain. For many decades, it was the home of the college's chaplains, but today is used as a hall of residence for third year (and some first year) undergraduate students.

==== Grads House ====
Grads House, 22 North Bailey, is a Grade II listed building used as undergraduate accommodation. The building is largely late 18th-century, with a rainwater head dated 1796, but it contains a notable 17th century staircase. Its name derives from its use in the 1960s and 70s as a residence for students studying for postgraduate diplomas in Theology.

==== Ramsey House ====
Ramsey House, 25 North Bailey, is a Grade II listed building built around 1820, now owned by the college and now used primarily for undergraduate accommodation. It is named for Arthur Michael Ramsey, the 100th Archbishop of Canterbury who was once resident in Ramsey House. He was also a member of the Governing Council for the college.

For many decades, Ramsey House was the home of successive college principals, but it is now given over to student accommodation. There are now seven student rooms, a well-equipped kitchen, a self-contained fellows' flat, and the Ann Loades room, available for meetings.

=== Other sites ===
==== Trinity Hall ====
Trinity Hall is a former Durham School boarding house, located on Grove Street, across the river from the main college site. It was built in 1847 as the Second Master's House, later called Caffinites after Benjamin Charles Caffin, Second Master from 1863 to 1877, before becoming the school's junior house under the name Ferens House. It was acquired by the college in 2002 and converted into housing for 25 postgraduates and a house for the college principal. In 2017 the principal's house was converted into additional student accommodation.

==== Hallgarth Street ====
30 Hallgarth Street, located across the river from the main college site, is a Grade II listed building constructed around 1840. Formerly the college chaplain's house, it is now used as postgraduate accommodation.

=== Libraries ===
There are three library rooms on the ground floor of Main College (the Bettenson Room and the Brewis and Williams Libraries). The Williams Library doubles as a multi-media room and is often used for meetings and lectures. There are two more libraries on the first floor: the Wetherall Library, which houses most of the theology and philosophy collections; and the Reserve Library, which contains the core curricula texts for all of the courses currently on offer in the university (as well as the special church history and liturgy collections). The Fenton Library and the Trounson Library, which opened in October 2006, are located on the third floor. Comprising three separate rooms, the Fenton and Trounson Libraries contain individual study carrels and are used primarily for private study. The college is unusual (in the Durham collegiate context) in the extent to which it has invested in libraries and study space.

The Durham University Library holds most of the college's medieval manuscripts and its oldest books, which include a number of 16th and 17th century imprints including Quintus Aurelius Symmachus's Epistolae familiares and the Concilia omnia.

=== Chapel ===
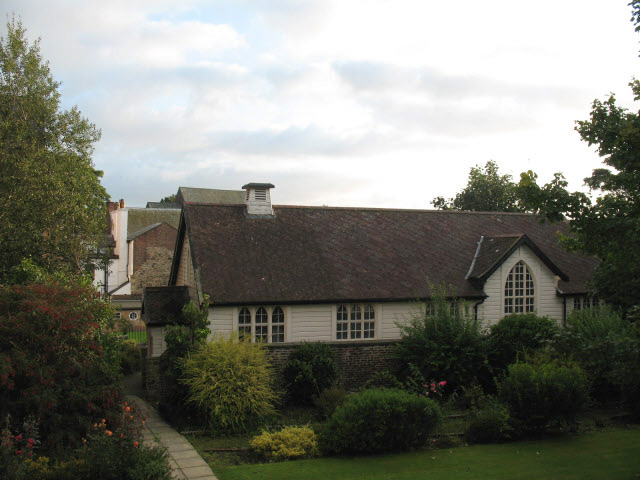
The chapel, as seen from the garden behind Lightfoot House

The college chapel, located behind Main College, was built in 1928, replacing an earlier chapel built on South Bailey in 1909. Intended only as a temporary building, the wood-frame building seats 120 people and has been in continuous use. The chapel's contents are older than its structures, with older donated pews from various churches and a ballroom dance floor from a decommissioned ocean-liner. The architecture of the chapel has been described as bearing resemblance to a "colonial mission chapel". Its reredos of 1923 was designed by William H. Wood.

In 2023, the chapel underwent a thorough refurbishment including a new roof, the restoration and replacement of all damaged segments of its wooden cladding, new lighting and heating systems. This project was paid for in its entirety by the generosity of alumni, supporters and a number of Trusts and Foundations; the names of all who contributed may be seen on a Donors' Board inside the Chapel.

The chapel is overseen by the college chaplain, an Anglican priest. The college's roots in the Catholic tradition of the Church of England are still evident in services in the college chapel. Chapel attendance is entirely voluntary, given that the college accepts students without regard to their religious background.

The college maintains a collegiate choral tradition, headed by the director of music. Membership in the college choir is un-auditioned, except for those wishing to be gain a choral scholarship. The choir is involved in the College's outreach work amongst schools and other organisations in the North East and, when possible, goes on tours. The college offers a number of choral and organ scholarships every year.

=== Boat house ===
The college's boat house is located on college-owned land on the banks of the River Wear, below the college's original home at 1 South Bailey, now part of St John's College. In 2016, the boat house and landing stage were completely replaced.

== College life ==
=== Academic dress ===
Along with most Bailey Colleges, St Chad's students wear their college gowns to formal hall, matriculation, college congregations and other academic or formal events. St Chad's has also retained its own distinctive academic hood (of black stuff with green lining and trim): previously designed for pre-1970s ordinands, the hood is today worn by honorary fellows. The rector has a distinctive robe (a full-sleeved gown of black corded silk, faced with silver-trimmed palatinate purple, and with sleeves lined with palatinate purple); college officers generally wear the academic regalia associated with their highest degrees.

=== Formal hall ===
Twice a week throughout most of the whole academic year, members of the college gather for formal hall. This tradition brings students and staff together, though fellows, tutors and their guests sit at high table. This not only enables students who are living out to visit college, but it enables the college to entertain official guests regularly.

Members of the college are required to wear academic gown to formal hall and are turned away and fined when entering the hall late, that is, after High Table have entered. Students and guests stand when the bell signals that the High Table party is arriving. Everyone shall remain standing until a senior student (usually JCR/MCR President, or whoever is presiding at Low Table) says the Grace:

Latin	English
SENIOR STUDENT: Benedictus benedicat, per Jesum Christum Dominum nostrum.	May the blessed one be blessed, through Jesus Christ our Lord.
RESPONSE: Amen.	Amen.

Students are usually refrained from standing throughout the meal, and if must do so for an urgent matter, should stand up and catch the eye of the Principal (or whoever is presiding at High Table) and bow towards them. Once bell sounds at the end of the meal, all students stand again for the evening Grace, remaining standing until after the high table party leaves. A senior student would then recite:

Latin	English
SENIOR STUDENT: Benedicto benedicatur;	Let a blessing be given by the Blessed One;
RESPONSE: Deo Gratias, Amen.	Thanks be to God, Amen.

The tradition of "pennying", as part of a meal or drinking game, whereby dropping a penny in a person's drink means that they must finish it (or some such variation thereof) is banned at St Chad's College, with risk of possible expulsion from the dining hall by staff members and even fines.

=== Traditions and customs ===
Along with many of the ancient colleges, St Chad's has evolved its own traditions and customs over the centuries.

Though all Durham University students now participate in large matriculation ceremonies in the cathedral, St Chad's has, for over a hundred years, conducted its own matriculation. This signifies that students are obliged to follow the regulations of both the university and of the college. Matriculants wear academic dress at the ceremony and every student signs the university's matriculation book, thereby sealing an oath to adhere to the rules and traditions of the college and the university.

For over a half-century, the college has conducted an Advent procession in Durham Cathedral. The candle-lit choral service is unusual in not solely anticipating Christmas, but in anticipating the Second Coming, which is the traditional theological focus of the Advent season itself. The choir splits into two, with one group seated in the choir and the other processing from the entrance to the cathedral. The two groups call back and forth to each other, using chants based on the Great Advent Antiphons. These antiphons form the basis not only of the advent procession, but also of the popular advent hymn, "O come, O come, Emmanuel". The procession is advertised widely in the City of Durham; after the event the college hosts its annual reception for city residents.

The patron saint of the college is Saint Chad of Mercia. On his feast day (2 March), the college features a day-long celebration and begins early in the morning with a noisy wake-up call. After a green breakfast, students wear green clothes and body paint to various events and challenges held throughout the day, including a large mass service in Durham Cathedral and a noon-day run around Palace Green. Various musical and social events are held throughout the day and evening. The college also has a number of feasts throughout the year. Both the Dining Hall and the Quad are used to provide a four-course meal for up to 250 people. Among the largest is the Principal's Feast, usually scheduled at the end of the Epiphany term. The Rector's Feast, at the end of the Easter term, welcomes the rector to the college for a formal "visitation".

=== Bars ===
St Chad's College has two bars - one its traditional cellar bar which is an atmospheric social hub built into the College's cellars, the second a more recent addition in the College's central Quad. The St Chad's Bar is one of the few remaining college bars still run by full-time undergraduate students elected by the student body.

=== Junior Common Room ===
Most undergraduates are members of the Junior Common Room (JCR). The JCR committees are elected by the members of the JCR through a Husting, with these committees running events, aspects of student life and representing JCR members at various levels. As of August 2021, the JCR has the following committees:

- JCR Executive – Has overall responsibility for the activities of the JCR. Consists of the President, Vice-President, Wellbeing Officer, Secretary, Treasurer, Domestic Representative, Bar President, Social Secretary, Representatives' Committee Chair, Sports Officer and the Chair.
- Bar Committee – Runs the college bar. Consists of the Bar President, Manager, Secretary, Treasurer and Head Cellarman.
- Social Committee – Runs social events throughout the course of the year. Consists of the Social Secretary, Secretary of the Social Committee, Treasurer, Decorations Officer, Technical Officer and Sponsorship & Publicity Officer.
- Wellbeing Committee – Responsible for running campaigns, providing sexual health supplies, signposting and running wellness events around periods of intense academic pressures. Consists of the Welfare Officer, Assistant Welfare Officer, Campaigns Officer(s) and Livers-Out Officer(s).
- Wine Cellar Committee – Sells wine before formals as well as hosting events throughout the year. Consists of the Keeper of the Cellar, Treasurer, Steward(s) and Assistant Steward(s).
- Charities Committee – Fundraises for charities, operates the toastie bar and organises volunteering. Consists of the Charities' Committee Chair, Treasurer, Outreach Officer, Secretary, Publicity Officer, Toastie Bar Manager, Toastie Bar Head Chef.
- Green Committee – Active in ensuring the College community does all it can to be environmentally sustainable.
- Representatives Committee – Responsible for furthering the interests and concerns of members of marginalised communities. Consists of the Representatives Committee Chair, the Disabilities Officer(s), the Women's Officer, the International Officer(s), the LGBTQIA+ Officer(s), the People of Colour Officer(s), the Social Mobility Officer(s), the Outreach Officer(s), and the Junior College Representative(s).

Other smaller JCR committees include the Candlemas Ball, Sports Committee, and Charity Fashion Show amongst others.

=== Middle Common Room ===
Most if not all postgraduates (consists of all the PhD, MPhil, MA, MSc, and LLM students and students on a four-year Integrated Master's programme) are members of the Middle Common Room (MCR). Similar with the JCR, the MCR executives are elected by members of the MCR, and is the representative body for postgraduate students at St Chad's College. With 150 postgraduates each year, St Chad's enjoy the highest proportion of postgraduates studying and researching alongside undergraduates in any Durham colleges. St Chad's MCR is particularly active in research and host regular "Research Forums" where students have the opportunity to present their research to a non-specialist audience. Under its Constitution and Standing Orders, the MCR is governed by the following executives:

- President of the MCR (ex officio Governor) – exercise overall responsibility for furthering the Aims and Objectives of the MCR through liaison with the Executives of the JCR and SCR, and any other bodies within the University. The President of St Chad's MCR is also ex officio Governor of St Chad's College.
- Secretary of the MCR – administer and take, distribute and file the Minutes of all General Meetings of the MCR and of the Executive Committee. They are also responsible for communicating business of the MCR to its members.
- Treasurer of the MCR – administer the finances of the MCR and is responsible for preparing quarterly reports for the scrutiny of College committees.
- Six Other Executive Officers – six other Executive Officers is elected and take such responsibilities as necessary for the smooth running of the activities of the MCR.
- Chair and Keeper of the Great Seal of the MCR – The Chair of the MCR is an administrative post not of Executive rank in the MCR of St Chad's College. It holds responsibility to preside over all General Meetings of the MCR and ensure that the Great Seal of the MCR is not to be removed from the City of Durham, hence its title.

=== Societies and events ===
St Chad's College Boat Club blade

St Chad's College Boat Club (SCCBC) is the college rowing club and was founded in 1906. It operates from the college boathouse on the River Wear. SCCBC is a registered Boat Club through British Rowing, with Boat Code "SCH" and is a member organisation of Durham College Rowing.

2011 saw the re-establishment of a theatre company at St Chad's, Green Door Productions, which aims to promote all aspects of theatre within the college, be it acting, directing, set design or backstage work. In 2011, Australian actor Russell Crowe visited the college to give a masterclass in acting.

The college's music scene regularly perform at University events across Durham, including Durham Cathedral. The college ensembles include both a chamber and pop choir, the latter of which were invited to perform at the UK Choir Festival 2024, as well as a Jazz Band and Chamber Orchestra. May 2024 saw students from the college putting on a sell-out performance of Captain Noah and His Floating Zoo at Durham's Gala Theatre Durham in May 2024, involving school students from across the county.

Every year the college hosts a Candlemas Ball. Founded in 1956, this is one of the older and more flamboyant balls in the university. It is recognised, along with University College's June Ball, as being one of Durham's versions of the University of Cambridge's May Balls. Due to restrictions on social activities related to the COVID-19 pandemic in 2021, Candlemas 64 was cancelled, with the decision made for the next event to be called Candlemas 65. On 30 January 2026 the college hosted Candlemas 69, themed around The Great Gatsby.

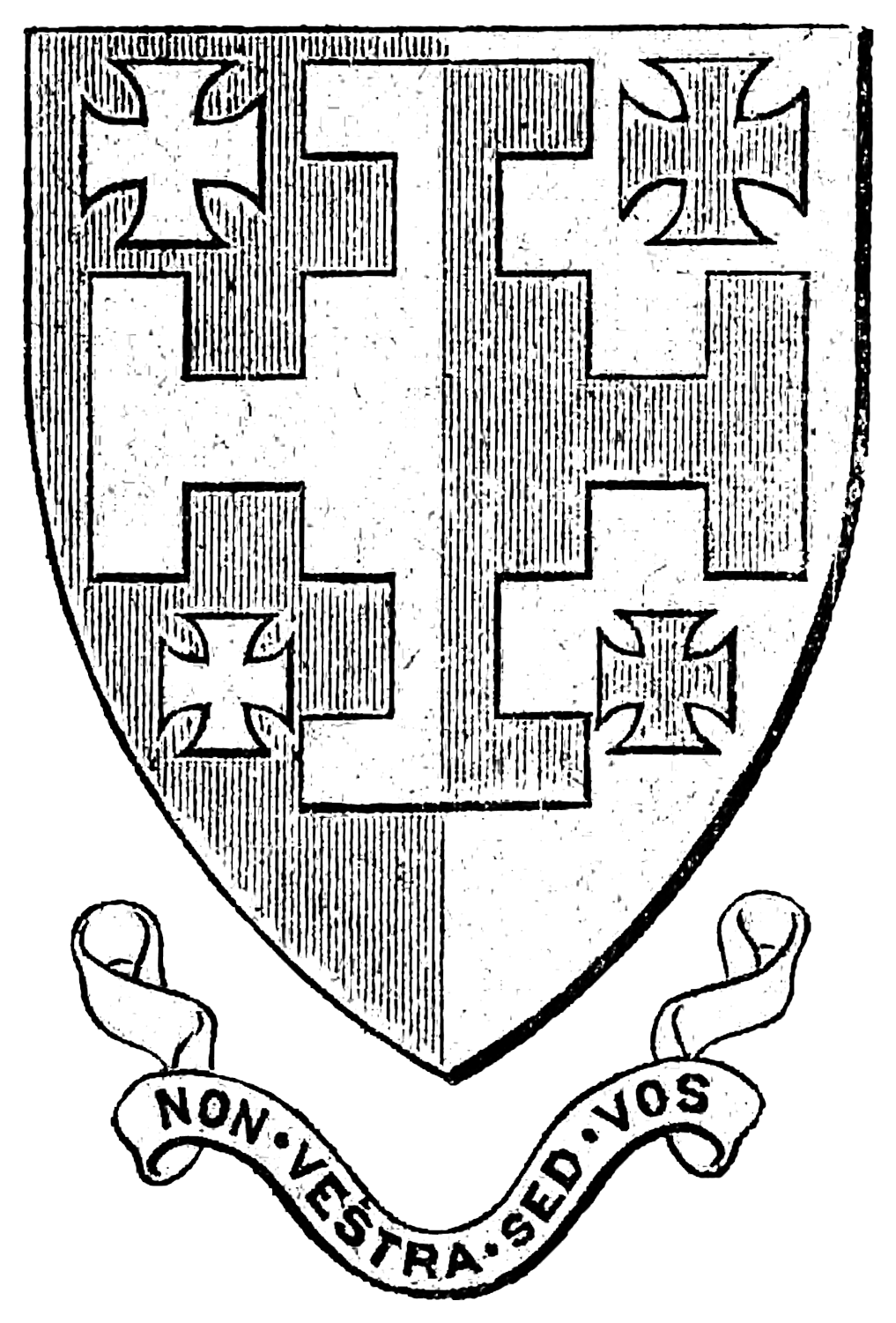
Early arms used by the hostel and hall (1905)

=== Arms and motto ===
The College was granted its arms in 1951 by the College of Arms. Its blazon are as follows:

Vert a Cross potent quadrate Or in chief a Durham Mitre of the last between two Lions rampant Argent.

The college's motto, non vestra sed vos (literally "not yours but you") reflects the college's beginnings, when it sought to enable students of modest means to gain access to a university education. The motto commits the college to being concerned with the person, rather than with what the person owns.

== Organisation and administration ==
=== Status ===
St Chad's is a "recognised college" of Durham University, but it is not maintained or governed by the university (St John's College has the same status). The college was originally licensed by the university as a hall of residence, becoming a college in 1919. The distinction between colleges and halls at that time was more a matter of style than substance, as nothing but the name changed. The college had argued for the change because it had gradually built up several endowed fellowships, which it thought were characteristic more of a college than of a hall (that said, other halls in Durham quickly followed suit without having such endowments). The term "recognised college" was first used in the 1937 statutes to refer to those colleges not maintained by the university.

=== Governance ===
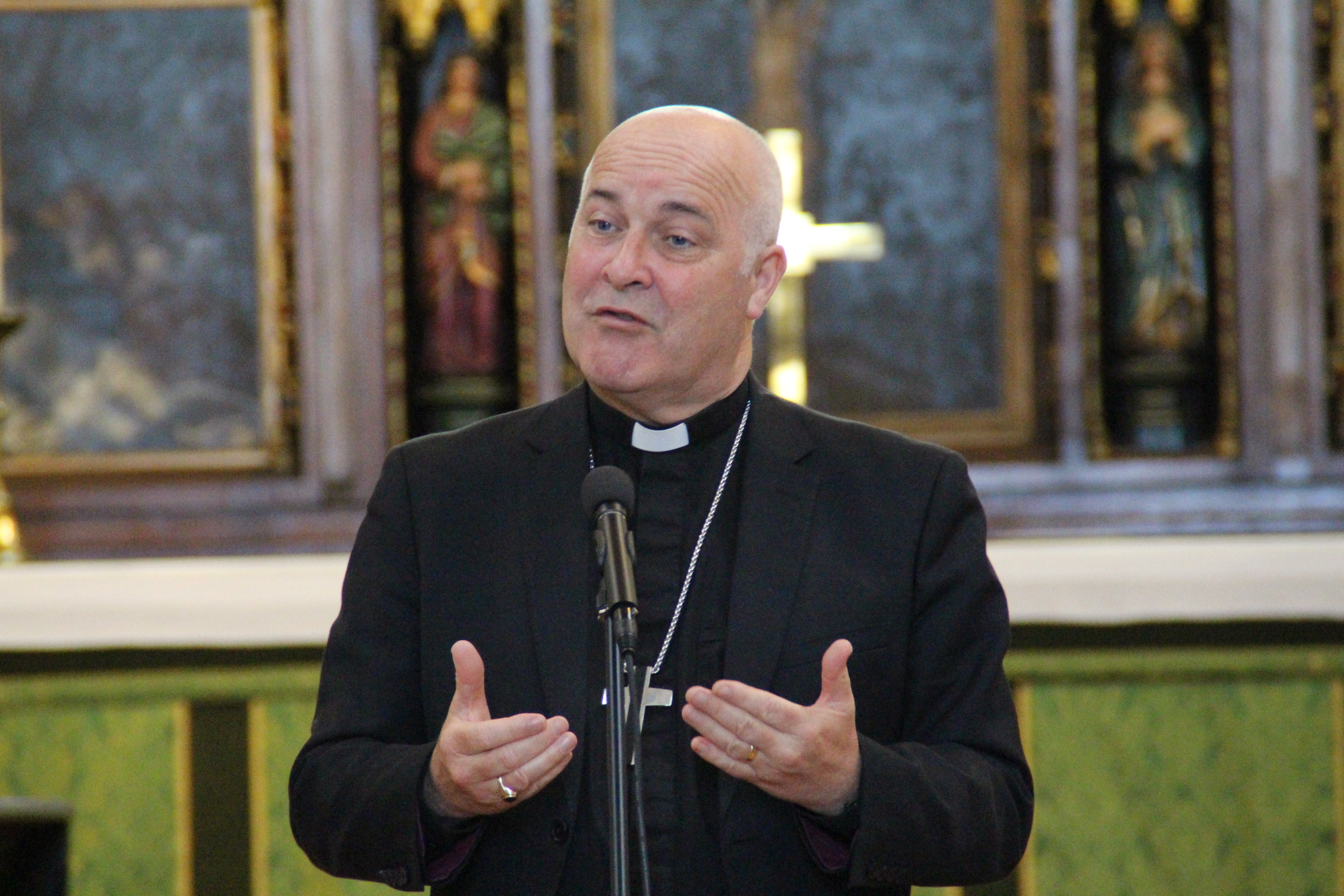
College visitor archbishop Stephen Cottrell

The college's visitor is the Archbishop of York, currently Stephen Cottrell. The visitor exercises customary visitorial functions and is the court of final appeal for any matters referred to the archbishop by the governors. The visitor is appointed by the governors for a renewable five-year period. In matters regarding the university itself (such as those brought forward by students), the university's visitor has jurisdiction.

The college's rector is Philip Plyming, Dean of Durham. The rector is the titular head of the college, who has responsibility for monitoring the college's furtherance of its Anglican foundation and tradition. Ceremonially, the rector presides at certain official functions in college: the role is in some ways akin to the chancellor's role in the university.

The college is formed by up to twenty governors who are its legal members, and who act as the trustees of the charity and directors of the limited company. The Chair of Governors is Father Mark Woodruff, an alumnus whose work mainly involves engagement with the civil voluntary sector, especially in the fields of social development and inclusion. He is also a Catholic priest of the Diocese of Westminster, serving also at the Ukrainian Greek Catholic of the Holy Family of London. The university and the dioceses of York, Durham, Newcastle and Carlisle all nominate governors, though they must be elected by the college. The Principal and the Presidents of the Senior, Middle and Junior Common Rooms serve as governors ex officio, and the undergraduates and the tutors may also each nominate a governor for election. Other governors are elected from outside the college.

=== Finance ===
The college has a modest endowment, which is enough to fund significant annual capital improvements, and a number of named scholarships. A private charity, as opposed to a public body, the college's funding comes largely from income raised from student residence fees, from its commercial and conference trade, from philanthropic gifts, and from an annual college fee paid by the University, calculated to match that spent on each maintained college to facilitate the colleges' wider student experience responsibilities. The college is a registered charity. Its annual turnover is £3.1 million.

=== Admissions ===
Competition for membership in the college is strong and the St Chad's is regularly one of the most over-subscribed colleges in Durham University in terms of applications per place. Applications for postgraduate places similarly outnumber availability. Admissions have been managed centrally by Durham University since 2014. Like other colleges, applicants are considered chiefly on the basis of academic merit, and 90% of undergraduates at St Chad's attain a first or upper second class degree.

In the recent past, the college was one of four Durham colleges designated by the university to accept open postgraduate applications in all disciplines, though now virtually all colleges accept such applicants. St Chad's has a number of dedicated postgraduate residences and an unusually high percentage (more than 30%) of postgraduate students.

=== Patronage ===
The governors of the college possess the advowson for ten benefices of the Church of England. Five are located in the Diocese of Liverpool (St Agnes', Toxteth; St Stephen's with St Catherine's; St Faith's, Great Crosby; St Paul's, Stoneycroft; and St Margaret's, Toxteth), two in the Diocese of St Edmundsbury and Ipswich (Hadley (St Mary), and Wratting (Great and Little) and one in each in the Durham (Longnewton), Hereford (Pontesbury) and Leicester (Syston) dioceses. Many of the advowsons were given to the college in the early twentieth century. In the past, the patron would have had complete power to appoint the new priest; that power is now exercised jointly with the local bishop and parish (and often with other patrons).

== Academic profile ==
=== Institutes ===
Though most Durham colleges are primarily residential rather than teaching institutions, St Chad's has its own research and academic staff. Responsibility for purely academic matters is overseen by the Principal in consultation with the Fellows, one of whom, Professor Tony Chapman, is head of research and Director of Policy&Practice, working in the fields of government policy and conducting primary research into regional development, regional economics and third sector activities. Other professorial and research fellows and academics associated with the college often work in conjunction with various university departments. Still others work chiefly outside the college and university.

=== Charitable activities ===
In addition to its primary charitable object of supporting students and scholars in Durham, the college supports the students in volunteering in charities and communities in the local region. To widen participation, the college has created partnerships with a number of secondary schools in the North East and beyond and has worked with primary schools in County Durham and Newcastle upon Tyne, and further afield.

=== Collegiate studies ===
All Durham colleges are interdisciplinary, enabling staff and students to broaden their study and research interests. St Chad's runs a collegiate studies programme, (currently named Outside the Box) which complements departmentally-based studies. The programme is explicitly justice-orientated, reflecting the ethos and history of the college. Students and staff are introduced to complex social issues; they are invited to participate in a weekly programme of training-events that go beyond traditional transferable skills to include such things as ethical decision-making and eco-friendly life-strategies.

== Notable people ==
St. Chad's College's Coat of Arms

=== College fellows ===
Senior college officers include the Principal, the Vice-Principal, the Finance & Operations Director, the Chaplain, and the Librarian. In addition, St Chad's has over 30 college fellows, research fellows and research associates. There are around 50 college tutors who act as mentors for both undergraduates and postgraduates. The College offers a number of visiting fellowships to academics of all disciplines. A further 100 university staff associate themselves with the college, chiefly through membership in the Senior Common Room. The college awards honorary fellowships to those who have made significant contributions to the College, the church or to public life.

=== List of principals ===
- 1904 Stephen R. P. Moulsdale (also Vice-Chancellor of Durham University, 1934–36)
- 1937 John S. Brewis (became Archdeacon of Doncaster)
- 1947 Theodore S. Wetherall
- 1965 John C. Fenton (became Canon and then Sub-Dean, Christ Church, Oxford)
- 1978 Ronald C. Trounson
- 1989 David Jasper (became Dean of Theology, Glasgow University)
- 1991 Eric Halladay
- 1994 Duane Arnold
- 1997 Joseph P. M. Cassidy
- 2016 Margaret Masson

=== Notable alumni ===
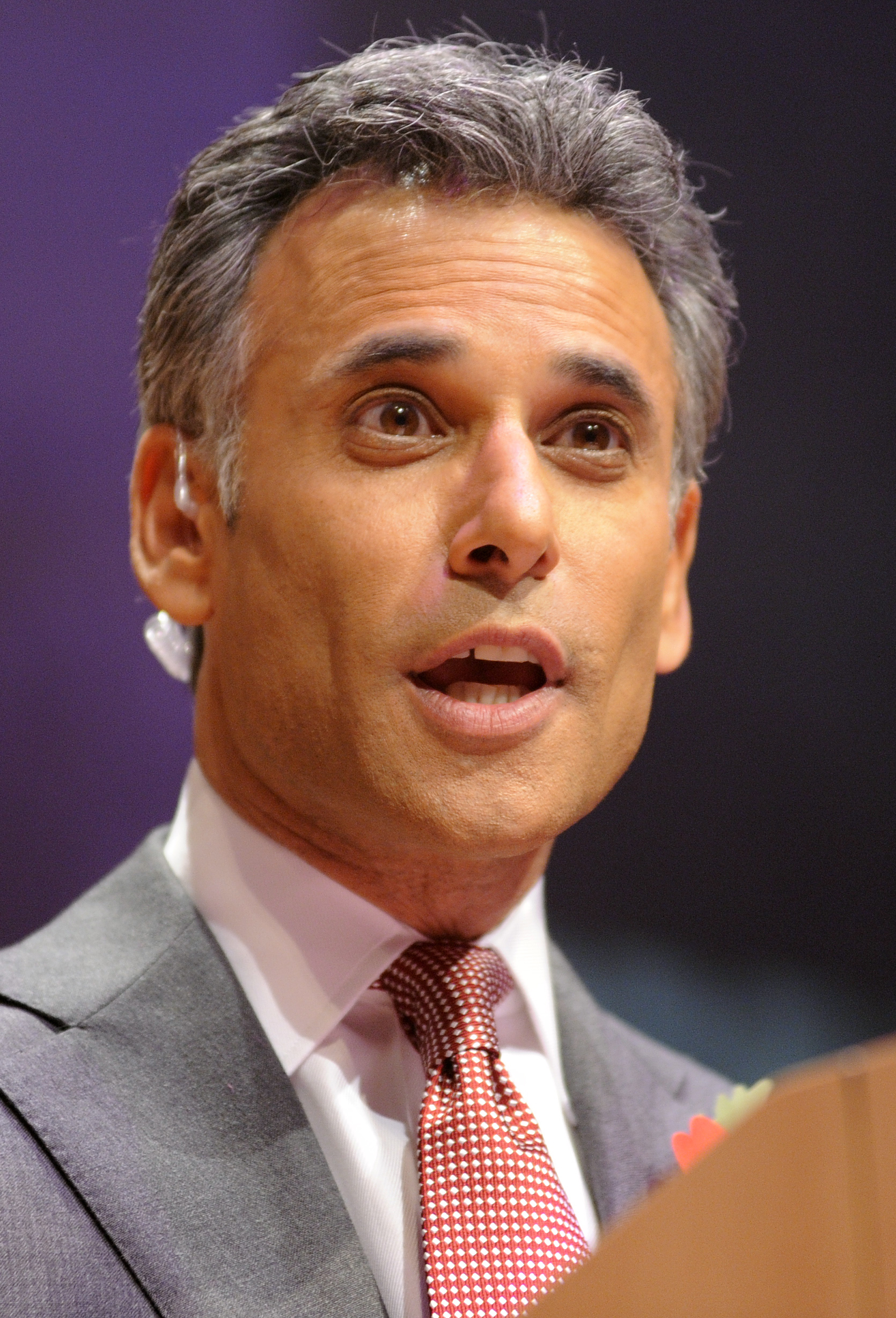
Matthew Amroliwala, BBC television newsreader

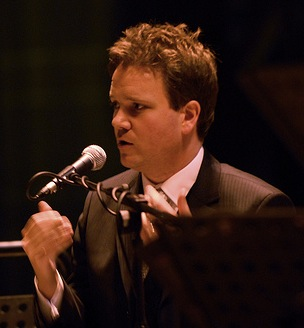
Keith Getty, hymnwriter and composer (In Christ Alone, The Power of the Cross)

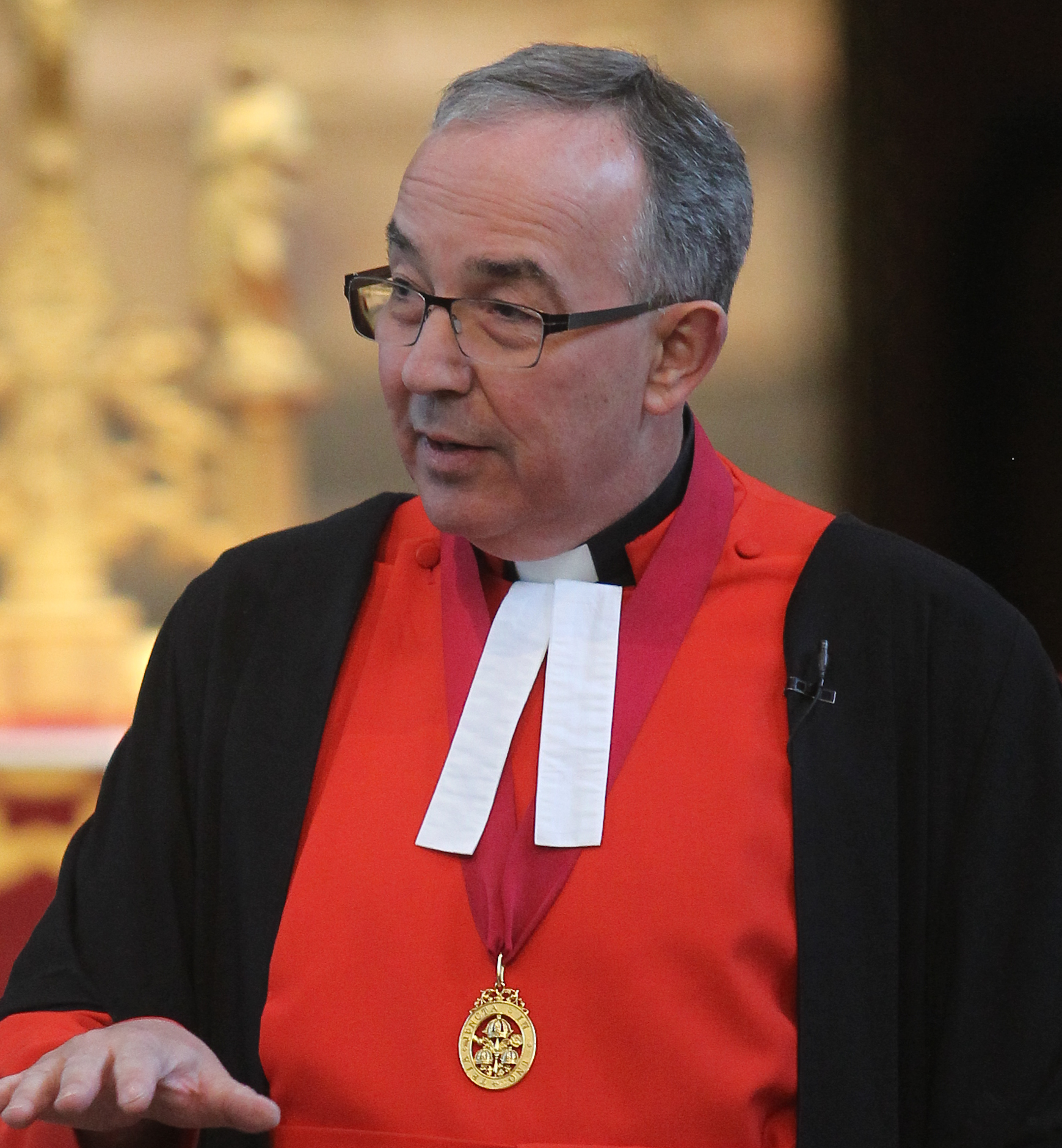
John Hall, former Dean of Westminster and chaplain to Queen Elizabeth II

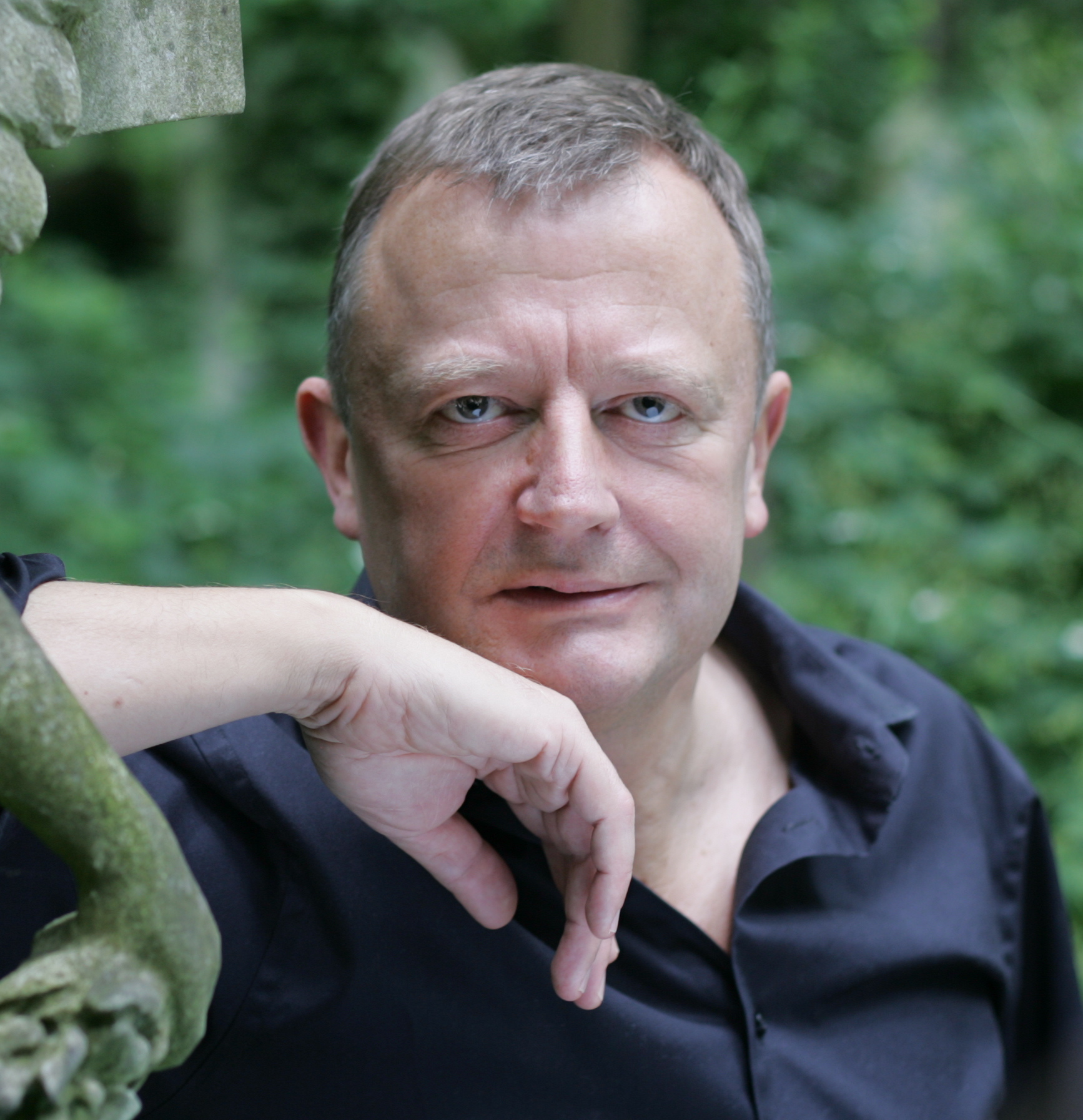
Patrick Hawes, composer, conductor, organist and pianist

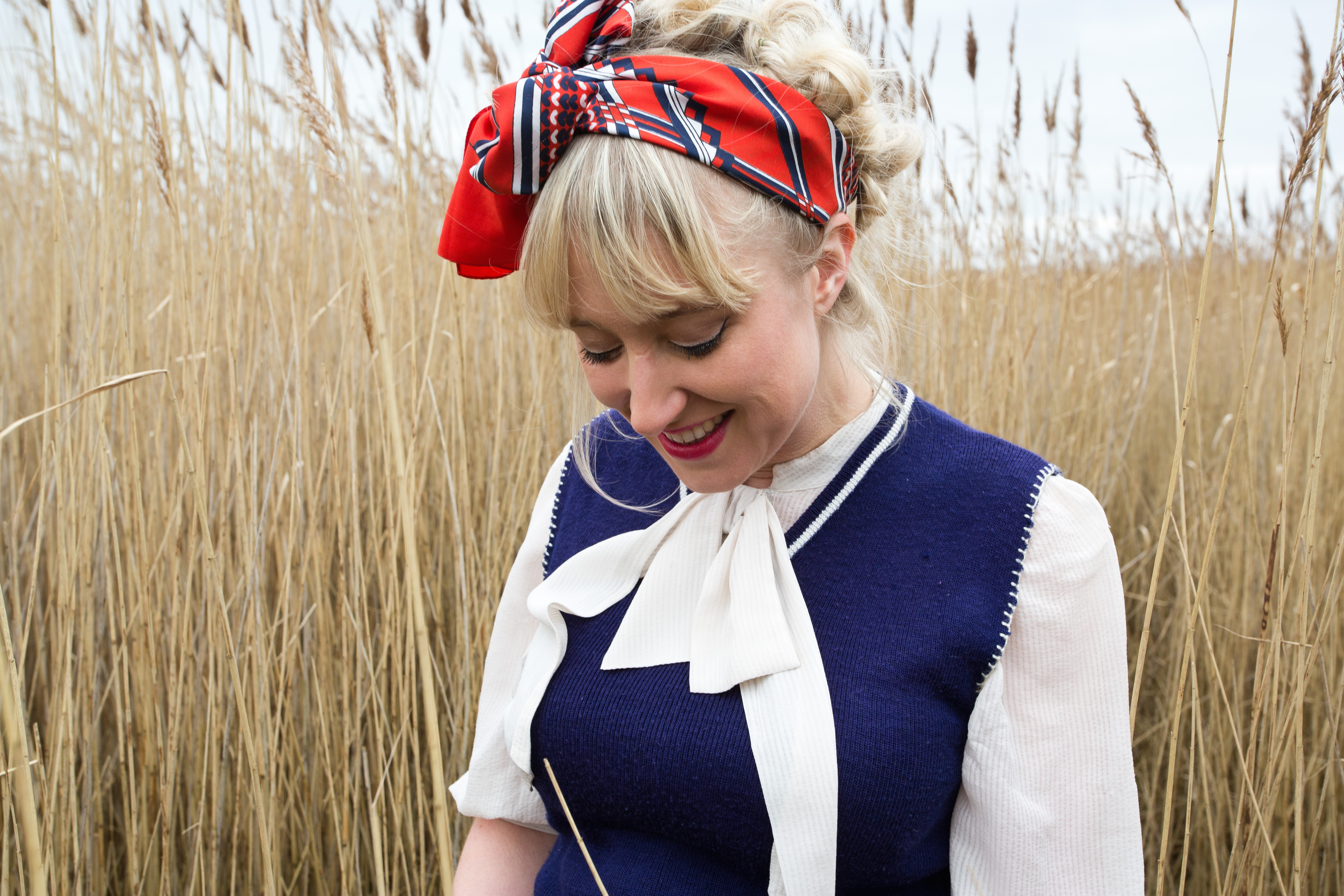
Gwyneth Herbert, singer-songwriter, composer, multi-instrumentalist and record producer

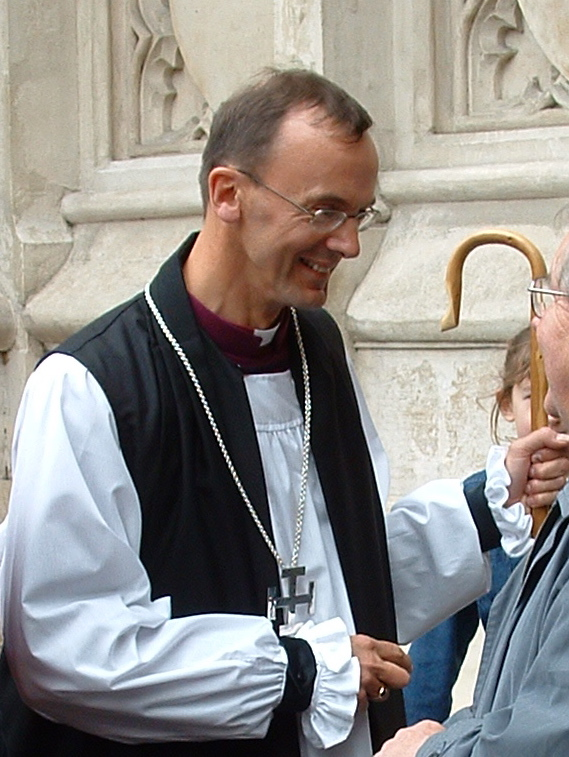
John Inge, Bishop of Worcester

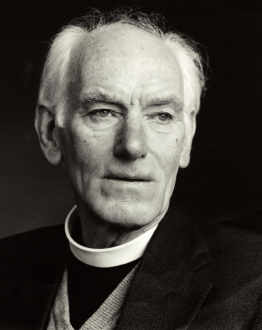
John McManners, clergyman, historian of religion, and Regius Professor of Ecclesiastical History at the University of Oxford

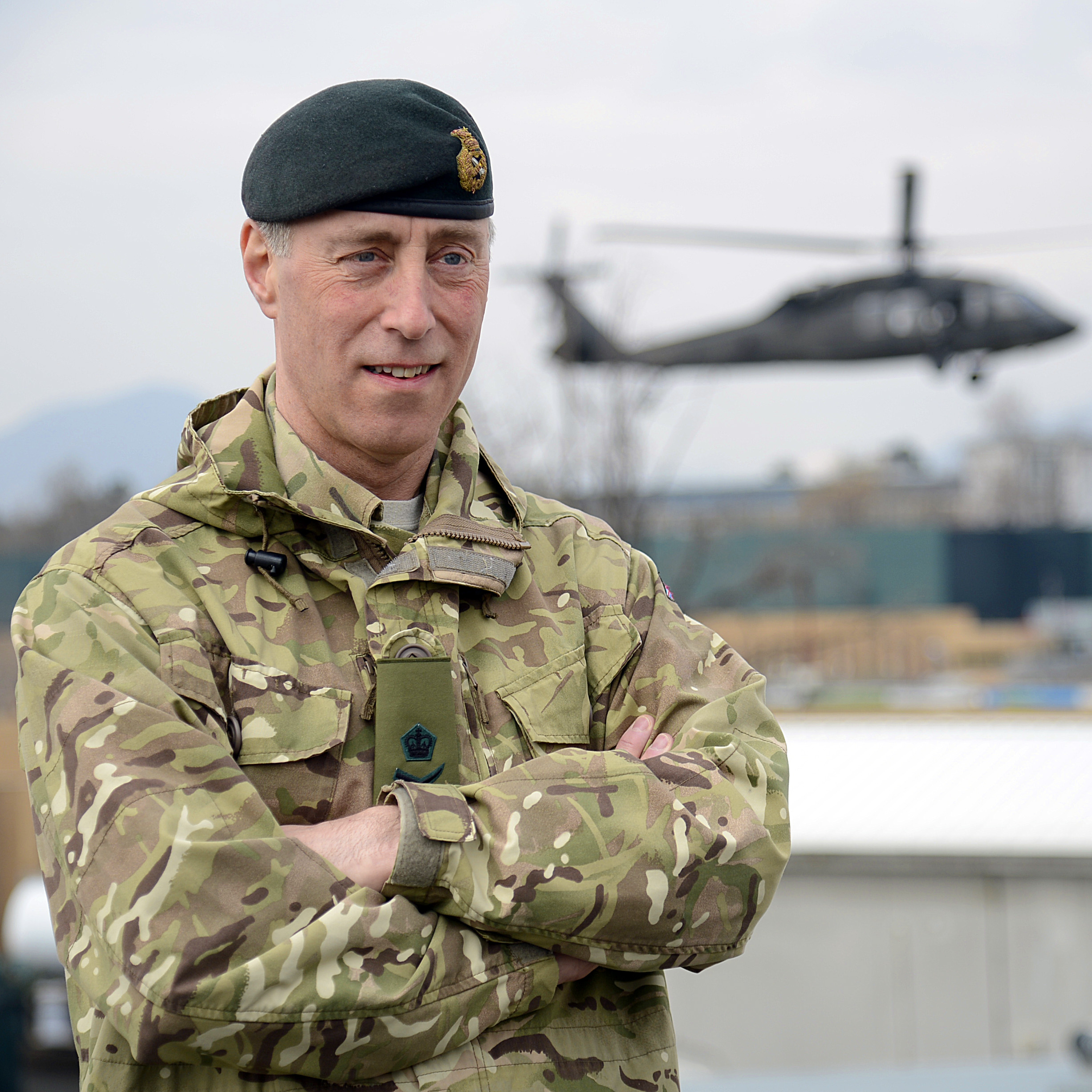
Tim Radford, retired British Army officer who served as Commander of the Allied Rapid Reaction Corps

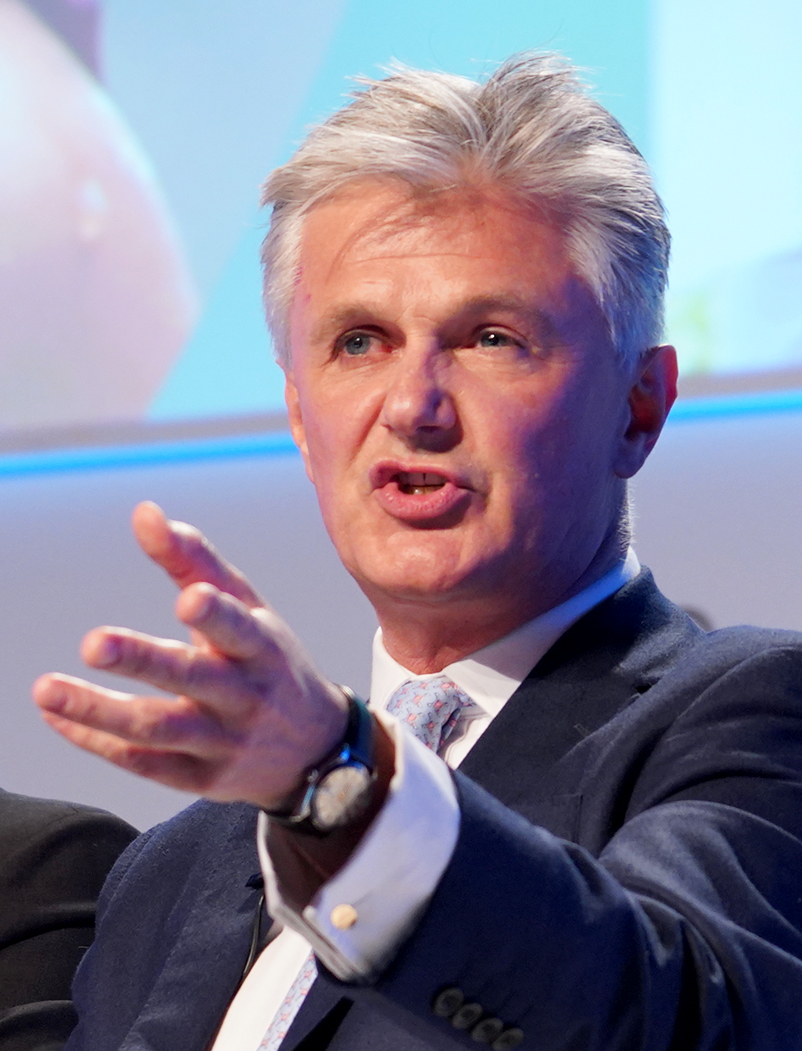
Tim Willcox, BBC News presenter

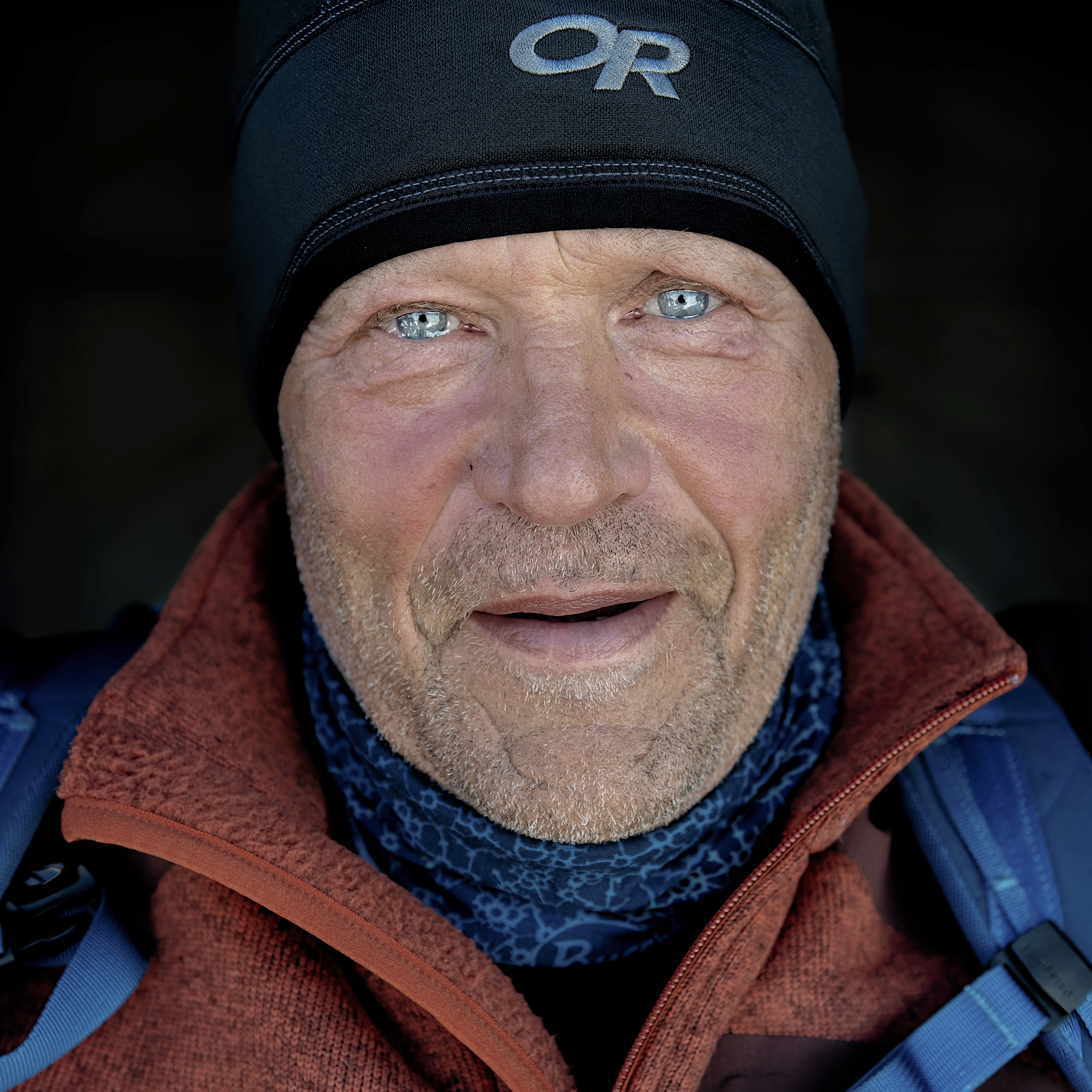
Robert Swan, first person to reach both the South and North Pole on foot

- Matthew Amroliwala, BBC television news presenter
- Clifford Barker – Dip.Theol. (1952) – Bishop of Whitby (1976–1983) and Bishop of Selby (1983–1991)
- Jonathan Batty, cricketer, Surrey and Gloucestershire wicketkeeper and opening batsman
- Stephen Bicknell, organ designer and lecturer at the Royal Academy of Music
- Arthur Bostrom, actor who played Officer Crabtree in 'Allo 'Allo!
- Sydney Caulton, Dean of Auckland, Bishop of Melanesia
- Nicholas Chamberlain – BA, PhD American Literature – Bishop of Grantham
- Alan Chesters – BA Mod. History – Bishop of Blackburn 1989–2003, made Hon. Fellow in 2010
- J. Michael Clarke, composer and musician
- Charles Mark Townshend Colville, 5th Viscount Colville of Culross, BBC Producer and director, elected hereditary peer 2011
- Anthony Crichton-Stuart, art historian
- Adrian Dannatt, child actor, artist and journalist
- Carla Denyer - Mechanical Engineering (2009) - co-leader of the Green Party of England and Wales
- Steve Easterbrook – Natural Sciences – former CEO of PizzaExpress, Wagamama and McDonald's
- Harry Entwistle – Ordinary of the Personal Ordinariate of Our Lady of the Southern Cross
- Brian Evans, cricketer, Hertfordshire batsman
- Gary Ferguson – BA Hons. (1st 1985), PhD(1989) – Douglas Huntly Gordon Distinguished Professor of French at the University of Virginia
- Tim FitzHigham – award-winning British comedian, author, and world record holder
- Keith Getty – BA Music (1996) – composer and hymnwriter
- Richard Gillings – BA, Dip. Biblical Studies – Archdeacon of Macclesfield (1994–2004)
- Drexel Gomez – 1959 – Primate of the West Indies
- John Robert Hall – BA Hons Theol. – Dean, Westminster Abbey from 2006, Dean of the Order of the Bath, since 2006, made a Hon. Fellow in 2009.
- Patrick Hawes BA (Music), MA (1981), composer, conductor, organist and pianist
- Michael Henshall – BA (1954), DipTh (1956) – Bishop Suffragan of Warrington(1976–96)
- Gwyneth Herbert, singer and composer
- James Holland - BA (1992) - historian, writer, and broadcaster.
- Alan Horsley – BA (1958) – Provost of St Andrew's Cathedral, Inverness (1988 to 1991)
- John Inge – BSc (1977), MA (1994) PhD – Honorary Fellow, Bishop of Worcester
- Michael Ipgrave – PhD (1999) – Bishop of Lichfield
- David Jasper, Professor in Literature and Theology, University of Glasgow
- Owen Johnson – English Literature (1988) – dendrologist
- Sir Jonathan Jones – Law (1984) – Chief Executive of the Government Legal Department
- John McManners, Regius Professor of Ecclesiastical History at Oxford and winner of the Wolfson History Prize
- Allan Mallinson, novelist and military historian
- Cecil Richard Norgate, former Bishop of Masasi, Tanzania
- Tim O'Gorman – BA Law – cricketer, former Derbyshire opening batsman
- Richard Ovenden – BA Economic/Modern History (1985) – Bodley's Librarian, Bodleian Library, University of Oxford
- Hugh Pearman – BA Eng. Lang. and Lit.- architecture and design critic, The Sunday Times, since 1986
- General Tim Radford – BA Politics, 1984 - Deputy Supreme Allied Commander Europe, NATO
- Anthony Russell, Honorary Fellow, retired Bishop of Ely
- John Seaford – BA (1967), DipTh (1968) – Dean of Jersey and Rector of St Helier (1993–2005)
- Martin Speight, former Durham County Cricket Club wicketkeeper
- Michael Spurr – BA Economics + History – Director of Operations, HM Prison Service
- David Strang CBE – Engineering (1980) – Chief Constable, Lothian and Borders Police (2007–13) and Her Majesty's Chief Inspector of Prisons for Scotland (2013-18)
- Robert Swan – BA Ancient History (1976–1979) – Honorary Fellow, Explorer – the first person to reach both the South and North Pole on foot
- Martin Warner, M.A., PhD, Bishop of Chichester
- Tim Willcox – BA Spanish – BBC television news presenter

=== Other notable associated people ===
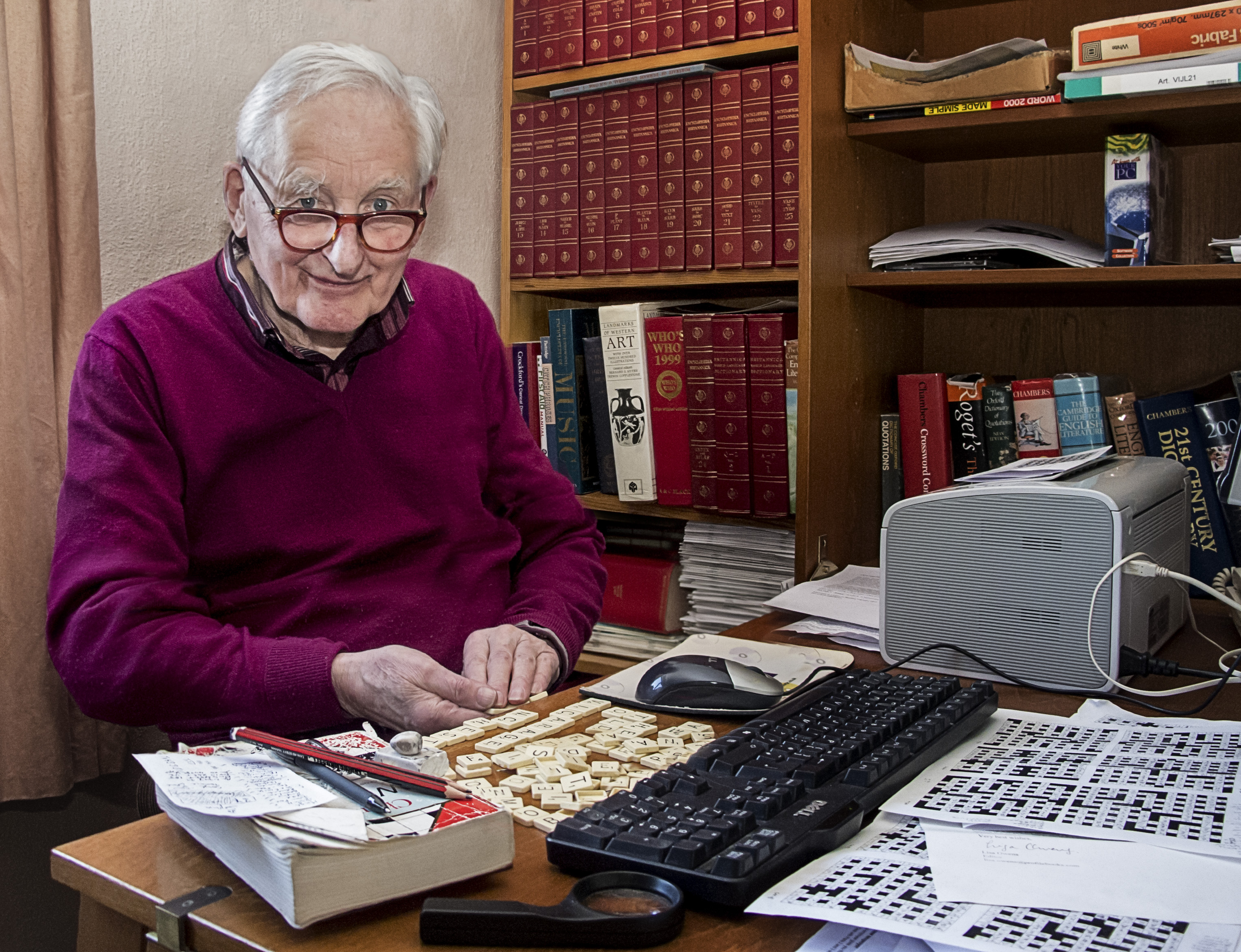
John Galbraith Graham, best known as crossword compiler Araucaria, chaplain and tutor 1949–1952.

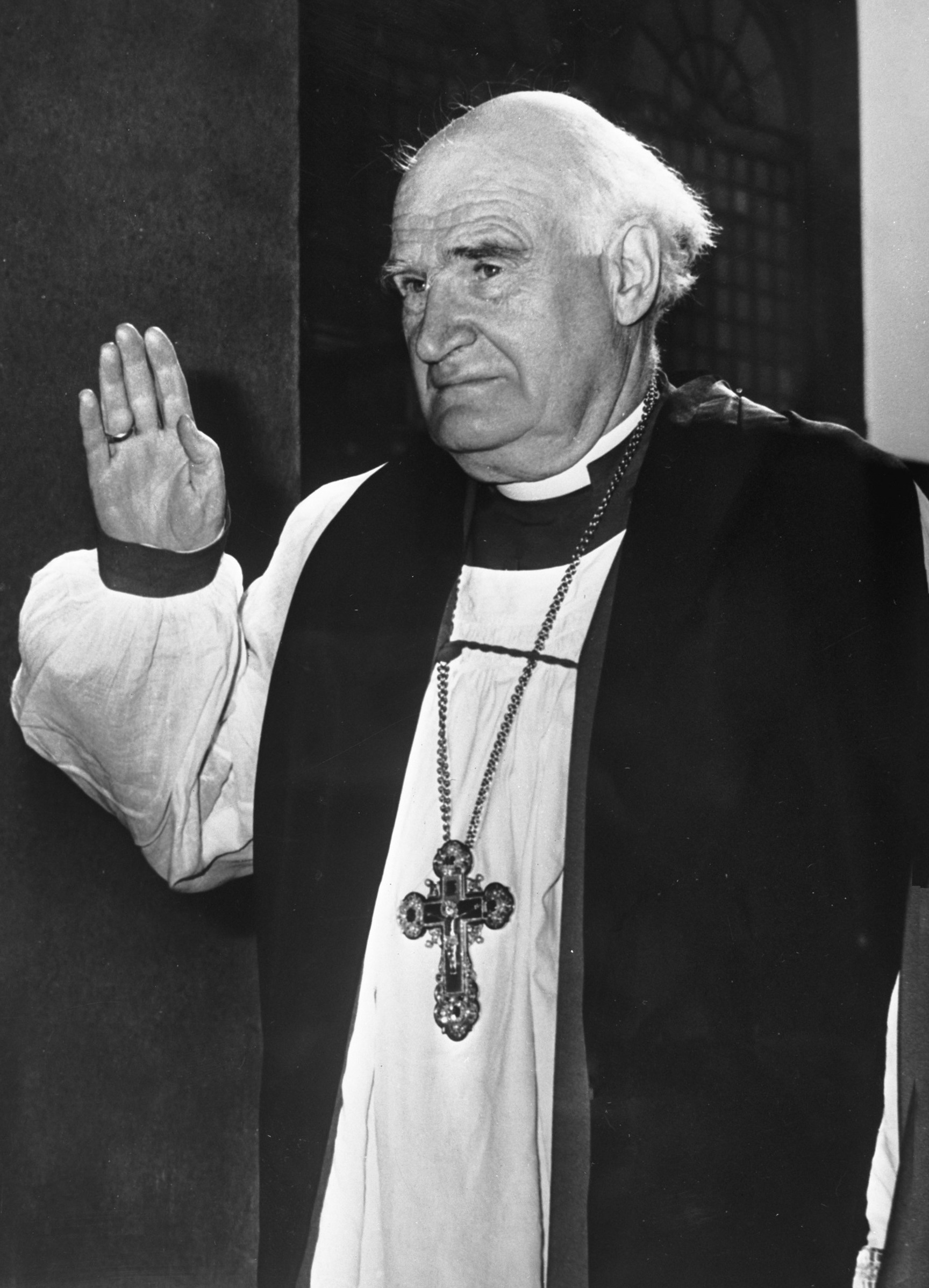
Michael Ramsey, the 100th Archbishop of Canterbury, resident fellow and governor

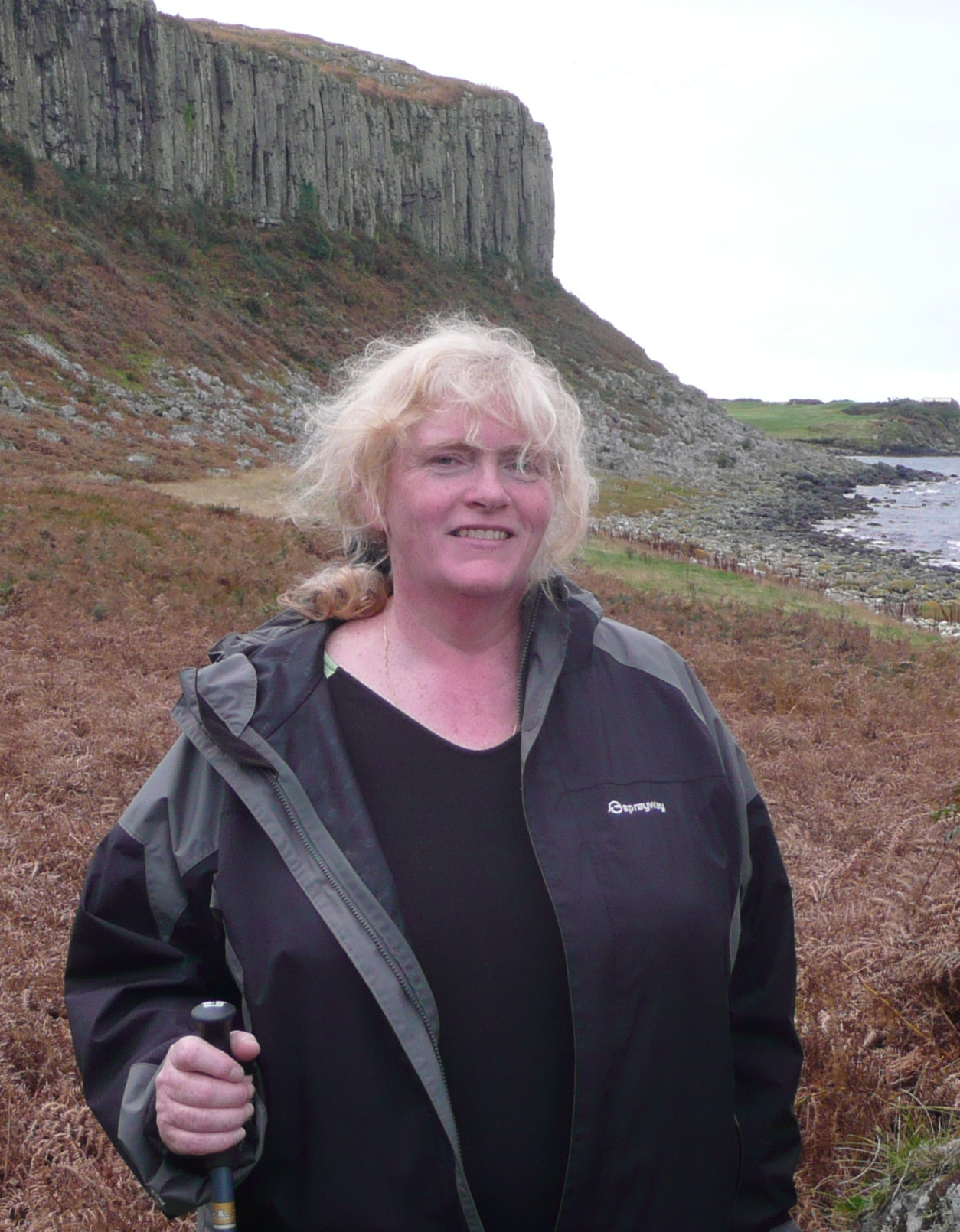
Baroness Sherlock of Durham OBE, honorary fellow
- John Galbraith Graham, noted British crossword puzzle compiler – 'Araucaria' of The Guardian
- Giles Ramsay – theatre director, producer and playwright, Fellow
- Michael Ramsey (Baron Ramsey of Canterbury) – former College Tutor, Fellow, Governor and Visitor, Archbishop of Canterbury (1961–1974)
- Maeve Sherlock (Baroness Sherlock of Durham), awarded life peerage in May 2010, Honorary Fellow, former Chief executive of the Refugee Council and policy advisor to Gordon Brown
- David Stancliffe, Fellow, retired Bishop of Salisbury

In 2022, singer Sophie Ellis-Bextor was voted as an honorary membership of the JCR in recognition of her contribution to music, which often features at St Chad's events. Other honorary memberships awarded in the academic year include the former JCR President, the former Bar President, and students of a twinned College in Ukraine.

== See also ==
- Chad of Mercia
