= Joseph Cassidy (priest) =

Canadian-born priest, theologian and academic

The Reverend Canon Joseph Cassidy FRSA

Principal of St Chad's College, Durham
- In office 1997–2015
- Preceded by: Duane Arnold
- Succeeded by: Margaret Masson

Personal details
- Born: Joseph Patrick Michael Cassidy; 11 August 1954 Westmount, Quebec, Canada
- Died: 28 March 2015 (aged 60)
- Education: Concordia University; University of Detroit Mercy; Regis College, Toronto; Toronto University; Saint Paul University; Ottawa University
- Non-Residentiary Canon of Durham Cathedral
- Church: Church of England (formerly Roman Catholic Church)
- Diocese: Diocese of Durham
- In office: 2001–2015
- Other post: Society of Jesus (?–1991)

Orders
- Ordination: 1985 (deacon); 1986 (priest)

Joseph Patrick Michael Cassidy FRSA (11 August 1954 – 28 March 2015) was a Canadian-born priest in the Church of England, theologian and academic. He was formerly a Roman Catholic priest and Jesuit. He was Principal of St Chad's College at Durham University, England and a member of the university's theology department. He was also a non-residentiary canon of Durham Cathedral.

== Early life ==
Cassidy was born on 11 August 1954 in Westmount, Quebec, Canada. He grew up on the West Island of Montreal, where he was educated at St. Thomas High School (Pointe-Claire). He won the 'Match of the Minds' competition to gain a full scholarship at Loyola College (Montreal) (later to become Concordia University), from which he graduated with a first class honours degree in theological studies in 1975. After postgraduate studies at University of St. Michael's College, University of Toronto, he entered the Jesuits at the St. Stanislaus Novitiate in Guelph, Ontario. He subsequently studied philosophy at the University of Detroit, where he was awarded an MA degree in philosophy, with a perfect 4.0 GPA (1980).

After his philosophy studies, Cassidy spent a brief formative time in Kingston, Jamaica, as a pastoral assistant. He was later assigned to teach at Gonzaga Regional High School in St. John's, Newfoundland, where he taught physics and English for two years. He returned to Toronto for theology studies, this time to Regis College in the University of Toronto where he was awarded a Bachelor of Sacred Theology degree (summa cum laude) and a Master of Divinity (first class honours) degree from the Toronto School of Theology. During his theological studies, he spent the better part of a year in post-revolutionary Nicaragua working as a researcher at the Instituto Nicaragüense de Investigaciones Económicas y Sociales (INIES). Throughout his time at Regis College he was an associate of the Jesuit Centre for Social Faith and Justice in Toronto.

== Religious life and academic career ==
Cassidy was ordained in the Roman Catholic Church as a deacon in 1985 and as a priest in 1986. After ordination to the priesthood, he became a member of the retreat team at Loyola House, Guelph, Canada, where, among other things, he directed thirty-day retreats. He transferred to Montreal to care for an ailing parent, becoming co-director of the Ignatian Centre, Montreal, and a visiting professor at Concordia University where he taught courses in the history of spirituality and social ethics. During these years, he began a doctorate in Ottawa and directed dozens of workshops and retreats across Canada and the United States.

After leaving the Jesuits in 1991, Cassidy earned a Licentiate of Sacred Theology (STL) degree (summa cum laude) from Saint Paul University and taught ethics part-time for the university. He moved to Toronto to become Director of Research at a small non-government organisation, the Latin American Working Group (LAWG), where he edited Central America Update, a monthly journal/newsletter providing news and analysis on Central America. Cassidy obtained a conjoint PhD degree in Social Ethics from the University of Ottawa and Saint Paul University, where his thesis on the Ethics of Bernard Lonergan was awarded the University of Ottawa Graduate School's Gold Medal (Prix de l’École). He was also awarded a DTh degree by St Paul University.

Cassidy held academic positions in Montreal, Ottawa, Toronto, Southampton, and Durham. He became an Anglican in 1993, was licensed as an Anglican priest in 1996, and was a member of the theology department and Principal of St Chad's College from 1997.

Cassidy was a university proctor at the Church of England’s General Synod from 1999 to 2005 and was a non-residentiary canon of Durham Cathedral from 2001.

A theological liberal on social issues, he wrote in his later years on spirituality, philosophical ethics, sexuality, Anglicanism, and economics. He was a member of the Council of Durham Cathedral and chaired and served on a number of panels and committees of the Church of England's Ministry Division. He was a Trustee of a number of charities, including the Royal School of Church Music (the RSCM) and the Society for Promoting Christian Knowledge (SPCK). He was a Fellow of the Royal Anthropological Institute of Great Britain and Ireland, the Royal Society of Arts and a Founding Fellow of the Institute of Continuing Professional Development.

== Death ==
On 28 March 2015, Cassidy died at the age of 60 after suffering a heart attack. His funeral was held at Durham Cathedral on 17 April 2015.

Academic offices
Preceded by Duane Arnold	Principal of St Chad's College; 1997-2015	Succeeded by Margaret Masson
