= David Jasper =

British theologian

David Jasper JD

== Biography ==
Jasper received multiple degrees from Oxford in both English and Theology. He graduated in English from Jesus College (BA, 1972; MA, 1976) and in Theology from St Stephen's House (BTh, 1975; MA, 1979). He was ordained deacon in 1976 and priest in 1977. He later completed his doctorate at Durham University (Hatfield College), where he also served as Chaplain until 1988.

He was a founder of the Conference on Literature and Religion at Durham University in 1980. Since then, a series of international meetings have been organised every other year by the organisation, providing a forum for the inter-disciplinary study of literature and theology in contemporary Europe. Jasper was Principal of St Chad's College from 1989 to 1991, leaving to become Dean of Theology at Glasgow. His recent research has been into some of the earliest of Christian theologians, hermits and Desert theology. On 26 January 2007 Jasper received an honorary doctorate by the Faculty of Theology at Uppsala University, Sweden.

In 2014 Jasper became priest in charge of St Cuthbert's Church in Cambuslang, combining this job with his academic work.

Academic offices
| Preceded by Ronald C. Trounson | Principal of St Chad's College, Durham; 1989 to 1991 | Succeeded by Eric Halladay |

== Publications ==
- Coleridge as Poet and Religious Thinker, (1985)
- The New Testament and the Literary Imagination, (1987)
- The Study of Literature and Religion: An Introduction, Second Edition, (1992)
- Rhetoric, Power and Community: An Exercise in Reserve, (1993)
- Readings in the Canon of Scripture, (1995)
- The Sacred and Secular Canon in Romanticism, (1999)
- The Bible and Literature: A Reader (with Stephen Prickett), (1999)
- Religion and Literature: A Reader (with Robert Detweiler), (2000)
- The Sacred Desert, (2004)
- A Short Introduction to Hermeneutics, (2004)
- The Oxford Handbook of English Literature and Theology (co-editor with Andrew W. Hass and Elisabeth Jay), (2007)
- The Sacred Body, (2009)
- The Sacred Community, (2012)
- The Language of Liturgy, (2018)
- Heaven in Ordinary: Religion and Poetry in a Secular Age, (2018)
