= Grey College, Durham =

Constituent college of Durham University

Grey College
- Durham University
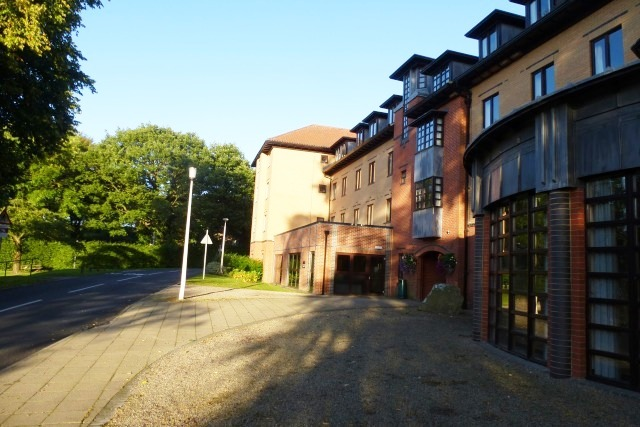
- Holgate House and the Victor Watts Library, Grey College

- Arms of Grey College; Arms: Gules, a scaling ladder in bend argent between two St. Cuthbert crosses proper.
- Coordinates: 54.764908°N 1.575511°W
- Motto: Latin: Gradibus ascendimus
- Motto in English: Ascending by degrees
- Established: 1959
- Named for: Charles Grey, 2nd Earl Grey
- Principal: Prof Sonia Virdee
- Undergraduates: 1,200
- Postgraduates: 150
- Mascot: Felix the Phoenix
- Website: Grey College
- JCR: JCR Website
- Boat club: Grey College Boat Club

Map
- Location within Durham, England

Grey College is a college of Durham University in England, founded in 1959 as part of the university's expansion of its student population. The college is named after Charles Grey, 2nd Earl Grey, who was Prime Minister of the United Kingdom at the time of the university's foundation; an alternative name considered was Cromwell College, but this proved controversial and lost by a single vote in the final selection.

The student population of Grey College consists of around 1,351 students, made up of just over 1,200 undergraduate students and a further 150 postgraduate students. The college is fully catered.

== History ==
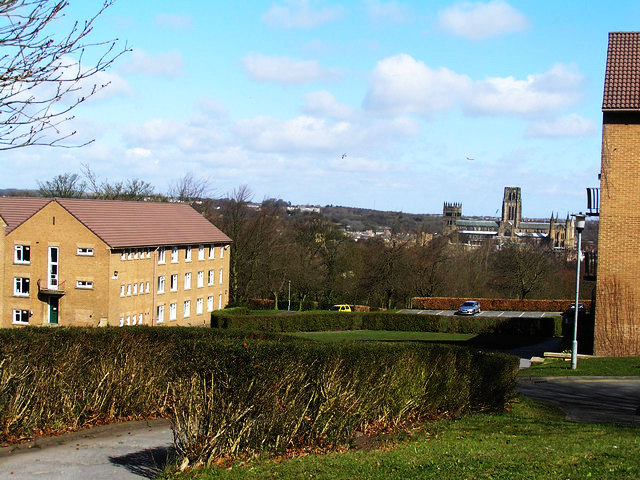
View of Durham Cathedral from Grey College

Founded in 1959, Grey was the first college of the university's post-war expansion, and the second college to open on Elvet Hill after St Mary's. It was also the last college founded before the separation of Durham and Newcastle in 1963. The college initially only admitted men, but has been mixed since 1984.

In March 1959, just a few months before the opening of the college, the Elvet block (then the main block of the college) was devastated by fire. However, the college recovered to open as scheduled in October and adopted the phoenix as its unofficial badge. The college coat of arms features a scaling ladder (or gré — the badge of the Grey family) between two St Cuthbert's crosses (the symbol of Durham). A new grant of arms in 2004 confirmed these and added the phoenix as a crest.

Fountains Hall was completed in 1971 and the Lattin Chapel, named after former college bursar Frank Lattin, was consecrated on 18 November 1973 by the Bishop of Durham, John Habgood.

During the 1966 World Cup, Grey College was home to the Soviet Union's football team who were playing their group matches in Sunderland and Middlesbrough. They won all their matches while based in Durham, but eventually lost to West Germany in the semi-finals.

Grey College was exclusively for male students until the start of the 1984–1985 academic year, when a contingent of nineteen women joined the college in their first year as a pilot programme. These first female members of the college had been assigned to Grey, rather than having chosen it, since they had not specified a college of residence at the time they had applied to the University of Durham. Few changes were made to accommodate the new mixed-sex living arrangements – toilet and bathroom facilities were shared, for instance. Female students could, however, request lace curtains in addition to the regular fabric curtains for their rooms.

In the following year, 1985–1986, Grey College opened its doors to all women, who could now actively apply to join the college. By the time these women had graduated three years later, Grey had become indistinguishable in population from the other mixed-sex colleges of the university.

In 1992 a plan to construct a fourth accommodation block was announced. This became Holgate House, named after the college's first Master, Sidney Holgate, and was opened in 1996. The Victor Watts Memorial Library, named after the college's third master, opened as an extension to Holgate House in 2005.

== Buildings ==
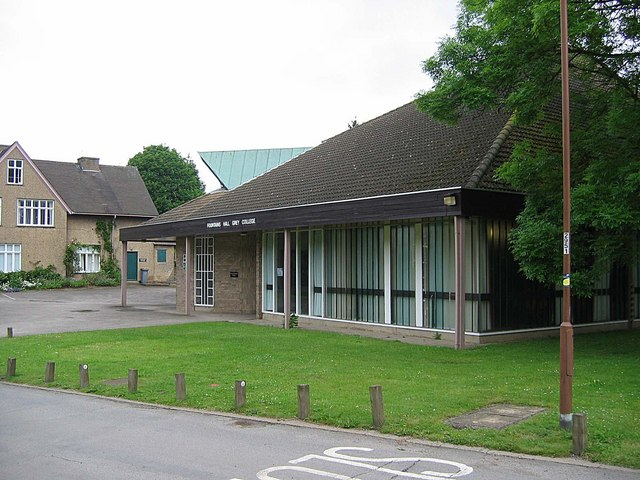
Fountains Hall, Grey College

There are four accommodation blocks on site: Hollingside (the main building), Elvet, Oswald, and Holgate House. The college offers a number of other facilities: Hollingside contains the 280-seat dining room, the college bar, and the Junior Common Room (JCR). Holgate House has a conference centre and a library with over 7,000 books. A fifth building, Fountains Hall, is the home of Phoenix Theatre Company (PTC), the college chapel, a multi-purpose hall (for everything from badminton to band practice), and a toastie bar.

The Durham University Botanic Garden and the High Wood are located next door to the college, and a path leads directly to the Mountjoy Site (formerly known as the Science Site).

The original buildings from 1957–63 were included in the local list as non-designated heritage assets in November 2023. The part of the college site on the north side of Hollingside Lane is included in Durham County Council's proposed Hill Colleges Conservation Area.

== College life ==
Notable social events include "The Informal or Winter Ball"; the "President's Guest Night" and "Grey Day", a music festival following the end of the examination period. The year comes to an end with "The Phoenix Ball", the largest and most lavish social event of the year.

Grey has a large number of sports clubs, ranging from Grey College Boat Club through Grey College Ultimate Frisbee Club to team croquet. Many of Grey's sporting clubs have enjoyed success in recent years, notably the women's hockey team, boat club, darts team, rugby team, football team, cheerleading squad and Ultimate Frisbee Club.

Members of the college sometimes refer to themselves as the "Grey Army" and can be found at many college sporting events (usually rugby games) supporting the team, with a "Commander-in-Chief" appointed by the JCR each academic year to lead the troops. Another mascot of the college is the "College Trout"—a Big Mouth Billy Hamill toy that is currently stationed behind the bar. A bi-annual magazine, Grey Matter, also exists to satirise college events.

The college has a fellowship in mathematics (the Alan David Richards Fellowship) and a general fellowship scheme (the Sidney Holgate Fellowships), which includes funding for research fellows and an artist in residence.

== Notable students ==
- Heidi Alexander – BA Geog., MA – Labour MP for Lewisham East and Cabinet minister
- Adam Applegarth – BA Maths and Economics – Chief executive, Northern Rock (2001–07)
- Daniel Casey – BA English Literature – Co-star of Midsomer Murders, Casualty
- Peter Dixon – England Rugby Union Captain 1971
- Alan Greaves – archaeologist, University of Liverpool
- Chris Higgins – academic, Vice Chancellor of Durham University 2007 – 2014
- James Kirkup – BA – travel writer, poet, novelist, playwright, translator, broadcaster, Hon. Fellow Grey College from 1992
- Nish Kumar – BA History – Comedian
- Dominic Montserrat – BA Egyptology – TV egyptologist
- Guy Pepper – BSc Sport and Exercise – Rugby Union player and England international (2025–)
- John A. Pyle – BSc Physics – Atmospheric Scientist. Head of Chemistry Department at The University of Cambridge
- Tim Stimpson – BA Anthropology (1995) – Rugby Union player and England international (1996–2002)
- Major General John Sutherell – British Army Officer who served in the SAS.
- Rob Wickham – BA Geography – Anglican Bishop of Edmonton from 2015 and sometime part-time as Acting Bishop of Portsmouth.
- James Wilby – BSc Maths. – film, television and theatre actor
- David Williams – 1960–62 – Mathematician, formerly Professor of Mathematical Statistics, University of Cambridge
- Paul Gavin Williams – BA Hons Theol. (1989) – Bishop of Kensington, from 2015 Bishop of Southwell.

Fellows

- Lionel Blue – Rabbi, broadcaster, author and Honorary Doctor of Divinity & Fellow at Grey College
- Sir Reresby Sitwell, 7th Baronet – Hon. Fellow from 2001

== Masters and principals ==
The head of college was titled 'master' until 2023, when the title of 'principal' was adopted by Sonia Virdee, the first woman to be the head of the college.

- Sidney Holgate (1959 to 1980)
- Eric Halladay (1980 to 1988)
- Victor Watts (1988 to 2002)
- J. Martyn Chamberlain (2002 to 2011)
- Thomas Allen (2011 to 2021)
- Peter Swift (Acting Master 2021–2023)
- Sonia Virdee (2023 to present)
