= Alan Greaves =

Alan Greaves PFHEA (born 1969, Otley, West Yorkshire) is a lecturer at the University of Liverpool, UK, who specialises in the Bronze and Iron Ages of Anatolia.

== Career ==
In 2005 he was made a National Teaching Fellow by the UK Higher Education Academy.

In 2017 he was made a Principal Fellow of the Higher Education Academy in recognition of his advocacy of LGBT inclusion in British universities.

== Representative Publications ==
- Alan M Greaves. (2002). Miletos: A History, London: Routledge. ISBN 0-415-23846-3
- A. Fletcher and A. Greaves (eds.) (2007). Transanatolia, (Anatolian Studies 57). BIAA.
- Alan M Greaves. (2010). The Land of Ionia: Society and Economy in the Archaic Period, Wiley-Blackwell. ISBN 978-1-4051-9900-1
- Alan M Greaves (2015). John Garstang's Footsteps across Anatolia, Koc University Press. ISBN 9759780275 ISBN 978-9759780272

== Tours ==
He leads archaeological tours for Peter Sommer Travels.
