= The Bulwell Academy =

Location
- Squires Avenue; Bulwell, Nottingham, Nottinghamshire, NG6 8HG; England; 53.0062°N 1.1944°W

Information
- Type: Academy
- Motto: Everyone Achieves
- Established: September 2009
- Founder: Nottingham City Council; Thomas Telford School
- Trust: Edge/Thomas Telford (2012–18); Creative Education Trust (2019–)
- Specialist: Business & Enterprise
- Department for Education URN: 145952 Tables
- Ofsted: Reports
- Principal: Matt Irons
- Gender: Mixed
- Age: 11 to 16
- Colours: red and Grey
- Publication: The Bulwell Academy Newsletter
- Students: 1000 (approx)
- Learning Platform: http://learn.nottingham.sch.uk
- Website: http://www.bulwellacademy.org.uk

The Bulwell Academy (formerly Riverleen School and Henry Mellish School) is a large academy situated in Bulwell, Nottingham, England.

The Bulwell Academy has 1250 places for 11- to 16-year-olds with up to a further 250 places for post-16 students.
