= Dean of Sheffield =

Church of England senior clergy member

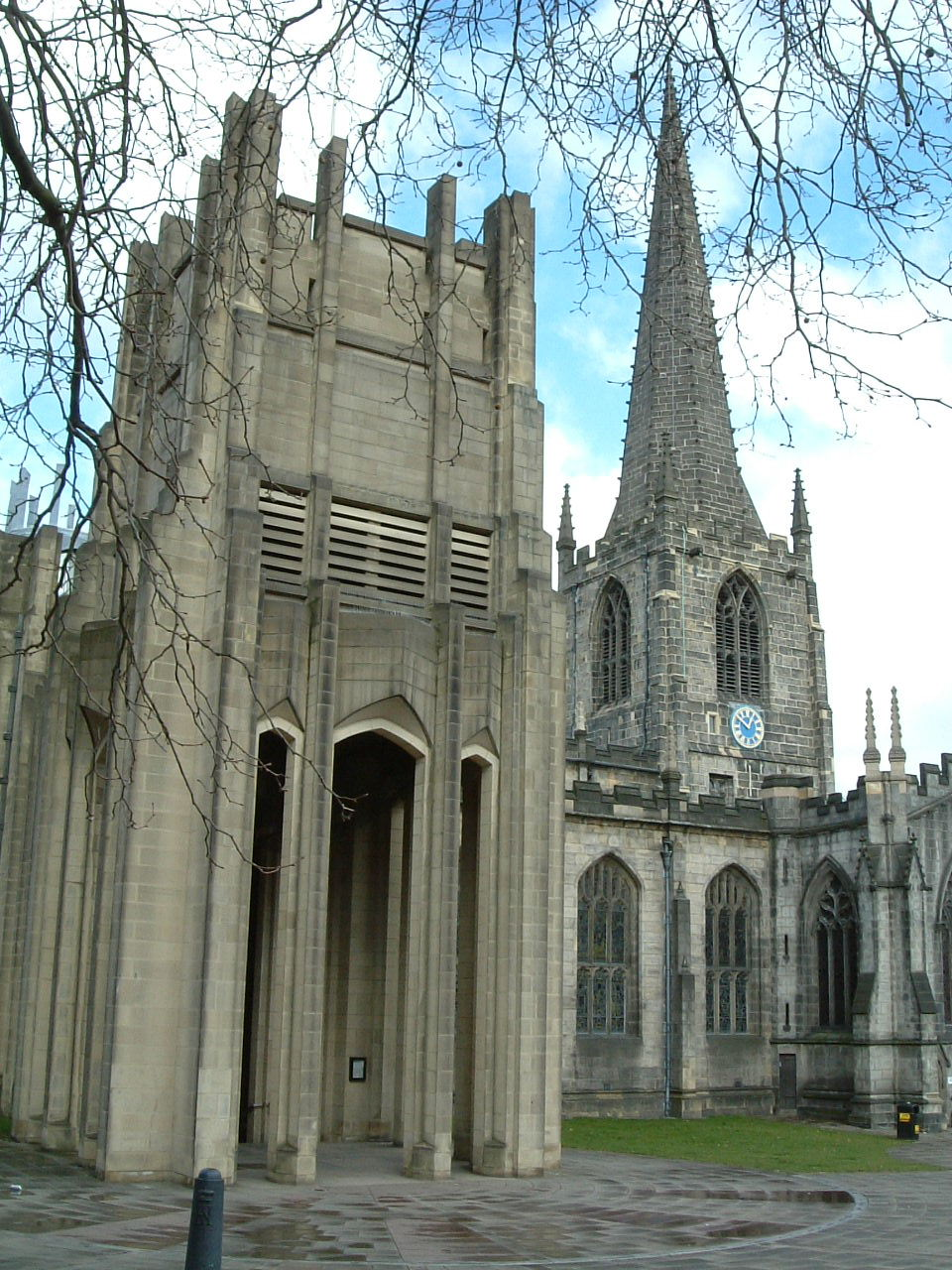
Sheffield Cathedral

The Dean of Sheffield is the head (primus inter pares – first among equals) and chair of the chapter of canons, the ruling body of Sheffield Cathedral. The dean and chapter are based at the Cathedral Church of Saint Peter and Saint Paul in Sheffield. Before 2000 the post was designated as a provost, which was then the equivalent of a dean at most English cathedrals. The cathedral is the mother church of the Diocese of Sheffield and seat of the Bishop of Sheffield.

== List of deans ==
=== Provosts ===
- 1931–1948 Alfred Jarvis
- 1949–1965 Howard Cruse
- 1966–1974 Ivan Neill
- 1974–1988 Frank Curtis
- 1988–1994 John Gladwin
- 1995–2000 Michael Sadgrove (became Dean)

=== Deans ===
- 2000–2003 Michael Sadgrove
- 2003–2020 Peter Bradley
- 2020–2021: Geoffrey Harbord (acting)
- 2021–present: Abi Thompson
