= Simon Hackett (academic) =

British child welfare researcher

Simon Hackett is a British academic and former social worker, who specialises in child protection and child maltreatment. He had been Principal of St Mary's College, Durham between September 2011 and 2018. From 2008 to 2011, he was Head of the School of Applied Social Sciences at Durham University. Before returning to Durham as a professor, he was a Tutor at the University of Manchester, a lecturer at Durham University, and Professor of Child Welfare at the University of Bedfordshire. He had also worked as a Child Protection Officer and in youth justice.

His research focuses on child abuse, safeguarding, and harmful sexual behaviour (HSB) in childhood and adolescence. He is known for developing the Hackett Continuum of Sexual Behaviour, co-authoring the AIM3 Assessment Framework, and contributing to the development of national and international policy, guidance and professional frameworks relating to harmful sexual behaviour. He is President of the Association for the Treatment and Prevention of Sexual Abuse (ATSA) and Professor Emeritus of Child Abuse and Neglect at Durham University.

Hackett’s work has focused on improving understanding of sexual behaviour in childhood and adolescence and developing evidence-informed approaches to assessment, intervention and prevention. His research, practice frameworks and policy contributions have been incorporated into safeguarding, child protection, education, health and youth justice guidance in the United Kingdom and internationally.

== Research and Contributions ==
=== Hackett Continuum of Sexual Behaviour ===
Hackett is associated with the development of the Hackett Continuum of Sexual Behaviour, first published in 2010.

The Continuum was developed as a conceptual framework to assist professionals in distinguishing between developmentally expected, concerning and harmful sexual behaviours in childhood and adolescence. It proposes that children’s sexual behaviour should be understood in relation to developmental stage, context, consent, reciprocity, power relationships and potential harm.

The framework has been incorporated into guidance published by organisations including the NSPCC and the Scottish Government and is referenced within safeguarding procedures, professional training materials and multi-agency responses to harmful sexual behaviour in the United Kingdom. It has also been referenced in policy and practice materials internationally.

A revised version of the Continuum was published in 2026, updating its terminology and conceptual structure in light of developments in research, policy and children’s rights perspectives.

=== AIM3 Assessment Framework ===
Hackett is co-author of the AIM3 Assessment Framework, a structured professional judgement model used in the assessment of adolescents who have displayed harmful sexual behaviour.

AIM3 is referenced in safeguarding procedures, children’s services guidance, youth justice practice materials and specialist harmful sexual behaviour services across the United Kingdom. The framework is used to support assessment, intervention planning, safeguarding decision-making and coordinated multi-agency responses.

== Policy and Practice Impact ==
Hackett has contributed to the development of national and international policy, guidance and professional frameworks relating to child sexual abuse and harmful sexual behaviour. His work has focused on strengthening evidence-informed responses to children and young people who display harmful sexual behaviour and supporting the development of safeguarding, assessment and intervention frameworks across a range of professional settings.

He chaired the practice development subgroup that developed the NSPCC Harmful Sexual Behaviour Framework and was one of its authors. The framework was designed to support organisations in reviewing and strengthening their responses to harmful sexual behaviour.

Hackett contributed to the development of guidance on harmful sexual behaviour in children and young people by the National Institute for Health and Care Excellence (NICE), including through expert testimony and evidence review work. He also serves on the Advisory Board of the Centre of Expertise on Child Sexual Abuse (CSA Centre).

He has provided expert evidence on harmful sexual behaviour to the Independent Inquiry into Child Sexual Abuse (IICSA), including evidence concerning harmful sexual behaviour between children and young people.

In 2024 he authored a Council of Europe evidence review examining sexual violence and harmful sexual behaviour displayed by children. He subsequently contributed to the development of Council of Europe guidance in this area.

Hackett also contributed to the development of Australia’s National Clinical and Therapeutic Framework for children and young people who have displayed concerning or harmful sexual behaviours.

== Professional Leadership ==
Hackett has held leadership roles within professional organisations concerned with the prevention of sexual abuse and the development of evidence-informed practice.

Between 2015 and 2019, he served as Chair of the National Organisation for the Treatment of Abuse (NOTA), the professional association for practitioners working in the field of sexual abuse prevention and treatment in the United Kingdom and Republic of Ireland.

He later served on the Board of Directors of the Association for the Treatment and Prevention of Sexual Abuse (ATSA). In 2026 he became President of ATSA.

== Honours and Recognition ==
Hackett was elected a Fellow of the Academy of Social Sciences in recognition of his contributions to research, policy and professional practice.

== Selected works ==
- Calder, Martin C.; Hackett, Simon, eds. (2013). Assessment in child care: using and developing frameworks for practice (2nd ed.). Lyme Regis: Russell House. ISBN 978-1905541850.
- Hackett, Simon (2014). Children and Young People with Harmful Sexual Behaviours. Dartington: Research In Practice. ISBN 978-1904984498.

Academic offices
Preceded by Phil Gilmartin	Principal of St Mary's College, Durham; 2011 to 2018	Succeeded by Maggi Dawn
