= Abi Thompson =

British Anglican priest

The Very Reverend Abigail Thompson
- Dean of Sheffield
- Church: Church of England
- Diocese: Sheffield
- In office: November 2021 – present
- Predecessor: Peter Bradley

Orders
- Ordination: 2006 (deacon); 2007 (priest)

Personal details
- Born: Abigail Laura Thompson; June 1975 (age 51)
- Denomination: Anglicanism
- Education: King's College, London; Westcott House, Cambridge

Abigail Laura Thompson (born June 1975), known as Abi Thompson, is a British Anglican priest. Since 2021, she has served as Dean of Sheffield.

== Life and career ==
Thompson was born in June 1975. She graduated in Music from King's College, London, and in Theology from Westcott House, Cambridge. She served as a curate in Sheffield Manor parish, and was ordained deacon in 2006 and priest in 2007. She was vicar of St James, Clifton in Rotherham within the Diocese of Sheffield from 2010 to 2018, and served as the diocesan Dean of Women's Ministry from 2015 to 2018. In 2018, she moved to the Diocese of St Albans, serving as the Acting Dean and Sub-Dean of St Albans Cathedral.

After her appointment as Dean of Sheffield was announced on 29 June 2021, she was installed as Dean on 6 November.

Church of England titles
Preceded by Peter Bradley	Dean of Sheffield; 2021–	incumbent
