= Elizabeth MacLeod Walls =

American academic administrator

14th President of Washington & Jefferson College
- Incumbent
- Assumed office June 30, 2024
- Preceded by: John C. Knapp

15th President of William Jewell College
- In office July 1, 2016 – June 30, 2024
- Preceded by: David Sallee
- Succeeded by: Susan Chambers (interim)

Personal details
- Born: January 8, 1974 (age 52)
- Spouse: Craig MacLeod Walls
- Children: 2
- Education: Hiram College (BA); Texas Christian University (PhD)
- Website: Official

Elizabeth MacLeod Walls (born January 8, 1974) is an American academic administrator serving as the 14th president of Washington & Jefferson College in Washington, Pennsylvania.

== Early life and education ==
MacLeod Walls was raised in Lincoln, Nebraska.

She earned a Bachelor of Arts in English and history from Hiram College, graduating Phi Beta Kappa. She then received a Doctor of Philosophy in English literature and rhetoric from Texas Christian University, graduating with highest distinction. She also attended Harvard University, where she completed their Management and Leadership in Education Program. She also is an alumna of the ACE Women’s Leadership Program and the Lilly Family School of Philanthropy Programs.

== Career ==
MacLeod Walls served as an administrator at Bryan College of Health Sciences in Lincoln Nebraska. She also taught at Nebraska Wesleyan University's English Department and served as executive director for a Lilly Endowment grant. In 2012, MacLeod Walls became the university's dean of University College.

MacLeod Walls became the 15th president of William Jewell College in Liberty, Missouri in 2016, succeeding David Sallee, who had retired. During her tenure, she aimed to rebrand William Jewell College as "The Critical Thinking College," implemented a 44% tuition reset to simplify pricing, and oversaw four consecutive years of enrollment growth. MacLeod’s tenure at William Jewell was also mired by financial difficulties that led to the College declaring financial exigency in December 2024.

In 2024, MacLeod was named the 14th president of Washington & Jefferson College, taking the place of John C. Knapp, who had announced retirement. She assumed her presidency on June 30, 2024.

== Awards and honors ==
In 2016, MacLeod Walls's co-edited text From Curlers to Chainsaws received the gold medal for the Independent Publisher Book Award for Anthology.

== Personal life ==
MacLeod Walls is married to Craig MacLeod and has two sons. She has a golden retriever, Buckeye, who is known as the First Dog of W&J.

== Selected publications ==
- Cognard-Black, Jennifer; MacLeod Walls, Elizabeth, eds. (2006). Kindred Hands: Letters on Writing by British and American Women Authors, 1865-1935. University of Iowa Press. ISBN 9780877459644.
- Forster, E. M. (2008). Lago, Mary; Hughes, Linda K.; MacLeod Walls, Elizabeth (eds.). The BBC talks of E.M. Forster, 1929-1960: a selected edition. Columbia: University of Missouri Press. ISBN 978-0-8262-1800-1. OCLC 183147364.
- Dyer, Joyce; Cognard-Black, Jennifer; MacLeod Walls, Elizabeth, eds. (2016). From Curlers to Chainsaws: Women and Their Machines. Michigan State University Press. doi:10.14321/j.ctt18j8z01. ISBN 978-1-61186-190-7.
