= St Mary's College, Durham =

Constituent college of Durham University

St Mary's College
- Durham University
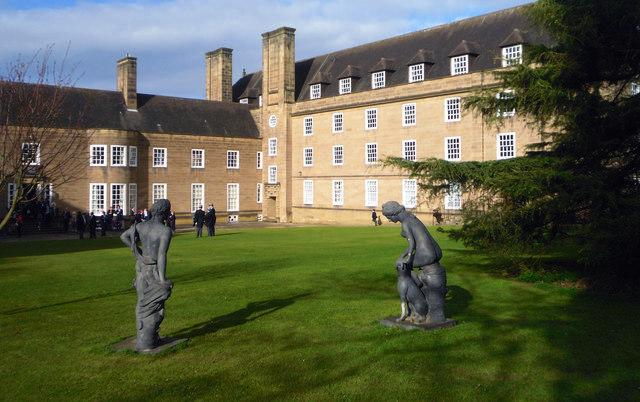
- St Mary's College Lawn

- Arms of St Mary's College; Arms: Argent, a cross formy quadrate gules; a chief azure, thereon a Durham mitre Or between two lilies proper.
- Coordinates: 54.7665°N 1.5778°W
- Latin name: Collegium Beatae Mariae
- Motto: Latin: Ancilla Domini
- Motto in English: The handmaid of the Lord
- Established: 1899
- Named for: Saint Mary
- Former names: The Women's Hostel
- Principal: Adrian Simpson
- Vice principal: Kate Morrey
- Undergraduates: 830
- Postgraduates: 270
- Website: St Mary's College; St Mary's JCR; St Mary's College MCR; St Mary's College Alumni; St Mary's Boat Club

Map
- Location within Durham, England

St Mary’s College is a constituent college of Durham University. It is located mainly on Elvet Hill to the South of the city centre, becoming the first of Durham’s "hill colleges". Following the grant of a supplemental charter in 1895 allowing women to receive degrees of the university, St Mary's was founded as a women’s only college called the Women’s Hostel in 1899, adopting its present name in May 1920. It enjoys a reputation as one of the most attractive colleges of Durham due to its neoclassical architecture and picturesque landscape.

St Mary's College is co-educational, having only begun to admit men in 2005, the last of Durham’s original single-sex colleges to do so. The college comprises around 750 undergraduate members as well as 150 full-time and 200 part-time postgraduates.

St Mary’s is considered one of the more traditional colleges. It is the only college in Durham that insist on gowns being worn at JCR meetings and also emphasises its use in formal halls. St Mary’s also holds its own matriculation ceremony in addition to the university-wide ceremony held in the Cathedral, where new students sign their name onto the college’s matriculation book, thereby sealing an oath to adhere to its customs and traditions. It also host 3 balls in an academic year, which are the Winter Ball in Michaelmas term, the Masquerade Ball in Epiphany term, and the Midsummer Ball in Easter term.

== History ==
=== Founding ===
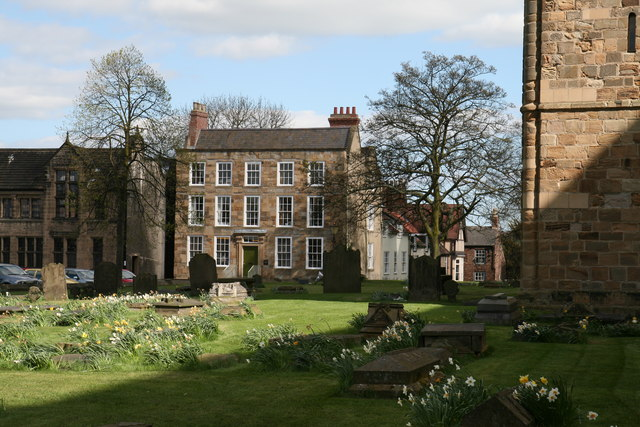
Abbey House

St Mary's first home was at 33 Claypath with six students, before moving into Abbey House on Palace Green, then to 9 The College behind Durham Cathedral, which is now occupied by the Chorister School.

In 1952, it moved to a new site on Elvet Hill, becoming the first of the "hill colleges". The foundation stone for the new building, now known as the Fergusson Building, was laid in 1947 by Princess Elizabeth (later Queen Elizabeth II). St Mary's is the only one of the hill colleges to have been founded in the 19th century.

=== Change to a mixed college ===
For several decades there had been debates about St Mary's continuing as a single-sex college within the university, and it had been originally mooted in the 1970s that it should go mixed. The Middle Common Room, which consisted of postgraduate students, went mixed in the early 1990s, and by the early twenty-first century had elected its first male MCR President (John Newton held the post from 2000 to 2001). St Mary's was the last of Durham's colleges to become entirely mixed when it took in both males and females at undergraduate level in 2005, ending over a hundred years of tradition. During the decision-making process the student body was split. Some members of the college felt so strongly against the proposed plans in 2000 that they protested, marching on the University Offices at Old Shire Hall. There had been several polls of the student body over the issue of the college going mixed, and from 1999 onwards these were held almost annually. The results tended to be close, but marginally in favour of retaining the status quo.

The transition to a mixed college took place in 2005, and the first male JCR President, James Liddell, was elected in 2009. The college still provides single-sex accommodation for both sexes as and when required. The recently refurbished Shepherd wing of the Fergusson building is a segregated women's-only area for students who, for personal, religious or other reasons, would prefer single sex accommodation. A refurbishment of the Williamson building took place between July and December 2007.

== Facilities and traditions ==
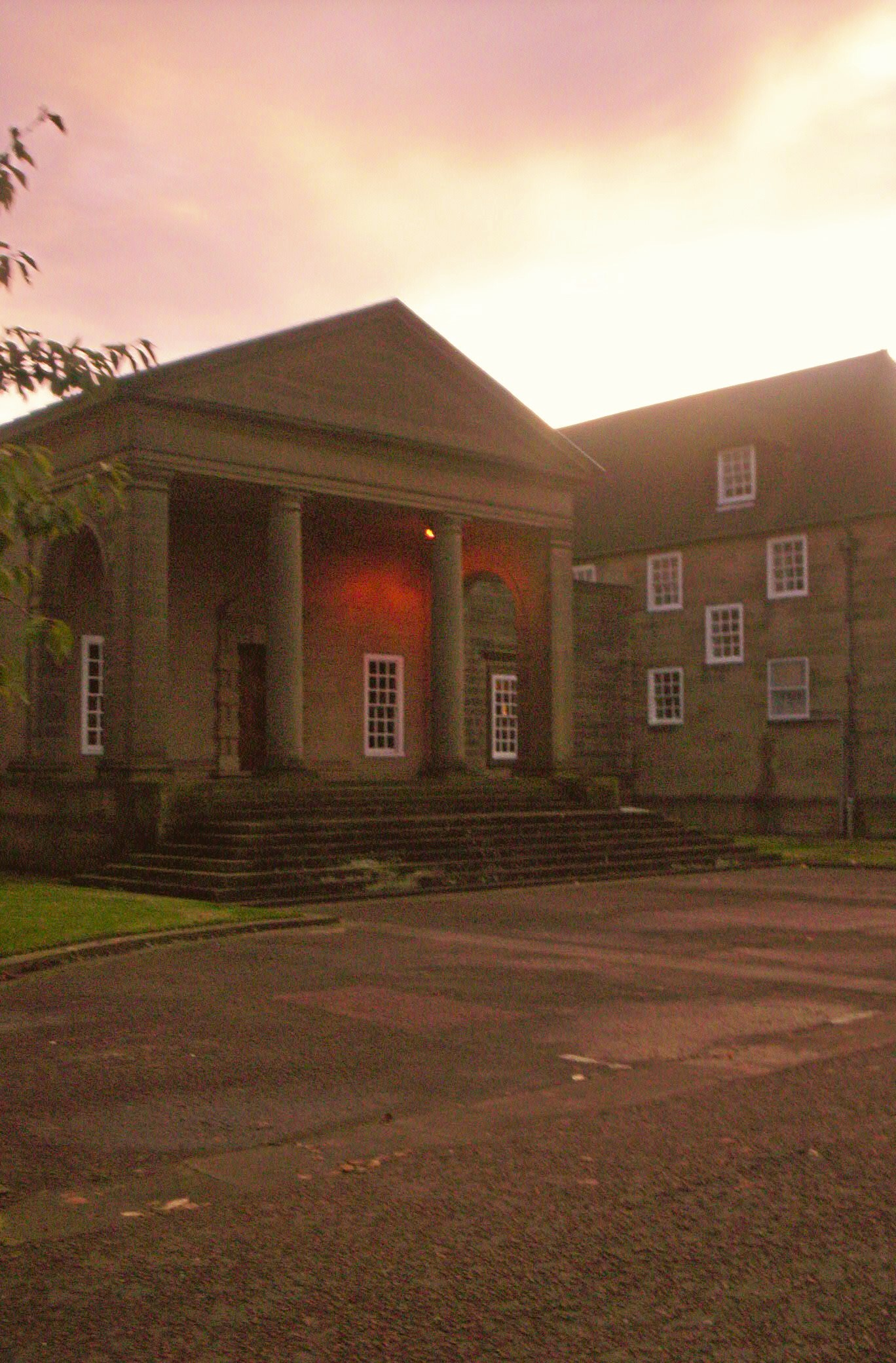
Entrance to St. Mary's College dining hall.

The college is centred on two main buildings: the Fergusson and Williamson Buildings. The Fergusson building, designed by Vincent Harris, was built in the early 1950s and houses most of the college facilities, including the college's dining hall, two computer rooms, the college library, the chapel, a laundry, two student common rooms and three music rooms. The chapel is located on the top floor of the North East wing and was designed by the ecclesiastical architect George Pace. In addition to interiors and furniture produced by Thompson of Kilburn (the Mouseman), it now houses a sculpture of the Blessed Virgin Mary by acclaimed sculptor Fenwick Lawson, which was commissioned in 2005 by the college.

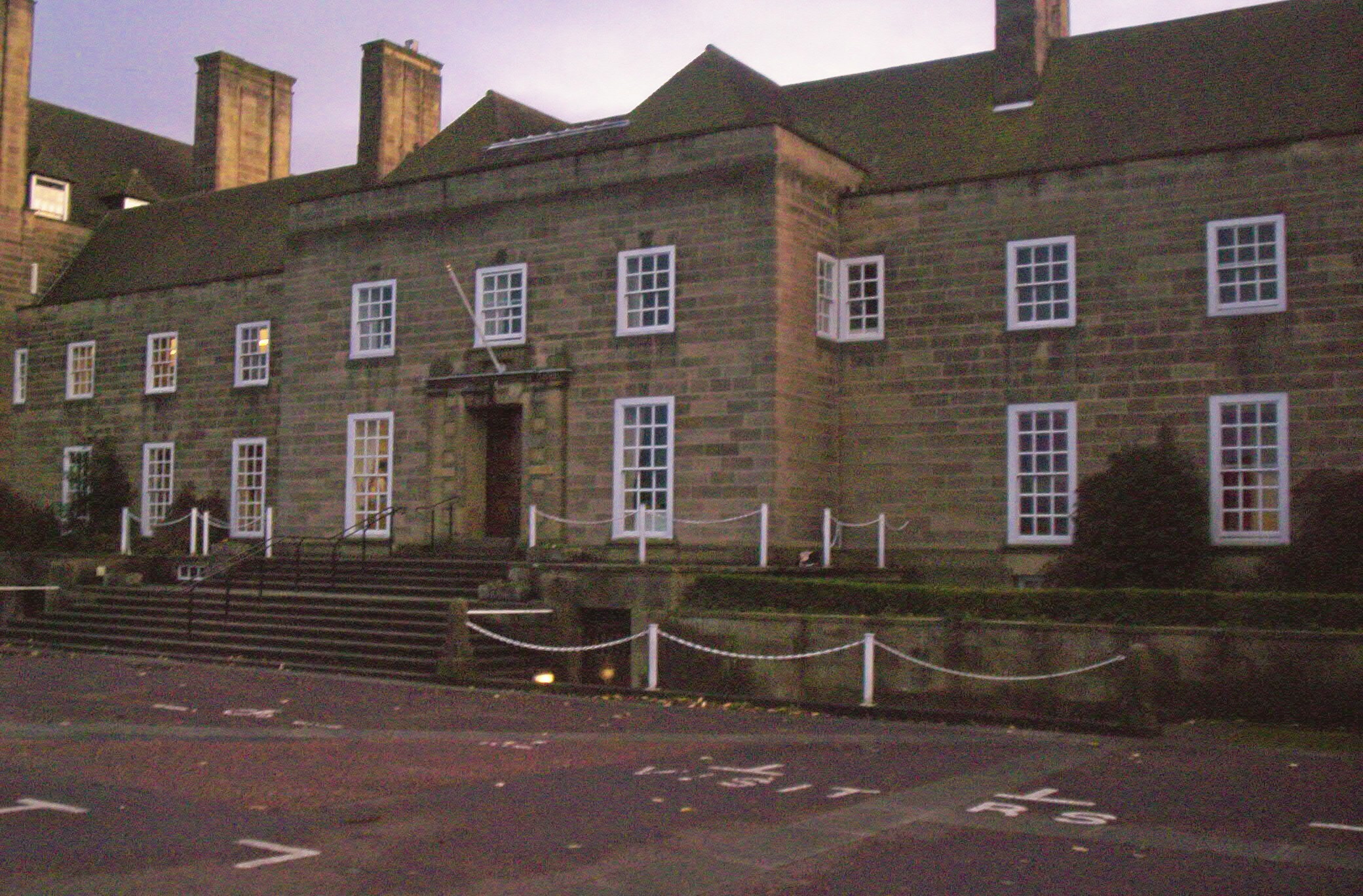
Main entrance to the Fergusson Building

The basement location of the Chapel prior to the 1960s now houses the JCR Bar which is managed by a Student Sabbatical Bars Steward. Opposite the Bar entrance is the Toastie Bar. At the other end of the basement is the JCR Shop which stocks sweets and snacks as well as toiletries, college clothing and some memorabilia.

The Williamson building was built in the early 1960s and is mainly an accommodation block with 110 study bedrooms. On the ground floor there is a student common room and one half of the lower ground floor contains the JCR fitness room and a laundry.

In the 1990s three ensuite blocks were built on to the front of the Williamson building and are the only ensuite rooms in the college, with the exception of a few located in the Shepherd Wing. These are mainly filled by 2nd, 3rd or 4th year students who move back into college accommodation, but some are made available to students from any year group who require an ensuite room for medical or personal reasons.

In 2015, principal Simon Hackett opened the new Boughton Wing in Williamson building which was established to maintain the provision of women-only accommodation to those who require it.

== Student life ==
The majority of students located on site are first years. St Mary's College used to operate a room ballot for first-year undergraduates, which involved moving room every term, but this is no longer the case and students normally remain in their allocated room for the full academic year. All those who live on site are fully catered during term time, except in exceptional circumstances.

Large student led events are held throughout the year. Notable highlights include the three Mary’s balls are held once per term: Winter, Masquerade, and Midsummer. The college requires the wearing of gowns at formal dinners, which are held between two and three times a term and on the first and last Sunday of each term. Furthermore, the college also requires gowns to be worn during JCR meetings and Matriculation.

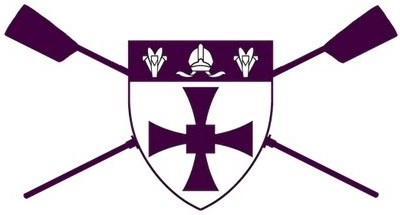
St Mary's College Boat Club Crest

The college has multiple sports clubs including but not limited to St Mary’s College Badminton Club, St Mary's College Boat Club, Mary’s Dance, St. Mary’s College Football Club, St Mary’s College Women’s Football Club, St Mary’s Hockey Club, Mary’s Lacrosse and St Mary’s College Netball Club.

The college also has multiple societies dedicated to activities such as jazz, bouldering, theatre, dance, journalism, origami, yoga, etc.

== College shield and arms ==
The college arms are blazoned as "Argent a Cross Formy Quadrate Gules a Chief Azure thereon a Durham Mitre Or between two Lilies proper."

The college's motto is "Ancilla Domini" and can be translated to "Handmaiden of the Lord."

== Gallery ==
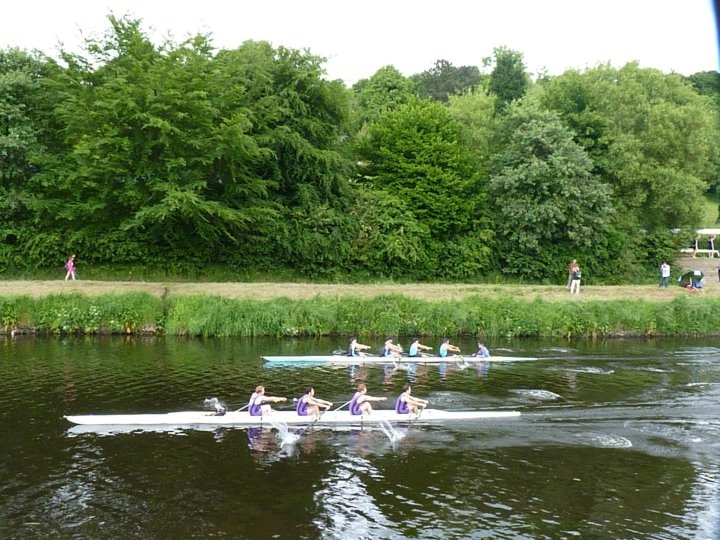
St. Mary's College Boat Club's Men's team racing on the Wear.

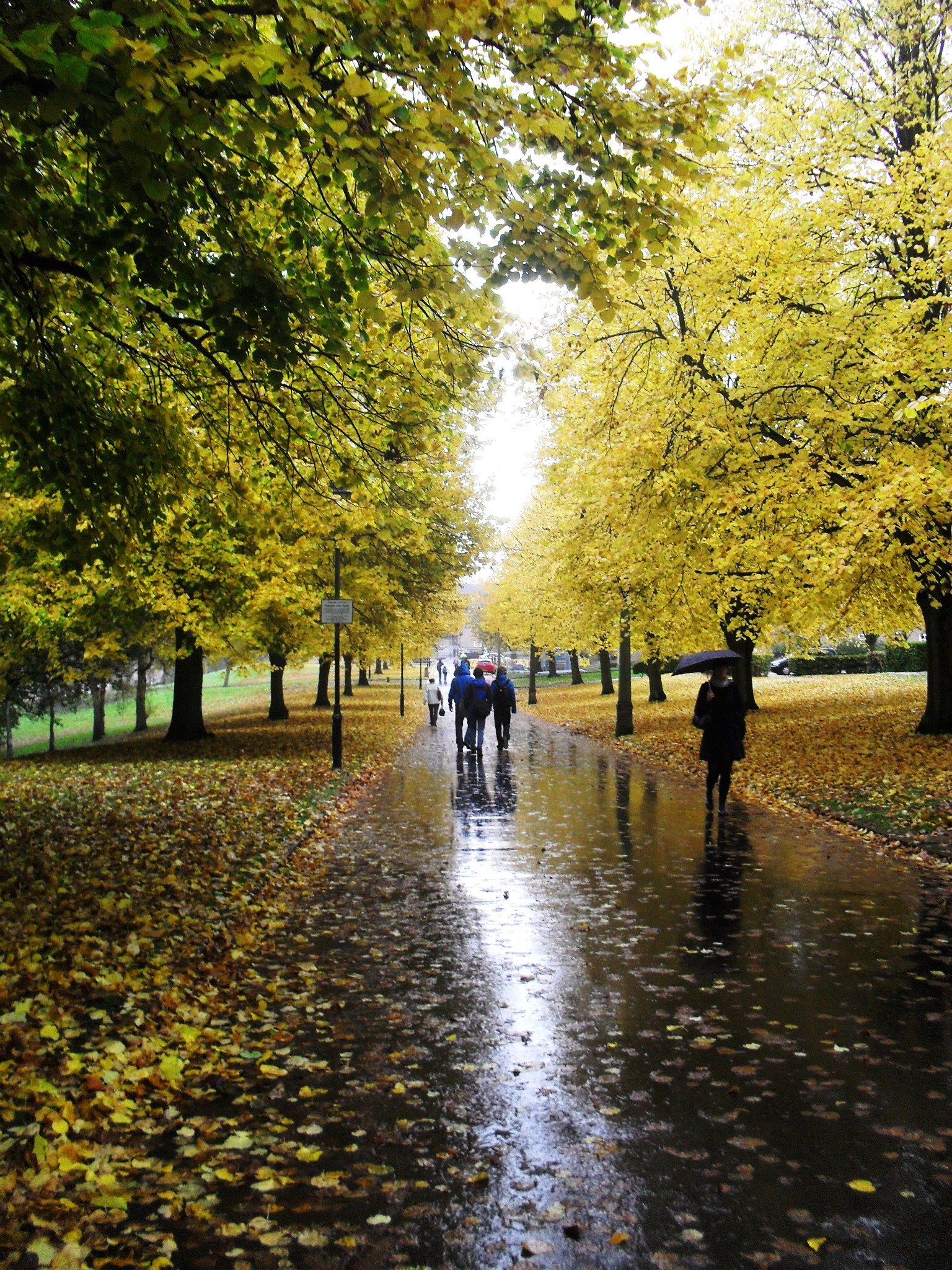
Entrance to the college.

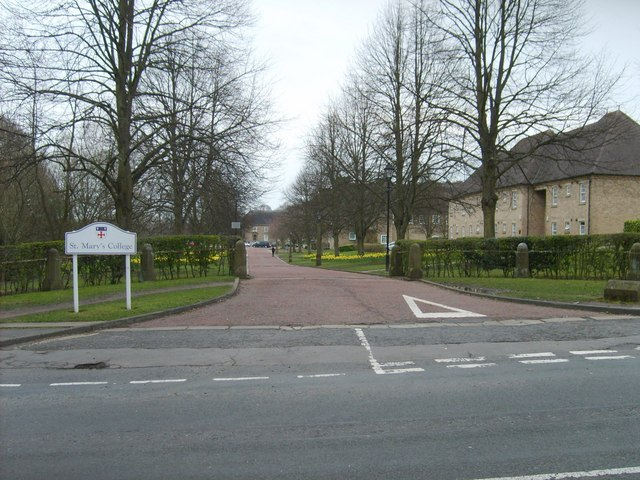
Sign for the entrance of the College on Quarryheads lane.

== List of Principals ==
- 1899 Laura Roberts
- 1900 Elizabeth Robinson
- 1913 Phyllis Wragge
- 1915 Rachel E D Donaldson
- 1940 Margaret B Fergusson
- 1955 Dame Elsie Marjorie Williamson
- 1962 Mary Holdsworth
- 1974 Florence I Prowse (née Calvert)
- 1977 Joan M Kenworthy
- 1999 Jenifer L Hobbs
- 2007 Phil Gilmartin
- 2011 Simon Hackett
- 2019 Maggi Dawn
- 2022 Adrian Simpson

== Notable alumni ==
- Jamie Atkinson - Hong Kong Cricket Captain
- Biddy Baxter - Children's TV presenter/radio host
- Holly Colvin - England International Cricketer
- Julia Copus - Poet and biographer
- Jane Griffiths - politician
- Katharine Gun - GCHQ translator and whistleblower
- Tom Harwood - Political journalist; deputy political editor of GB News
- Tracy Langlands - bronze medallist (World Championships) rower
- Jenny Willott - politician
- Ambika Mod - actress, writer, and comedian
- H F M Prescott - Author, academic, and historian. Vice Principal, St Mary's College 1944-48
