= Thomas Robertson (priest) =

English clergyman

Thomas Robertson was an English clergyman and Dean of Durham in the Tudor era.

Robertson was from Wakefield, Yorkshire and educated at Magdalen College, Oxford. In 1532 he published a book on grammar dedicated to the Bishop of Lincoln and was rewarded by being appointed Archdeacon of Leicester in 1541. He served on a number of commissions, including the one producing the Bishop's Book under Archbishop Thomas Cranmer and the one which investigated the validity of the marriage of Henry VIII and Anne of Cleves. He was also selected to join a group set up by the king to produce a standard Latin grammar.

In 1549 he was one of the committee led by Archbishop Cranmer which produced the First Prayer Book of Edward VI. A conservative at heart, he was appointed Dean of Durham under Mary I, keeping his Archdeaconry in commendam. On the accession of Queen Elizabeth he refused to subscribe to the Oath of Supremacy in 1559 and consequently forfeited his offices and retired to private life. He had also served as Vicar of Wakefield (1546 to 1559).
