= Phil Gilmartin =

British botanist

Phil Gilmartin, FLS is a British molecular biologist and botanist, who specialises in plant genetics. Since 2011, he has been Professor of Plant Molecular Genetics and Executive Dean of the Faculty of Science at the University of East Anglia (UEA). He had previously been Director of the Centre for Plant Sciences (1998–2004) and Pro-Dean for Research in the Faculty of Biological Sciences (2004–2007) at the University of Leeds, and Principal of St Mary's College, Durham (2008–2011).

Academic offices
Preceded by Jennifer Hobbs	Principal of St Mary's College, Durham; 2008 to 2011	Succeeded by Simon Hackett
