= St Bride's Church, Glasgow =

St Bride's Church
- The Parish Church of Saint Bride
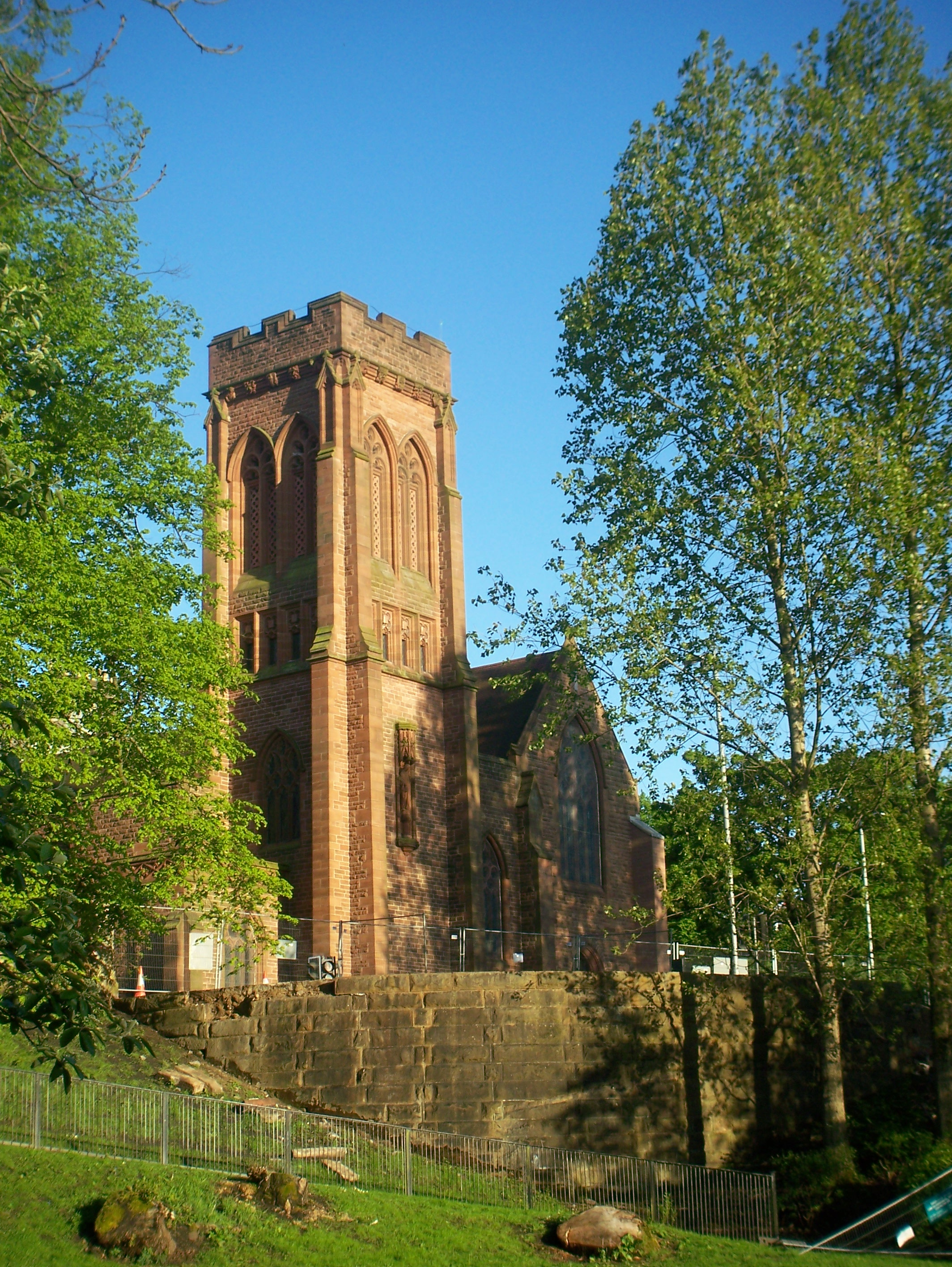
- St Bride's from Old Station Park
- St Bride's Church
- 55.879944°N 4.305139°W
- Location: Hyndland, Glasgow
- Country: Scotland
- Denomination: Scottish Episcopal Church
- Churchmanship: Anglo-Catholic

History
- Dedication: Brigid of Kildare
- Dedicated: 1907
- Consecrated: 1 February 1915

Architecture
- Architect: George Frederick Bodley
- Groundbreaking: 1903
- Completed: 1907

Specifications
- Materials: Red sandstone

Administration
- Diocese: Glasgow and Galloway

Clergy
- Bishop: Nicholas Bundock
- Priest: Peter Bradley

St Bride's Episcopal Church is situated in the Hyndland area of the West End of Glasgow, Scotland.

== History ==
In the late nineteenth century, a number of temporary church buildings were erected in the new suburbs developing around the West End of Glasgow. St Bride's began its life as one of these. In 1891, a group of local businessman put forward a proposal to erect a church in the Kelvinside area, on land provided at Beaconsfield Road by the owner of the Kelvinside estate, J. B. Fleming, one of the group. Members of the group included James Parker Smith, Liberal Unionist MP for Partick and owner of the Jordanhill estate; Francis Newbery, director of the Glasgow School of Art; William Kennedy of Hugh Kennedy and Sons, railway and public work contractors; and R. W. Shanks, a Partick fishmonger. Fleming became one of the trustees of the new church, along with Robert Young Pickering, managing director of railway carriage-builders R Y Pickering & Co Ltd. The church building itself was a small wooden chapel the group had acquired from the grounds of Douglas Castle, family seat of the Earls of Home, and sat 114 people. It was dedicated to St Bride of Kildare, patron saint of the Douglas family.

From 1891 to 1893, the church in Beaconsfield Road was served by curates from nearby St Mary's Cathedral on Great Western Road. In 1893, Pickering and Fleming provided funds of £250 a year for the church to have its own priest-in-charge until the end of 1897, and the Revd Theodore Younghughes was subsequently appointed.

=== Hyndland Road ===
Due to a subsequent falling-out with Fleming, who owned the land on which the church stood, it became necessary for the congregation to move. In 1899, a site on the Hyndland estate at Hanover Terrace (now Kingsborough Gardens) and Hyndland Road was selected, and the church building transported there. The spire was temporarily removed from the building to prevent damage to telephone wires, and a timber frame slid under the building, while soaped wooden runners were placed in front of it leading to the road. The frame carrying the church was then dragged by a traction engine over the runners and into the road. Wheels were attached to the frame allowing it to be pulled the half-mile route to its new home in just one hour. The church was open for business the next morning: a Sunday.

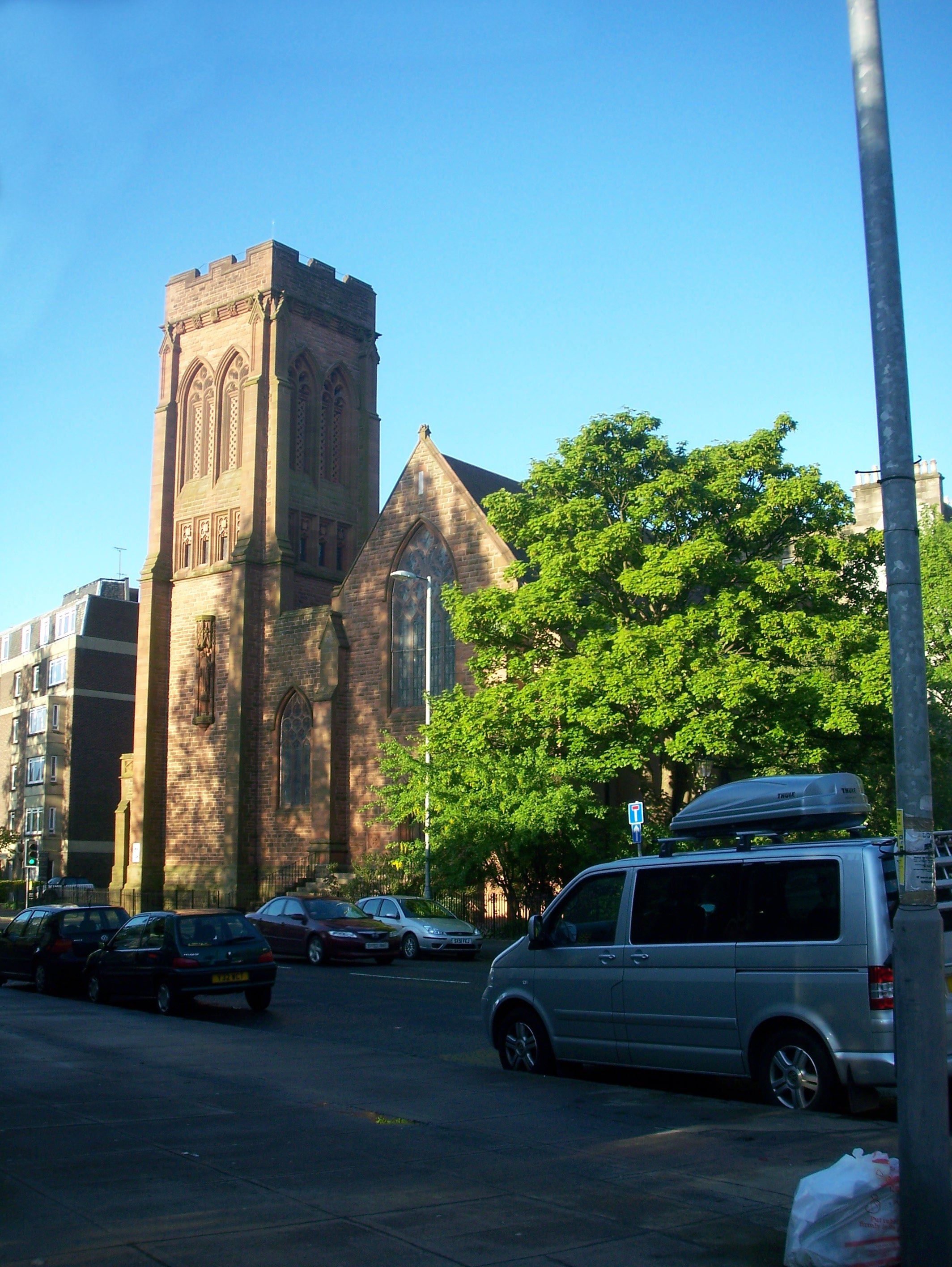
St Bride's from Hyndland Road

In 1899, having established a permanent location, St Bride's was promoted to being an 'incumbency', entitling it to have a Rector, to which post Theodore Younghughes was appointed. A permanent church building was required, and the noted ecclesiastical architect, George Frederick Bodley, was commissioned to draw up plans. His recent work had included St Salvador's Church in Dundee (his only other building in Scotland), the Chapel at Queens' College, Cambridge, and St Mary's Church in Eccleston, Cheshire, which bears a strong resemblance to St Bride's. Through the generous aid of a wealthy benefactress, Sarah Mackie, husband of James Logan Mackie of Mackie and Co., creator of White Horse whisky, progress on the building was swift; the foundation stone of the chancel was laid on 9 May 1903, and the chancel dedicated upon its completion on 30 April 1904; the foundation stone of the nave was then laid on 5 May 1906, with dedication on 25 May 1907. However, Mrs Mackie suffered a fatal heart attack shortly after, and work on the building ceased. In 1910, the Revd Younghughes resigned as rector, and Revd Edward Reid was appointed in his place.

The Revd Reid was the son of the late James Reid, partner in Neilson, Reid and Co., and came from a wealthy family. He and his brothers were great philanthropists, and Edward's particular interest lay in churches. He guaranteed the debts of St Bride's of £2,390, however inspections of the church building revealed shoddy workmanship on the nave, which had to be torn down. The Reid Brothers then provided the funds for the building of the church in memory of their sister, Elizabeth, who had died in 1912. The work was completed between 1913–1914, and the new building consecrated on 1 February 1915. It is a Category B listed building.

== See also ==
- Scottish Episcopal Church
- St Mary's Cathedral (Episcopalian)

Other churches nearby:

- St John's Renfield Church (Church of Scotland)
- Jordanhill Parish Church (Church of Scotland)
- Kelvinside Hillhead Parish Church (Church of Scotland)
- St Luke's Cathedral (Greek Orthodox)
- Wellington Church (Church of Scotland)
