= Peter Bradley (dean) =

American priest

The Reverend Peter Bradley
- Dean of Sheffield
- Church: Church of England
- Province: Province of York
- Diocese: Diocese of Sheffield
- Appointed: 2003
- In office: 2003–2020
- Predecessor: Michael Sadgrove

Orders
- Ordination: 1988 (deacon); 1989 (priest)

Personal details
- Born: Peter Edward Bradley; 26 June 1964 (age 62)
- Denomination: Anglican
- Education: Royal Belfast Academical Institution; Trinity Hall, Cambridge

Peter Edward Bradley DL FRSA (born 26 June 1964) is an Anglican priest who served as Dean of Sheffield, 2003–2020.

== Early life ==
Bradley was born on 26 June 1964. He was educated at the Royal Belfast Academical Institution, an all-boys grammar school in Belfast, Northern Ireland. He then studied at Trinity Hall, Cambridge.

== Ordained ministry ==
Bradley was ordained in the Church of England as a deacon in 1988 and as a priest in 1989. He became the Chaplain of Gonville and Caius College, Cambridge.

He was Team Vicar of St Michael and All Angels, Abingdon and All Saints', High Wycombe before his appointment as Dean of Sheffield. He was installed at Sheffield Cathedral on 4 October 2003; on 4 October 2020, Bradley announced his resignation from the Deanery with effect from 31 December 2020.

Since 2024, he has been priest-in-charge of St Bride's Church, Glasgow in the Scottish Episcopal Church.

== Interviews ==
Three-part interview conducted by Henk de Berg (2018)

-- Part I (on the existence of God)

-- Part II (on gay marriage and women priests)

-- Part III (on faith, violence and terrorism)

Church of England titles
Preceded by Michael Sadgrove	Dean of Sheffield; 2003–2020	Succeeded by Abi Thompson
