= HMS Vivacious =

Destroyer of the Royal Navy

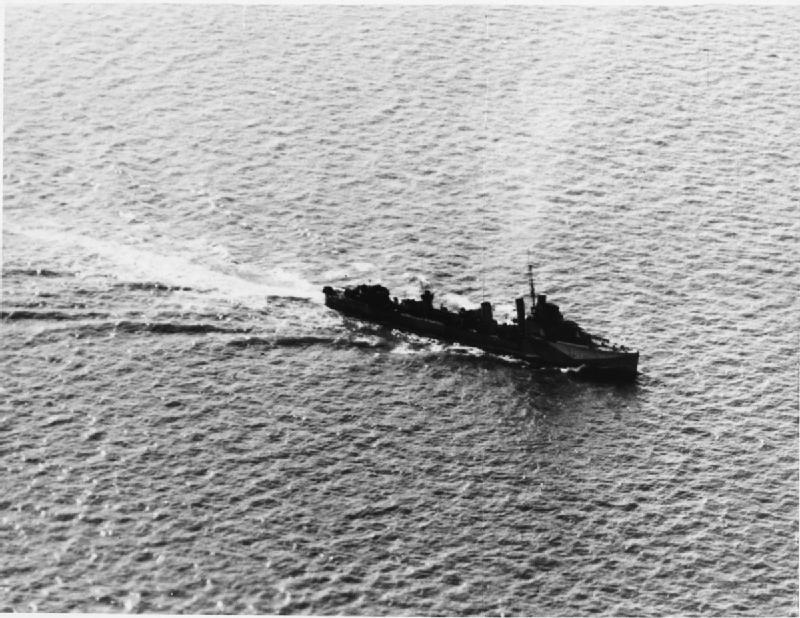
- HMS Vivacious during World War II

History

United Kingdom
- Name: HMS Vivacious
- Namesake: vivacious
- Ordered: 30 June 1916
- Builder: Yarrows, Glasgow
- Laid down: July 1916
- Launched: 3 November 1917
- Completed: December 1917
- Commissioned: 29 December 1917
- Decommissioned: mid-1930s
- Recommissioned: August 1939
- Decommissioned: summer 1945
- Motto: Sursum caudus ("Tails up")
- Honours and awards: Battle honours for: Atlantic 1939–1940; Dunkirk 1940; North Sea 1942–1945; Dover Straits 1942; Arctic 1943; English Channel 1943–1944; Normandy 1944
- Fate: Sold for scrapping 7 May 1947; Scrapping began 10 September 1948
- Badge: A gold squirrel on a green field

General characteristics
- Class & type: Admiralty V-class destroyer
- Displacement: 1,272–1,339 tons
- Length: 300 ft (91.4 m) o/a, 312 ft (95.1 m) p/p
- Beam: 26 ft 9 in (8.2 m)
- Draught: 9 ft (2.7 m) standard, 11 ft 3 in (3.4 m) deep
- Propulsion: 3 Yarrow type Water-tube boilers; Brown-Curtis steam turbines; 2 shafts, 27,000 shp
- Speed: 34 kt
- Range: 320–370 tons oil, 3,500 nmi at 15 kt, 900 nmi at 32 kt
- Complement: 110
- Armament: 4 × QF 4 in Mk.V (102 mm L/45), mount P Mk.I; 2 × QF 2 pdr Mk.II "pom-pom" (40 mm L/39) or; 1 z QF 12 pdr 20 cwt Mk.I (76 mm), mount HA Mk.II; 4 (2x2) tubes for 21 in torpedoes
- Notes: Pennant number: D36

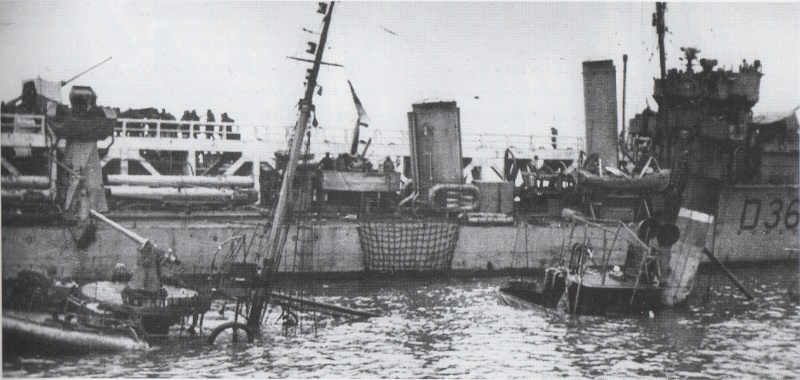
HMS Vivacious at Dunkirk, France, in late May 1940 during Operation Dynamo. A sunken ship is in the foreground.

HMS Vivacious (D36) was a V-class destroyer of the British Royal Navy that saw service in World War I and World War II.

== Construction and commissioning ==
Vivacious, the first Royal Navy ship of the name, was ordered on 30 June 1916 as part of the 9th Order of the 1916–17 Naval Programme. She was laid down in July 1916 by Yarrow Shipbuilders of Glasgow, Scotland, and launched on 3 November 1917. She was completed in December 1917 and commissioned on 29 December 1917.

== Service history ==
=== World War I and interwar years ===
Upon completion, Vivacious was fitted for use as a minelayer and entered service with the fleet during the final year of World War I. After the war, she deployed to the Baltic Sea in 1919 to participate in the British campaign there against Bolshevik forces during the Russian Civil War, seeing action against Russian warships. She later served in the Atlantic Fleet and the Mediterranean Fleet until decommissioned and placed in reserve at Rosyth Scotland, in the mid-1930s.

In August 1939, Vivacious was recommissioned with a reserve crew for the review of the Reserve Fleet by King George VI at Weymouth.

=== World War II ===
==== 1939–1941 ====
Vivacious remained in commission after the United Kingdom entered World War II in September 1939, assigned to the 17th Destroyer Flotilla at Plymouth for convoy escort and patrol duties in the English Channel and the Southwestern Approaches, she escorted an 18-ship convoy carrying supplies, ammunition, and vehicles for the British Expeditionary Force from the United Kingdom to Cherbourg, France, on 10 September 1939. From 15 to 16 December 1939 she provided escort for Convoy HG 10 during a portion of its passage from Gibraltar to Liverpool.

On 12 April 1940, Vivacious and the destroyers HMS Broke and HMS Verity joined Convoy HG 25, bound from Gibraltar to Liverpool, to reinforce its escort, which had consisted only of the sloops HMS Bideford and HMS Fowey. After arriving at Liverpool on 15 April 1940, Vivacious remained based there.

On 12 May 1940, as German forces conquered the Netherlands, Vivacious and the destroyer HMS Venetia escorted the destroyer HMS Codrington as Codrington transported the Dutch royal family from the Hook of Holland into exile in the United Kingdom in Operation J.

On 26 May 1940, Vivacious was chosen to participate in Operation Dynamo, the evacuation of Allied troops from Dunkirk, France, and she departed Dover that day in company with the light cruiser HMS Calcutta and the destroyers HMS Gallant, HMS Greyhound, HMS Griffin, HMS Impulsive, HMS Sabre, and HMS Wakeful. She began patrols the following day to protect the evacuation beachhead from attacks by German aircraft and motor torpedo boats (S-boats, known to the Allies as "E-boats"). She made two trips from Dunkirk to Dover on 28 May 1940, evacuating 326 men on the first one and 359 on the second, and on 30 May 1940 she carried 537 more men from Dunkirk to Dover. German howitzers ashore fired on her on 31 May 1940 while she was off Bray-Dunes, France, inflicting 15 casualties on her crew. She took 427 more men from Dunkirk to Dover on 1 June 1940. She also took part in Operation OK on 3 June 1940, in which blockships were sunk to block the harbor at Dunkirk; She took aboard the crews of the sunken ships and brought them to Dover. One of those rescued from Dunkirk was the Rev Ivan Neill who would later become the Chaplain General.

After the evacuation was complete, Vivacious was transferred to the 21st Destroyer Flotilla at Sheerness on 7 June 1940 for convoy escort and anti-invasion patrol duty in the North Sea. While escorting Convoy FN 288 from Southend to Methil on 22 September 1940, a mine detonated near her, causing damage that was not fully repaired until mid-1941. In 1941, after the threat of invasion subsided, she began to participate in the interception of German S-boats in the North Sea to prevent them from attacking convoys in addition to her other duties.

==== The Channel Dash, 1942 ====
Vivacious was on exercises with the destroyer leader HMS Campbell and the destroyer HMS Worcester of her own flotilla and the destroyer leader HMS Mackay and destroyers HMS Walpole and HMS Whitshed of the 16th Destroyer Flotilla on 12 February 1942 when Nazi Germany's Kriegsmarine surprised the British by steaming the battleships Scharnhorst and Gneisenau and the heavy cruiser Prinz Eugen at high speed from France to Germany via the English Channel, Strait of Dover, and North Sea in Operation Cerberus, which became known as the "Channel Dash". The Royal Navy and Royal Air Force had virtually no forces available to oppose them, so the Admiralty ordered the six destroyers to abort their exercises and make torpedo attacks against the German heavy ships. Vivacious was the first to attack and did not suffer any major damage or casualties despite the heavy escort and air cover the Germans had provided for the passage, but the attacks were unsuccessful and the German ships succeeded in making port in Germany.

==== 1942–1945 ====
After the Channel Dash, Vivacious returned to her normal North Sea duties. She was "adopted" by the civil community of Solihull, then in Warwickshire, in March 1942 in a Warship Week National Savings campaign, and she collided with the destroyer HMS Vesper on 31 August 1942. In January 1943, she was chosen for detached duty with the Home Fleet to assist in the defense of Arctic convoys steaming to and from the Soviet Union. On 5 February 1943 she and the escort destroyers HMS Blankney and HMS Middleton deployed to provide local escort for Convoy RA 52 during the final leg of its voyage from the Soviet Union. In March 1943, she joined the escort destroyers HMS Meynell and HMS Pytchley in providing similar escort services for Convoy RA 53. She returned to the 21st Destroyer Flotilla and her North Sea duties in April 1943.

In May 1944, Vivacious was selected to form Escort Group 103 with Campbell, the corvettes HMS Clover and HMS Pennywort, and Motor Launches of the Coastal Forces to operate in Force L during Operation Neptune to provide escort for convoys bringing reinforcements and supplies to the beachhead in the days following the initial assault of the Allied invasion of Normandy. She began service with the escort group in early June 1944 in the Thames Estuary and commenced escort duty on 8 June 1944, two days after the initial landings, when the 103rd Escort Group, supplemented by the corvettes HMS Poppy and HMS Statice, escorted Convoy ETM 3, consisting of 14 motor transport ships, from the Thames Estuary to The Solent. The following day, she took part in escorting Convoys ETM 33 and ETM 3W to the beachhead, then returned to the Nore. She continued convoy protection duties related to the invasion until released from Operation Neptune toward the end of June 1944.

In July 1944, Vivacious returned to the 21st Destroyer Flotilla and convoy escort and patrol duties in the North Sea and English Channel, continuing them until the surrender of Germany in early May 1945. After that she operated in support of reoccupation forces and on 15 May 1945, joined the destroyer HMS Woolston in escorting minesweepers during minesweeping operations at Bergen, Norway.

== Decommissioning and disposal ==
Vivacious was decommissioned during the summer of 1945 – she was no longer carried on the Royal Navy's active list as of July 1945 – and was in reserve until placed on the disposal list in 1947. She was sold on 17 May 1947 to BISCO for scrapping by Metal Industries and arrived at the shipbreaker's yard on 10 September 1948.

== In fiction ==
HMS Vivacious, along with her sister ship HMS Vanquisher, is depicted in Christopher Nolan's film Dunkirk, using the postwar French Navy destroyer Maillé-Brézé as a stand-in for both. The film ahistorically depicts Vivacious being torpedoed and sunk by a U-boat during the Dunkirk evacuation (using a replica on the Universal Studios Lot).

== Bibliography ==
- Campbell, John (1985). Naval Weapons of World War II. Annapolis, Maryland: Naval Institute Press. ISBN 0-87021-459-4.
- Chesneau, Roger, ed. (1980). Conway's All the World's Fighting Ships 1922–1946. Greenwich, UK: Conway Maritime Press. ISBN 0-85177-146-7.
- Colledge, J. J.; Warlow, Ben (2006) [1969]. Ships of the Royal Navy: The Complete Record of All Fighting Ships of the Royal Navy from the 15th Century to the Present (3rd Rev ed.). London: Chatham Publishing. ISBN 978-1-86176-281-8. OCLC 67375475.
- Cocker, Maurice. Destroyers of the Royal Navy, 1893–1981. Ian Allan. ISBN 0-7110-1075-7.
- Friedman, Norman (2009). British Destroyers From Earliest Days to the Second World War. Annapolis, Maryland: Naval Institute Press. ISBN 978-1-59114-081-8.
- Gardiner, Robert & Gray, Randal, eds. (1985). Conway's All the World's Fighting Ships 1906–1921. Annapolis, Maryland: Naval Institute Press. ISBN 0-85177-245-5.
- Lenton, H. T. (1998). British & Empire Warships of the Second World War. Annapolis, Maryland: Naval Institute Press. ISBN 1-55750-048-7.
- March, Edgar J. (1966). British Destroyers: A History of Development, 1892–1953; Drawn by Admiralty Permission From Official Records & Returns, Ships' Covers & Building Plans. London: Seeley Service. OCLC 164893555.
- Preston, Antony (1971). 'V & W' Class Destroyers 1917–1945. London: Macdonald. OCLC 464542895.
- Raven, Alan & Roberts, John (1979). 'V' and 'W' Class Destroyers. Man o'War. Vol. 2. London: Arms & Armour. ISBN 0-85368-233-X.
- Rohwer, Jürgen (2005). Chronology of the War at Sea 1939–1945: The Naval History of World War Two (Third Revised ed.). Annapolis, Maryland: Naval Institute Press. ISBN 1-59114-119-2.
- Whinney, Bob (2000). The U-boat Peril: A Fight for Survival. Cassell. ISBN 0-304-35132-6.
- Whitley, M. J. (1988). Destroyers of World War 2. Annapolis, Maryland: Naval Institute Press. ISBN 0-87021-326-1.
- Winser, John de D. (1999). B.E.F. Ships Before, At and After Dunkirk. Gravesend, Kent: World Ship Society. ISBN 0-905617-91-6.
