= Thomas Lisieux =

Thomas Lisieux (died 1456) was a Canon of Windsor from 1435 to 1442 and Dean of St Paul’s from 1441 to 1456.

== Career ==
He was appointed:

- Senior Proctor, Oxford 1426
- Rector of St Michael, Cornhill 1433 - 1447
- Prebendary of Rugmere in St Paul’s Cathedral 1436 - 1452
- Prebendary of Totenhall in St Paul’s Cathedral 1452 - 1456
- Dean of St Paul’s 1441 - 1456
- Prebendary of Henfield in Chichester Cathedral 1443
- Treasurer of the collegiate church of Abergelly, St David’s.
- Prebendary of Church of St. Mary Magdalene, Bridgnorth
- Keeper of the Privy Seal 1450 – 1456

He was appointed to the twelfth stall in St George's Chapel, Windsor Castle in 1435, and held the stall until 1442.
