= Michael Sadgrove =

English priest (born 1950)

The Very Reverend Michael Sadgrove
- Dean of Durham
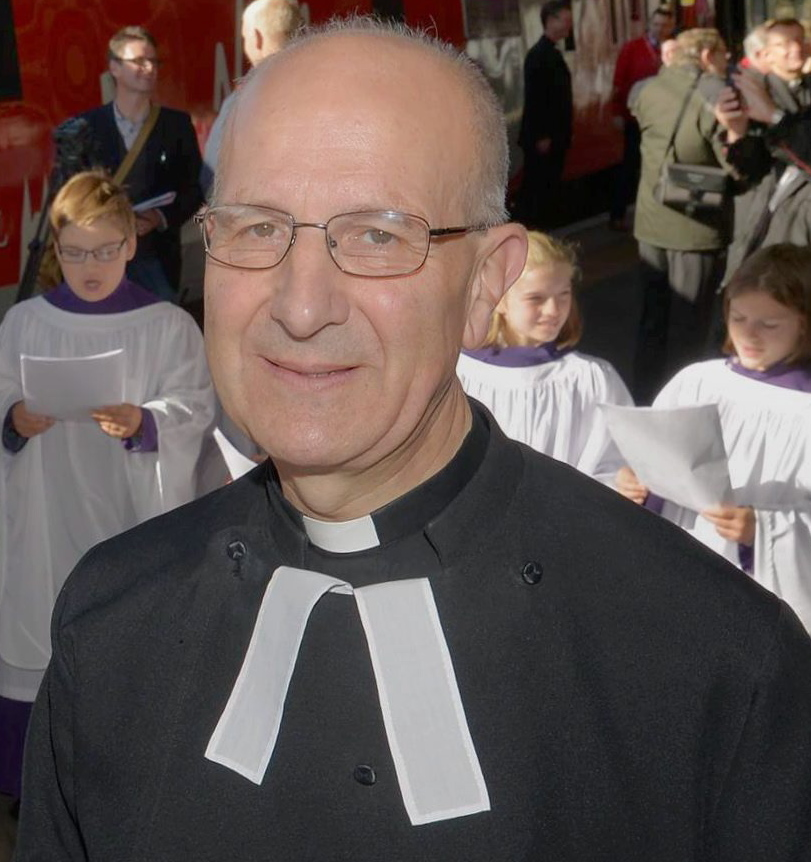
- Sadgrove in 2015
- Church: Church of England
- Diocese: Diocese of Durham
- In office: 2003–31 December 2015 (retired)
- Predecessor: John Arnold
- Successor: Andrew Tremlett
- Other post: Dean of Sheffield (1995–2003)

Orders
- Ordination: 1975 (deacon); 1976 (priest)

Personal details
- Children: Four
- Education: University College School
- Alma mater: Balliol College, Oxford

Michael Sadgrove (born 13 April 1950) is a Church of England priest and noted theological author. Between 2003 and 2015, he was Dean of Durham. From 1995 to 2003, he was Provost, then Dean of Sheffield Cathedral. He is now Dean Emeritus of Durham.

== Early life ==
Sadgrove was born on 13 April 1950 of mixed Anglican-Jewish parentage. He was educated at University College School, a private school in London. He first studied mathematics and philosophy, followed by further studies in theology at Balliol College, Oxford, and graduated with a Bachelor of Arts (BA) degree in 1971; as per tradition, his BA was promoted to a Master of Arts (MA Oxon) degree in 1975. In 1972, he entered Trinity College, Bristol, an Evangelical Anglican theological college, to train for ordained ministry.

== Ordained ministry ==
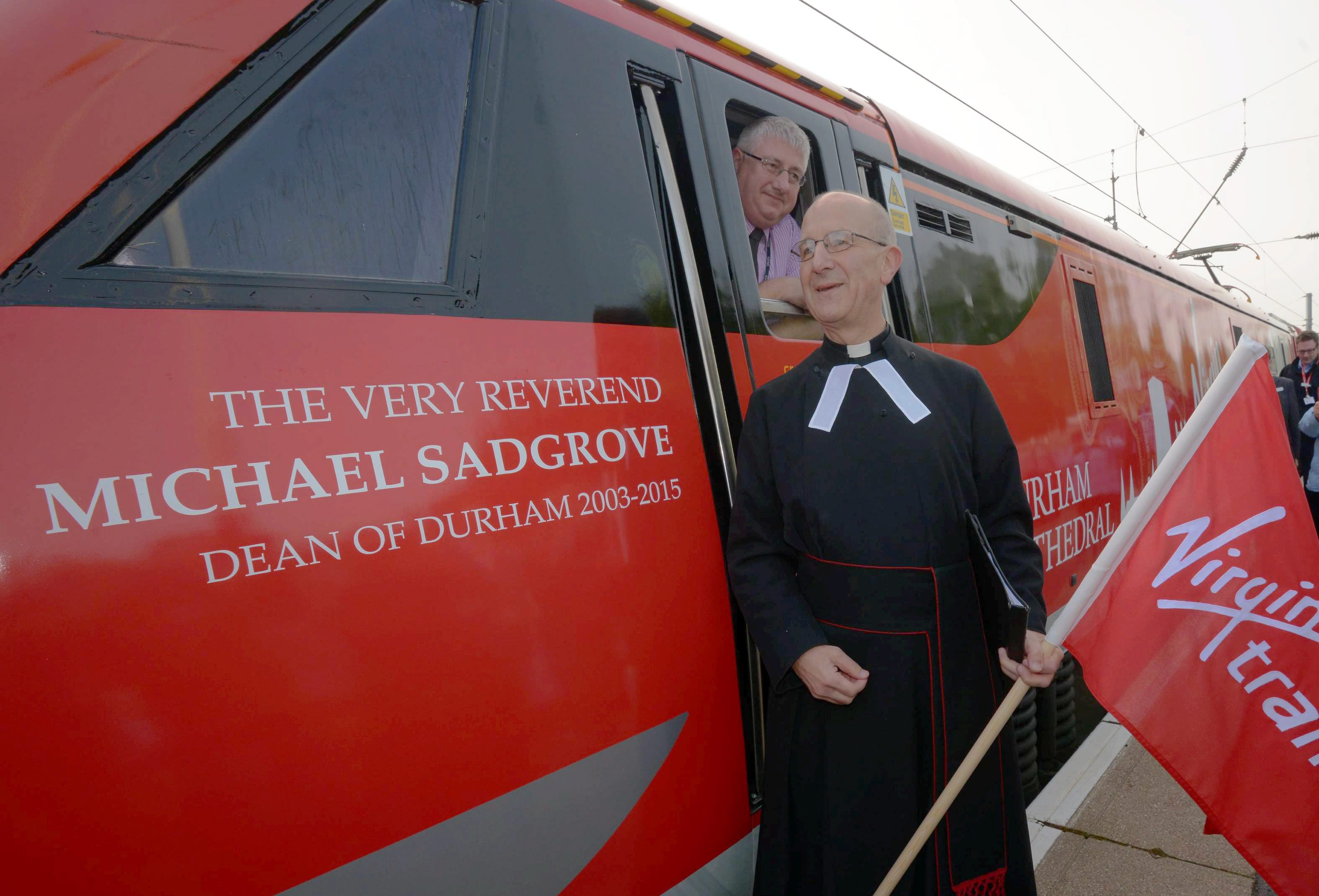
Sadgrove naming a Virgin Trains East Coast locomotive at Durham railway station in 2015

Sadgrove was ordained in the Church of England: made a deacon at Petertide 1975 (29 June) at St Andrew's Church, Headington, and ordained a priest the Petertide following (13 June 1976) at Balliol College Chapel, both times by Peter Walker, Bishop of Dorchester. He held permission to officiate in the Diocese of Oxford from 1975 to 1977, and served his curacy at St Andrew's Headington where he was ordained deacon. He was a Tutor in Old Testament studies at Sarum College from 1977 until 1982 and an honorary Vicar Choral at Salisbury Cathedral. He was then the Vicar of Alnwick, Northumberland, between 1982 and 1987. From 1987 to 1995 he was Vice Provost, a Canon Residentiary and Precentor at Coventry Cathedral.

Between 1995 and 2003, he was provost, then dean from 13 April 2000, of Sheffield Cathedral. In October 2002, it was announced that he would be moving to Durham Cathedral as their new dean. He was installed as Dean of Durham in March 2003. During his incumbency, the Cathedral opened up choristerships to girls as a separate top line in the choir on an equal basis to the boy choristers. He was instrumental in initiating a major development project "Open Treasure", a reconfiguring of the historic spaces round the cloister as an interpretation of the North East's Christian heritage. He played a significant part in bringing the Lindisfarne Gospels back to their historic home for a three-month residency in Durham during 2013. Sadgrove briefly achieved national prominence in the same year when he wrote an open letter questioning the political attitudes of the then manager of Sunderland FC, Paulo di Canio. In March 2015, it was announced that he would be retiring from full-time ministry. He led his final service as Dean on 27 September 2015. He officially retired on 31 December 2015.

As Dean of Durham, he was an ex officio a governor of Durham University. Until June 2016 he was also rector (titular head) of St Chad's College, Durham.

=== Views ===
In early 2016 prior to the UK referendum on membership of the European Union, he launched "Christians for Europe" advocating the UK's continued membership of the EU from a Christian perspective.

In 2023, he described himself as a "post-evangelical catholic Anglican".

== Personal life ==
Sadgrove is married and has four children; three daughters and a son. His wife is a psychotherapist. He lives in Northumberland where he continues to be engaged in theological writing and speaking, church matters, European issues, arts and heritage, and the culture of North East England. He blogs regularly on a variety of subjects.

On 9 June 2011, he was appointed a Deputy Lieutenant (DL) of County Durham, a title he relinquished on leaving the county on his retirement.

== Selected works ==
- Sadgrove, Michael (1992). Coventry Cathedral. Pitkin Pictorials. ISBN 0853724571.
- Sadgrove, Michael (1995). A picture of faith: a meditation on the imagery of Christ in glory. Kevin Mayhew. ISBN 0862095263
- Sadgrove, Michael (2006). The Eight Words of Jesus in the Passion according to St John. London: SPCK. ISBN 0281058733.
- Sadgrove, Michael (2008). Wisdom and ministry: the call to leadership. London: SPCK. ISBN 978-0281059973.
- Sadgrove, Michael (2009). I will trust in you: a companion to the evening Psalms. London: SPCK. ISBN 978-0281059874.
- Sadgrove, Michael; Nixon, Philip (2013). Durham cathedral: a pilgrimage in photographs. Amberley Publishing. ISBN 978-1445613161.
- Sadgrove, Michael; Horsler, Val; Tristram, Kate (2013). Landscapes of faith: the Christian heritage of the North East. London: Third Millennium. ISBN 978-1906507893.
- Sadgrove, Michael (2015). Christ in a Choppie Box: sermons from North East England. Sacristy Press. ISBN 9781910519103.

Church of England titles
Preceded by John Gladwin	Dean of Sheffield; 1995–2003	Succeeded by Peter Bradley
Preceded by John Arnold	Dean of Durham; 2003–2015	Succeeded by Andrew Tremlett
