= Dean of Durham =

Church of England senior clergy member

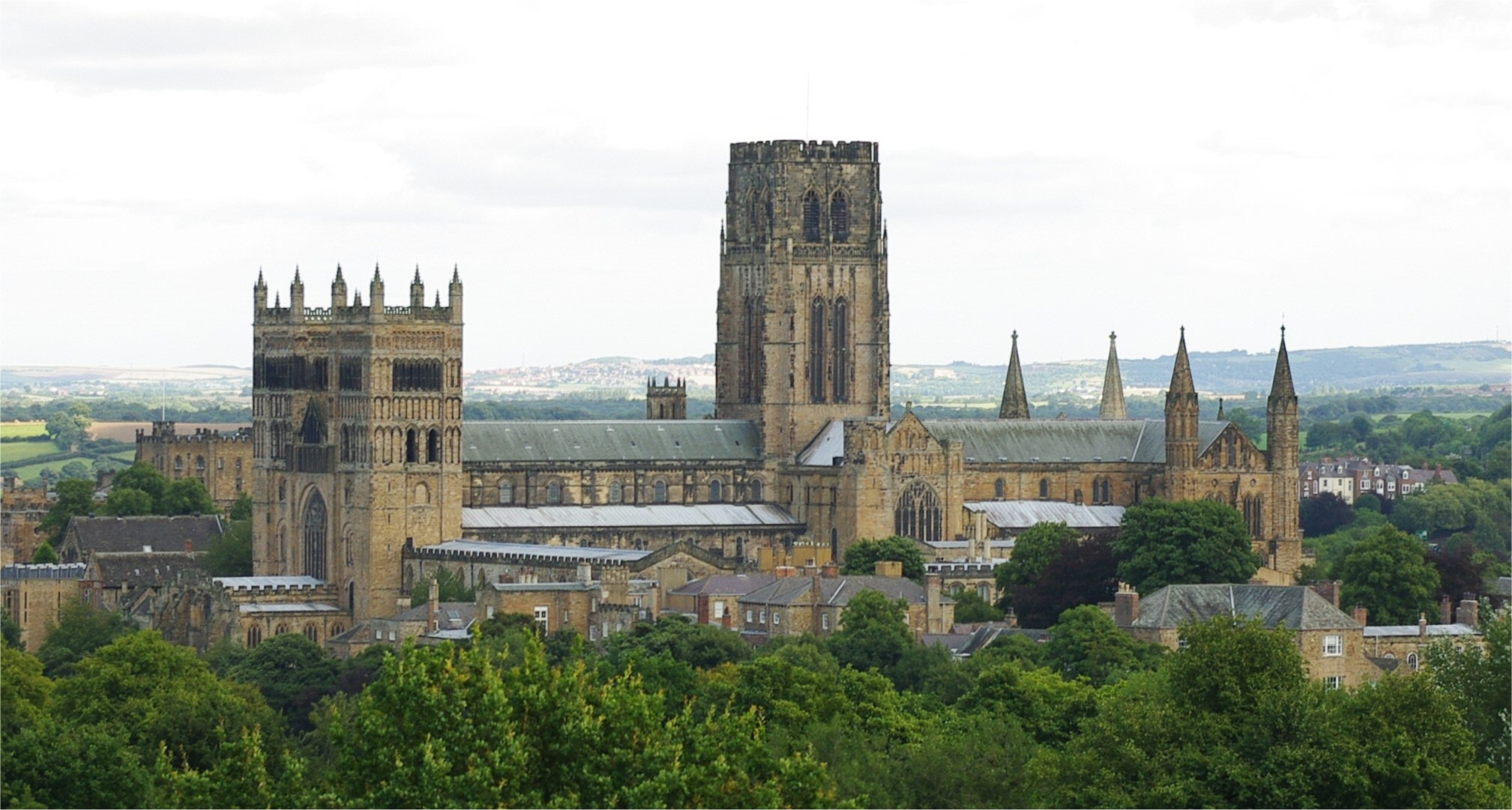
Durham Cathedral

The Dean of Durham is the "head" (primus inter pares – first among equals) and chair of the Chapter, the ruling body of Durham Cathedral. The dean and chapter are based at the Cathedral Church of Christ, Blessed Mary the Virgin and St Cuthbert of Durham in Durham. The cathedral is the mother church of the Diocese of Durham and seat of the Bishop of Durham. The dean was also previously the head (warden) of Durham University until 1909, and continues to be an ex officio member of the university council.

The dean's official residence is the Deanery, excluding episcopal palaces the largest residence in the Church of England, which adjoins the cathedral cloister and faces onto the cathedral college.

== List of deans ==
=== Early modern ===
- 1541–1551 Hugh Whitehead (last prior)
- 1551–1553 Robert Horne
- 1553–1558 Thomas Watson
- 1558–1559 Thomas Robertson (deprived)
- 1559–1561 Robert Horne (again)
- 1561–1563 Ralph Skinner
- 1563–1579 William Whittingham
- 1580–1581 Thomas Wilson (Lay dean)
- 1583–1595 Tobias Matthew
- 1596–1606 William James
- 1606–1620 Adam Newton (Lay dean)
- 1620–1638 Richard Hunt
- 1639–1645 Walter Balcanquhall
- 1646 Christopher Potter
- 1646–1659 William Fuller
- 1660–1661 John Barwick
- 1661–1684 John Sudbury
- 1684–1690 Denis Granville
- 1691–1699 Thomas Comber
- 1700–1728 John Montague
- 1728–1746 Henry Bland
- 1746–1774 The Hon Spencer Cowper
- 1774–1777 Thomas Dampier
- 1777–1788 William Digby
- 1788–1794 John Hinchliffe

=== Late modern ===
- 1794–1824 The Hon James Cornwallis (The Earl Cornwallis from 1823)
- 1824–1827 Charles Hall
- 1827–1840 John Jenkinson
- 1840–1869 George Waddington (also Warden of the University from 1862)
- 1869–1894 William Lake (also Warden of the University)
- 1894–1912 George Kitchin (also Warden of the University until 1909)
- 1912–1918 Hensley Henson
- 1918–1933 James Welldon
- 1933–1951 Cyril Alington
- 1951–1974 John Wild
- 1974–1979 Eric Heaton
- 1980–1988 Peter Baelz
- 1989–2002 John Arnold
- 2003–2015 Michael Sadgrove
- 2016–2022 Andrew Tremlett
- 2023–present Philip Plyming

== Sources ==
- British History – Fasti Ecclesiae Anglicanae 1541–1857, Vol. 11 – Deans of Durham
