= Dean of St Paul's =

Leader within the Church of England

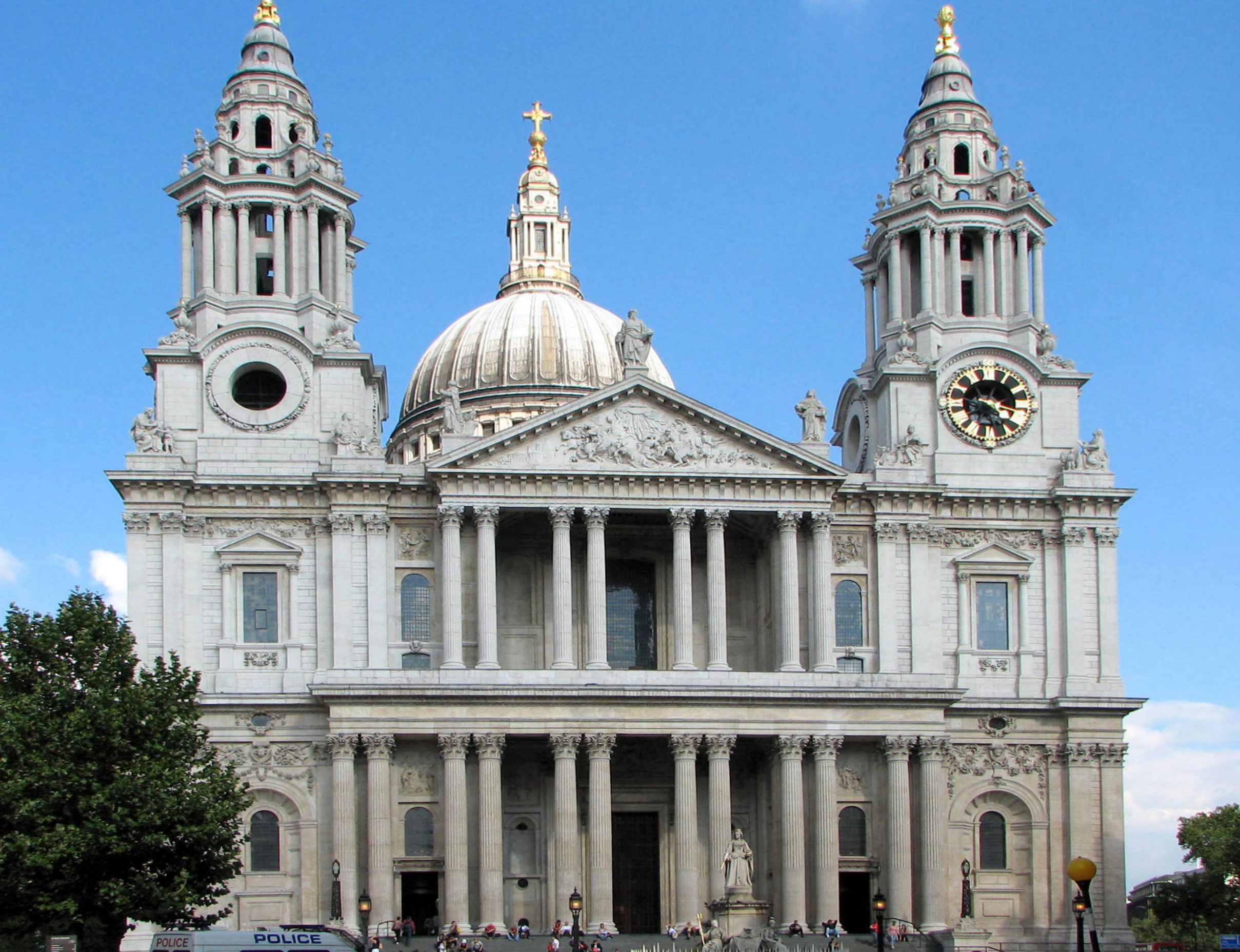
St Paul's Cathedral, London

The dean of St Paul's is dean (head) of the chapter of St Paul's Cathedral, the cathedral church of the diocese of London in the Church of England. Since 1957, the dean of St Paul's is also ex officio the Dean of the Order of the British Empire.

The current dean is Andrew Tremlett, who was installed on 25 September 2022.

== Deanery ==
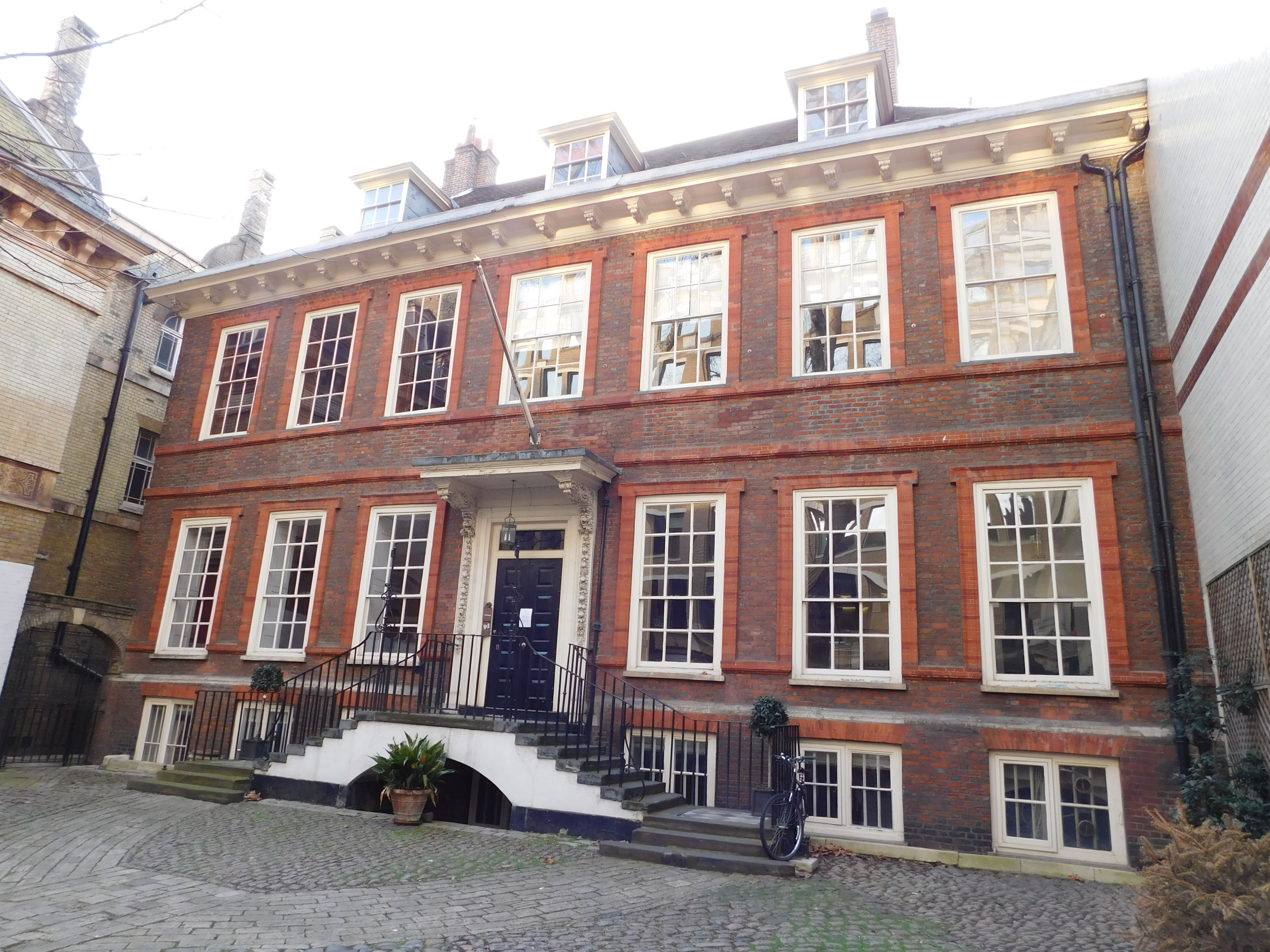
The Old Deanery, Dean's Court, London

From 1673 until 1977, the dean lived in the Deanery House, a townhouse on Dean's Court beside the cathedral, which is now called the Old Deanery and owned by the diocese of London. It was let as offices until 1992, but since 1996 has been used by the diocese and includes a residence for the bishop of London.

== List of deans ==
=== High Medieval ===
- 1090–1107 Wulman
- 1107–1111 Ranulf Flambard (disputed)
- 1111–1138 William de Mareni
- 1138–1157 Ralph de Langford
- 1158–1180 Hugh de Mareni
- 1180–1199 Ralph de Diceto
- 1200–1216 Alard de Burnham
- 1216–1218 Gervase de Howbridge
- 1218–1227 Robert de Watford
- 1228–1231 Martin de Pattishall
- 1231–1241 Geoffrey de Lucy
- 1241–1243 William of Sainte-Mère-Eglise
- 1243–1253 Henry de Cornhill
- 1253–1257 Walter de Saleron
- 1257–1260 Robert de Barton
- 1260–1261 Peter de Newport
- January 1262–July 1262 Richard Talbot
- July 1262 – 1263 John de Ebulo
- 1263–1267 Geoffrey de Fering
- 1268–1273 John Chishull
- 1273–1276 Hervey de Boreham
- 1276–1283 Thomas Ingoldsthorpe
- 1283–1285 Roger de La Legh
- 1285–1294 William de Montfort
- 1294–1306 Ralph Baldock

=== Late Medieval ===
- 1306–1313 Arnald Frangerius de Cantilupo
- 1314–1316 John Sandale
- 1316–1317 Richard Newport
- 1317 Roger de Northburgh
- 1317–1322 Vitalis de Testa
- 1322–1335 John de Everdon
- 1335–1354 Gilbert de Bruera
- 1354–1361 Richard de Kilvington
- 1361–1362 Walter de Alderbury
- 1362–1364 Thomas Trilleck
- 1364–1389 John de Appleby
- 1389–1400 Thomas de Eure
- 1400–1405 Thomas Stowe
- 1406–1421 Thomas More
- 1422–1441 Reginald Kentwood
- 1441–1456 Thomas Lisieux
- 1456–1457 Laurence Booth
- 1457–1468 William Say
- 1468–1471 Roger Radclyffe
- 1471–1478 Thomas Wynterbourne
- 1479–1499 William Worsley

=== Early modern ===
- 1499–1505 Robert Sherborne
- 1505–1519 John Colet
- 1519–1536 Richard Pace
- 1536–1540 Richard Sampson
- 1540–1545 John Incent
- 1545–1554 William May
- 1554–1556 John Feckenham
- 1556–1559 Henry Cole
- 1559–1560 William May (again)

=== Post-Reformation ===
Name	Portrait	Term of office	
Alexander Nowell		1560	1602^{[†]}
John Overall		1602	1614
Valentine Cary		1614	1621
John Donne		1621	1631^{[†]}
Thomas Winniffe		1631	1642
Richard Steward (not installed)		1642	1651^{[†]}
Vacancy (English Interregnum)		1651	1660
Matthew Nicholas		1660	1661^{[†]}
John Barwick		1661	1664^{[†]}
William Sancroft		1664	1678
Edward Stillingfleet		1678	1689
John Tillotson		1689	1691
William Sherlock		1691	1707^{[†]}
Henry Godolphin		1707	1726
Francis Hare (in commendam as Bishop of St Asaph 1727–31, as Bishop of Chichester from 1731)		1726	1740^{[†]}
Joseph Butler (in commendam as Bishop of Bristol)		1740	1750
Thomas Secker (in commendam as Bishop of Oxford)		1750	1758
John Hume (in commendam as Bishop of Oxford)		1758	1766
Frederick Cornwallis (in commendam as Bishop of Lichfield)		1766	1768
Thomas Newton (in commendam as Bishop of Bristol)		1768	1782^{[†]}
Thomas Thurlow (in commendam as Bishop of Lincoln)		1782	1787
George Pretyman Tomline (Pretyman until 1803) (in commendam as Bishop of Lincoln)		1787	1820
William Van Mildert (in commendam as Bishop of Llandaff)		1820	1826
Charles Sumner (in commendam as Bishop of Llandaff)		1826	1827
Edward Copleston (in commendam as Bishop of Llandaff)		1827	1849^{[†]}
Henry Hart Milman		1849	1868^{[†]}
Henry Longueville Mansel		1868	1871^{[†]}
Richard William Church		1871	1890^{[†]}
Robert Gregory		1891	1911^{[†]}
William Ralph Inge		1911	1934
Walter Matthews		1934	1967
Martin Sullivan		1967	1978
Alan Webster		1978	1988
Eric Evans		1988	1996^{[†]}
John Moses		1996	2006
Graeme Knowles		2007	2011
David Ison		2012	2022
Andrew Tremlett		2022	incumbent

== See also ==
- Dean and Chapter of St Paul's

== Notes ==
- ^{†} Died in office

== Sources ==
- Deans of St Paul's. Greenway, D. E. (1968). Fasti Ecclesiae Anglicanae 1066–1300. Volume 1: St. Paul's, London. British History Online. pp. 4–8.
- Deans of St Paul's. Horn, J. M. (1963). Fasti Ecclesiae Anglicanae 1300–1541. Volume 5: St Paul's, London. British History Online. pp. 4–7.
- Deans of St Paul's. Horn, J. M. (1969). Fasti Ecclesiae Anglicanae 1541–1857. Volume 1: St. Paul's, London. British History Online. pp. 5–7.
- WR Matthews: Date accessed: 15 February 2006.
- St Paul's Cathedral press release 23 Jan 2006: Date accessed: 15 February 2006.
