= John C. Knapp =

American academic

John Knapp
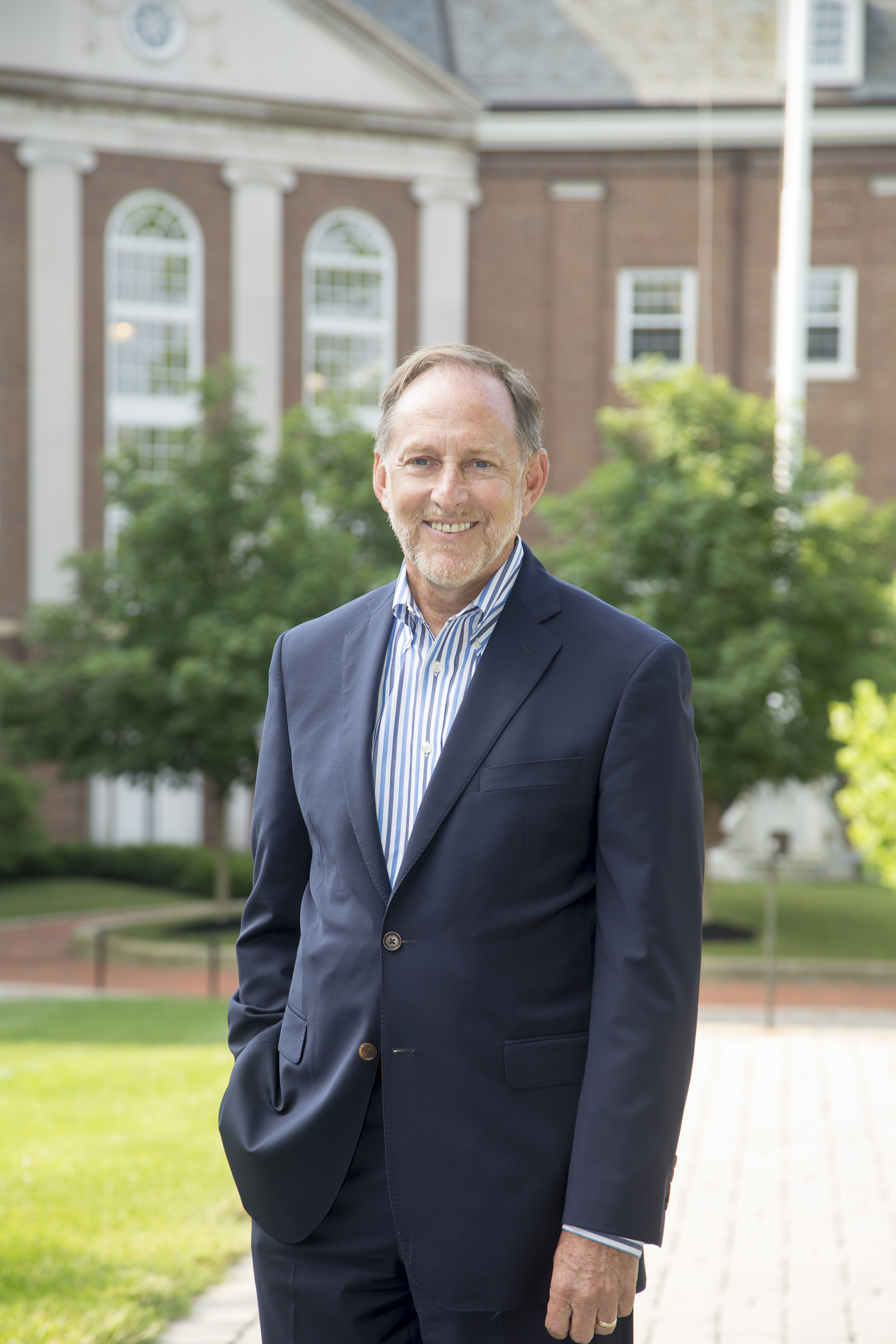

13th President of Washington & Jefferson College
- In office August 1, 2017 – June 30, 2024
- Preceded by: Tori Haring-Smith
- Succeeded by: Elizabeth MacLeod Walls

12th President of Hope College
- In office July 1, 2013 – August 1, 2017
- Preceded by: James E. Bultman
- Succeeded by: Dennis N. Voskuil

Personal details
- Born: May 13, 1959 (age 66) Decatur, GA
- Spouse: Kelly Knapp
- Children: 5
- Education: Georgia State University (BS); Columbia Theological Seminary (MA); University of Wales (PhD)
- Website: http://www.knappleadership.com

John C. Knapp (born May 13, 1959) is a leadership consultant and former American academic administrator who served as the 13th president of Washington & Jefferson College in Washington, Pennsylvania. Previously, he was the 12th president of Hope College, a private Christian liberal arts college located in Holland, Michigan.

== Education ==
In 1981, Knapp earned a Bachelor of Science degree in urban life with a concentration in communication from Georgia State University. Following his bachelor's degree, he completed his Master of Arts degree in theological studies at Columbia Theological Seminary in 1995. In 1999, Knapp earned the Doctor of Philosophy degree in theology and religious studies at the University of Wales, where his dissertation, “Self-Deception and Moral Blindness in The Modern Corporation,” was supervised by Peter Baelz. At the time, Knapp was an Honorary Visiting Lecturer at the university. He was awarded the honorary Doctor of Letters (D.Litt.) degree by Hope College in 2013.

== Career ==
=== Leadership consulting ===
Following his career in the academic presidency, Knapp returned to his earlier work as a consultant.

=== Research and writing ===
Knapp has published five books titled For the Common Good: The Ethics of Leadership in the 21st Century (Praeger, 2006); Leaders on Ethics: Real-World Perspectives on Today's Business Challenges (Praeger, 2007); The Business of Higher Education (ABC-CLIO, 2009), three volumes focusing on how universities cope with pressure to strengthen accountability and efficiency; and How the Church Fails Businesspeople (and What Can Be Done About It) (William B. Eerdmans Publishing Company, 2011), which provides insight regarding the relationship between faith and work. His latest book is Ghostwriting and The Ethics of Authenticity (Palgrave Macmillan, 2016), an exploration of the ethics, history and practice of ghostwriting in a wide range of practical contexts.

=== Academic career ===
Knapp served as founding director of Samford University’s Frances Marlin Mann Center for Ethics and Leadership. While there, he held the Mann Family Professorship in Ethics and Leadership. Prior to his tenure at Samford, Dr. Knapp taught at Georgia State University as a Professor and served as founding Director of the Center for Ethics and Corporate Responsibility at the J. Mack Robinson College of Business, as well as its predecessor The Southern Institute for Business & Professional Ethics. He was inducted into Omicron Delta Kappa at Samford in 2010.

Knapp previously taught courses in the doctoral program at Columbia Theological Seminary and was a Senior Scholar and Professor of Ethical Leadership at Kennesaw State University. He is a fellow of Caux Round Table and has served on the boards of organizations including Council for Independent Colleges, American Association of Presidents of Independent Colleges and Universities, Presidents Athletic Conference, Pennsylvania Consortium for the Liberal Arts, Robert J. Rutland Institute for Ethics at Clemson University, Great Lakes Colleges Association, Michigan Intercollegiate Athletic Association, Van Andel Institute, Georgia Humanities Council, Alabama Humanities Foundation, Atlanta Convention and Visitors Bureau, Public Relations Society of America (Georgia Chapter), and Society for Human Resource Management, (Atlanta). In 2018 and 2019, he chaired The New York Times Presidents Council, a representative group of leaders of independent colleges that met annually with editors and reporters to discuss current issues in higher education.

Knapp is co-founder and director of the Oxford Conclave on Global Higher Education, a retreat for college and university presidents held annually since 2004 at the University of Oxford. In 2022, the University of Wales Trinity St. David's bicentenary celebration featured him among 200 outstanding graduates and institutional leaders of the university's first 200 years. He was recognized with the 2001 Georgia Governor's Award in the Humanities, the 2013 Birmingham Urban League Multi-Racial Friendship Award, and induction into the Martin Luther King Jr. International Collegium of Scholars at Morehouse College.

Knapp was appointed president of Hope College on July 1, 2013. In addition to his presidential appointment, Knapp was also a professor of Religion and Professor of Management. On April 21, 2017, Knapp was announced as the 13th President of Washington & Jefferson College in Washington, Pennsylvania, where he also held an appointment as Professor in the Department of Philosophy. He officially began his duties on August 1, 2017.

It was announced in 2023 that Knapp would be retiring on June 30, 2024. On February 27, 2024, the college announced that Elizabeth MacLeod Walls would succeed him as president.

=== Earlier career ===
Earlier, he founded and led Knapp Inc., an Atlanta-based consulting firm providing advisory services in corporate communication, crisis management and organizational ethics to a diverse clientele of Fortune 500 companies, medical providers, universities, financial institutions and professional associations. In 1993, he was named one of the "10 Outstanding Young People of Atlanta" and in 1992 Business Atlanta (now Georgia Trend) recognized him as one of the region's "40 Under 40" young business leaders. In annual surveys by Atlanta Business Chronicle in 1991 and 1992, he was named the region's best crisis management consultant.
