= John Arnold (priest) =

British priest and writer

The Very Reverend John Arnold OBE
- Dean of Durham
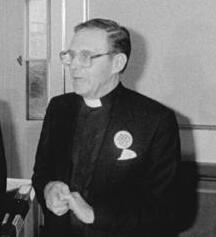
- Arnold in 1987
- Church: Church of England
- Diocese: Diocese of Durham
- In office: 1989 to 2002
- Predecessor: Peter Baelz
- Successor: Michael Sadgrove
- Other post: Dean of Rochester (1978–1989)

Orders
- Ordination: 1960

Personal details
- Born: John Robert Arnold; 1 November 1933 (age 93)
- Denomination: Anglicanism
- Education: Christ's Hospital; Sidney Sussex College, Cambridge

John Robert Arnold, OBE (born 1 November 1933) is a retired Anglican priest and author. He served as Dean of Rochester from 1978 to 1989, and then as Dean of Durham from 1989 until his retirement in 2002.

== Biography ==
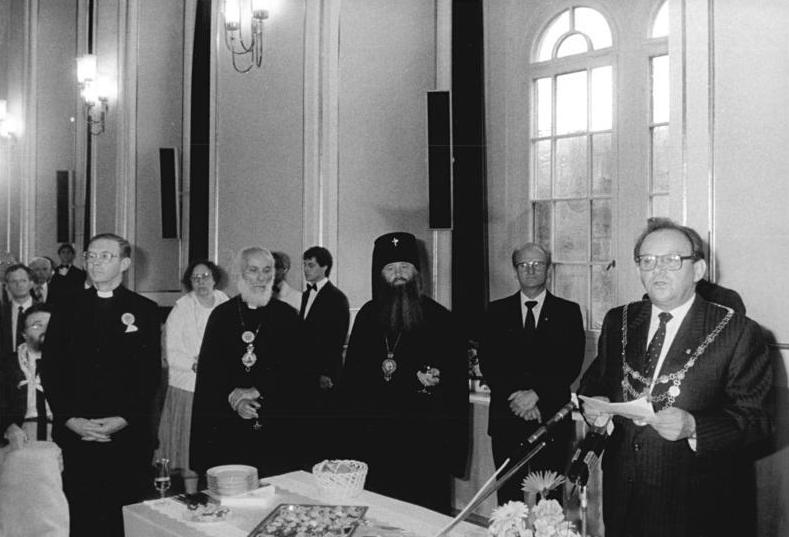
Arnold (left) with other Christian leaders at the regional Kirchentag in East Berlin,

Arnold was educated at Christ's Hospital and Sidney Sussex College, Cambridge.

He was ordained in 1960 and was then a curate at Holy Trinity, Millhouses, Sheffield then chaplain and lecturer at the University of Southampton. From 1972 to 1978 he was secretary of the Board for Mission and Unity for the General Synod of the Church of England when he became Dean of Rochester. In 1989 he became Dean of Durham, a position he held until his retirement in 2002.

He was a noted ecumenicist. He served as vice-president (1986-1992) and president (1992-1997) of the Conference of European Churches. His papers are held at the archive of the Cambridge Centre For Christianity World Wide. In the 2012 Queen's Birthday Honours, he was appointed an Officer of the Order of the British Empire (OBE) "for services to the European Ecumenical Movement".

== Selected works ==
- Eucharistic Liturgy of Taizé (1962)
- Strategist for the Spirit (1985)
- Rochester Cathedral (1987)
- Preaching from Cathedrals (1998)
- Life Conquers Death (2007)

Church of England titles
Preceded by Stanley Woodley Betts	Dean of Rochester; 1978 –1989	Succeeded by Edward Frank Shotter
Preceded by Peter Richard Baelz	Dean of Durham; 1989 –2002	Succeeded by Michael Sadgrove
