= John Sudbury =

17th century English clergyman

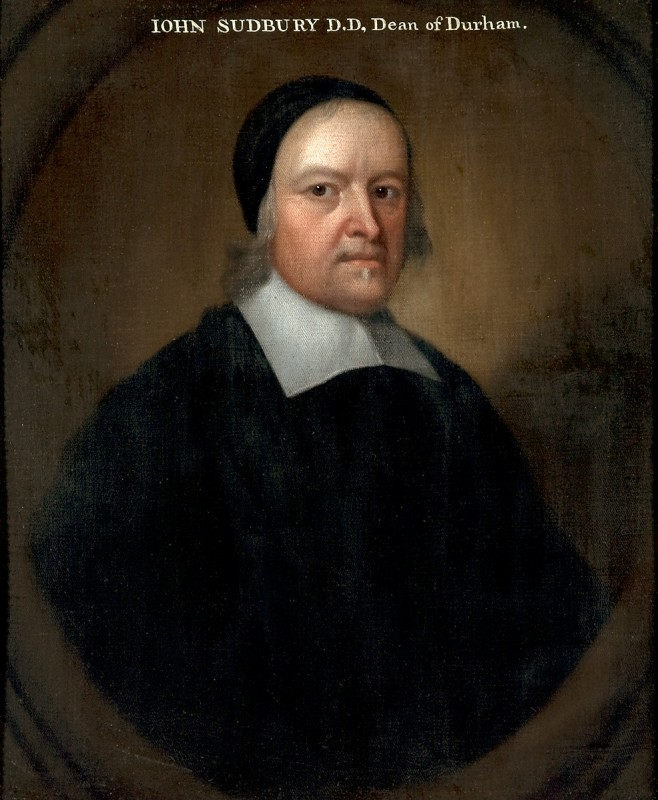
John Sudbury

John Sudbury was Dean of Durham from his installation on 15 February 1661 until his death on 29 November 1684. He was born at Bury St Edmunds in 1604, educated at Emmanuel College, Cambridge and ordained in 1629. He was Vicar of Leigh, Kent from 1639 to 1642 and a Prebendary of Westminster from 1660 to 1661.

Church of England titles
Preceded by John Barwick	Dean of Durham; 1662–1684	Succeeded by Denis Granville
