= Peter Baelz =

Anglican priest and theologian

Peter Richard Baelz (1923–2000) was an Anglican priest and theologian.

Born on 27 July 1923, he was educated at Dulwich College and Cambridge University, where he won a tennis blue. He trained for ordination at Westcott House, Cambridge, and was ordained in 1950 and began his career with curacies in Bournville and Sherborne. After this he held incumbencies at Wishaw, Warwickshire and Bournville, Birmingham. From 1960 to 1972 he was Fellow and Dean of Jesus College, Cambridge and a lecturer in Divinity. From 1972 to 1980, he was Regius Professor of Moral and Pastoral Theology at the University of Oxford and finally Dean of Durham from 1980 until 1988. An eminent author, he died on 15 March 2000. The last Ph.D. candidate he supervised was John C. Knapp.

== Notes ==
Church of England titles
Preceded by Eric Heaton	Dean of Durham; 1980–1988	Succeeded by John Arnold
