= Andrew Tremlett =

British Church of England priest

The Very Reverend Andrew Tremlett
- Dean of St Paul's
- Diocese: Diocese of London
- In office: 25 September 2022 – present
- Predecessor: David Ison
- Other posts: Canon residentiary of Bristol Cathedral (2008–2010; Canon residentiary of Westminster Abbey (2010–2016; various roles, see text); Dean of Durham (2016–2022)

Orders
- Ordination: 1989 (deacon); 1990 (priest)

Personal details
- Born: 9 March 1964 (age 62)
- Denomination: Anglican
- Spouse: Maggi Dawn
- Children: 3
- Education: Plymouth College
- Alma mater: Pembroke College, Cambridge; Wycliffe Hall, Oxford; The Queen's College, Oxford; University of Exeter; University of Liverpool

Andrew Tremlett (born 9 March 1964) is a British Church of England priest. Since 2022, he has served as Dean of St Paul's, and is therefore the head of the Chapter of St Paul's Cathedral and the most senior priest in the Diocese of London. Previously, he was a canon residentiary of Bristol Cathedral (2008–2010), a canon residentiary of Westminster Abbey (2010–2016) and Dean of Durham (2016–2022).

== Early life and education ==
Tremlett was born on 9 March 1964. His father is Anthony Tremlett, who was a Church of England priest and former archdeacon. From 1975 to 1982, he was educated at Plymouth College, a private school in Plymouth, Devon. He then matriculated into Pembroke College, Cambridge to study classics. He graduated from the University of Cambridge with a Bachelor of Arts (BA) degree in 1986; as per tradition, his BA was promoted to a Cambridge Master of Arts (MA Cantab) degree in 1990.

In 1986, Tremlett began training for ordination at Wycliffe Hall, Oxford, a theological college in the Evangelical Anglicanism tradition. During this time, he also studied theology at The Queen's College, Oxford, and graduated from the University of Oxford with a BA degree in 1988; as per tradition, his BA was promoted to an MA (Oxon) in 1995. He was awarded the Pusey and Ellerton Senior Prize which is awarded to "candidates whose performance in Biblical Hebrew the examiners judge to be of sufficient merit".

During his ordained ministry, Tremlett has continued to study. In 1996, he graduated from the University of Exeter with a Master of Philosophy (MPhil) degree. He studied patristics, and his thesis was titled "Metaphors of Salvation in the Soteriology of Origen of Alexandria". In 2003, he completed a Postgraduate Certificate in Church School Education (PGCE) at the University of Liverpool.

== Ordained ministry ==
Tremlett was ordained in the Church of England as a deacon in 1989 and as a priest in 1990. From 1989 to 1992, he served his curacy in the Parish of St Matthias, St Mark and Holy Trinity, Torquay, Diocese of Exeter. From 1992 to 1995, he was based in the Diocese of Europe. He served as chaplain to the Mission to Seafarers and as assistant Chaplain of St Mary's Anglican and Episcopal Church in Rotterdam, Netherlands, from 1992 to 1994. He was then chaplain (i.e. priest-in-charge) of St Mary's from 1994 to 1995.

In 1995, Tremlett returned to England. From 1995 to 1998, he was team vicar of the Parish of Holy Trinity with St Columba, Fareham, in the Diocese of Portsmouth. From 1998 to 2003, he served as bishop's chaplain to Kenneth Stevenson, the Bishop of Portsmouth. During this time he also worked with the Doctrine Commission of the Church of England as a parliamentary research assistant and secretary. He then moved to the Diocese of Chichester, where he was vicar of St Mary's Church, Goring-by-Sea, Worthing, from 2003 to 2008.

In 2008, Tremlett moved to the Diocese of Bristol. He had been appointed a canon residentiary of Bristol Cathedral and the Keeper of the Fabric; as such, he was responsible for the cathedral's development plan. From June 2009 to May 2010, he served as the acting Dean of Bristol during the interregnum.

In July 2010, it was announced that Tremlett was to be made a Canon of Westminster and Rector of St Margaret's Church, Westminster. There was controversy surrounding the appointment. The rector of St Margaret's had also been the Chaplain to the Speaker of the House of Commons for the previous 40 years. However, John Bercow blocked the appointment of Tremlett having described him as "another white middle aged man", and instead appointed Rose Hudson-Wilkin as chaplain. In October 2010, he was installed as a canon at Westminster Abbey. In June 2014, he was additionally appointed the Archdeacon of Westminster and the sub-dean of Westminster Abbey.

=== Dean ===
On 17 December 2015, Tremlett was announced as the next Dean of Durham. Though the previous dean, Michael Sadgrove, retired on 31 December 2015, Tremlett was to be installed as dean in the summer of 2016. On 17 July 2016, he was installed as dean in a service at Durham Cathedral. He has also been rector of St Chad's College, Durham, from 2017.

On 30 March 2022, it was announced that Tremlett is to become the next Dean of St Paul's following the retirement of David Ison, which was scheduled for September 2022. Tremlett was formally appointed on 21 September 2022, and installed on 25 September 2022.

== Personal life ==
Tremlett married Ali, a teacher, in 1988 and has three children; they separated in 2016 and divorced in 2021. He married Maggi Dawn in April 2022.

Tremlett had a cat called Badger which became well known among the students of Durham University and residents living in the city. Badger had over 3,000 followers on Twitter. Announcing the news of Badger's death, Tremlett said: "Very sadly, after a short illness, he has found his place in the sun."

Church of England titles
Preceded by Michael Sadgrove	Dean of Durham; 2016–2022	Succeeded by Philip Plyming
Preceded by David Ison	Dean of St Paul's; 2022–present	Incumbent
