= Philip Plyming =

British Anglican priest (born 1974)

The Very Reverend Dr Philip Plyming
- Dean of Durham
- Diocese: Durham
- In office: 2023 to present
- Previous posts: Warden of Cranmer Hall, Durham (2017–2023); Vicar of Holy Trinity Church, Claygate (2006–2017)

Orders
- Ordination: 2001 (deacon); 2002 (priest)

Personal details
- Born: Philip James John Plyming; 1974 (age 51–52)
- Denomination: Anglicanism
- Education: Robinson College, Cambridge; Cranmer Hall, Durham; St John's College, Durham; University of Edinburgh

Philip James John Plyming (born 1974) is a British Anglican priest. Since 2023, he has been Dean of Durham. From May 2017, he was Warden of Cranmer Hall, Durham, an open evangelical Church of England theological college; and previously, from 2006 to 2017, he was the Vicar of Holy Trinity Church, Claygate in the Diocese of Guildford.

== Early life and education ==
Plyming was born in 1974. As a child, he attended an Anglo-Catholic church but "came to a personal faith in Christ" while he was at university. He studied German and Russian at Robinson College, Cambridge, graduating with a Bachelor of Arts (BA) degree in 1996. He then worked as a linguist. In 1998, he entered Cranmer Hall, Durham, an Open Evangelical Anglican theological college, to train for ordained ministry. During this time, he also studied theology at St John's College, Durham, graduating with a first class BA degree in 2000.

Plyming later undertook postgraduate research at the University of Edinburgh, and he completed his Doctor of Philosophy (PhD) degree in 2008. His doctoral thesis was titled "Transforming news: a theoretical and critical analysis of contemporary Christian news handling in the light of the Apostle Paul's Corinthian hardship narratives".

== Ordained ministry ==
Plyming was ordained in the Church of England as a deacon in 2001 and as a priest in 2002. From 2001 to 2006, he served his curacy at Christ Church, Chineham, Hampshire in the Diocese of Winchester; this is a conservative evangelical church that is ecumenical in nature (associated with Baptists, Methodists, and United Reformed Church, in addition to the Church of England). In 2006, he moved to the Diocese of Guildford where he became Vicar of Holy Trinity Church, Claygate, Surrey. Under his leadership, the attendance saw "significant growth" and it can now be classified as "a very large parish church". In 2012, he was also appointed the Area Dean of Emly.

On 20 December 2016, Plyming was announced as the next Warden of Cranmer Hall, Durham. Cranmer Hall is an Open Evangelical Anglican theological college which forms part of St John's College, Durham, and whose degrees are validated by Durham University. He took up the post on 8 May 2017, after a licensing service at St Oswald's Church, Durham. He teaches New Testament and Christian leadership. He was made an honorary canon od Durham Cathedral in 2022.

Plyming was a member of the General Synod of the Church of England from 2009 to 2017. He served as secretary of the Evangelical Group of the General Synod.

On 16 June 2023, it was announced that Plyming would be the next Dean of Durham, in succession to Andrew Tremlett. He was installed as dean during a service at Durham Cathedral on 16 September 2023.

=== Views ===
Plyming belongs to the Evangelical wing of the Church of England. In August 2016, he signed an open letter that urged the House of Bishops "not to consider any proposals that fly in the face of the historic understanding of the church as expressed in 'Issues in Human Sexuality' (1991) and Lambeth Resolution 1.10".

== Personal life ==
Plyming is married to Annabelle. Together they have two sons.

Academic offices
Preceded by Mark Tanner	Warden of Cranmer Hall, Durham; 2017–2023	Succeeded by Nicholas Moore
Preceded by Andrew Tremlett	Dean of Durham; 2023–present	Incumbent
