= Ivan Neill (priest) =

British Army officer and Anglican priest

The Very Reverend Ivan Neill CB OBE
- Born: Ivan Delacherois Neill; 10 July 1912; County Tipperary, Ireland
- Died: 18 June 2001 (aged 88)
- Military career
- Allegiance: United Kingdom
- Branch: British Army
- Service years: 1939–1966
- Service number: 89720
- Conflicts: World War II: Battle of France

Ivan Delacherois Neill CB OBE (10 July 1912 – 18 June 2001) was an Anglican priest and British Army officer. He served as a military chaplain during World War II and served as Chaplain General from 1960 to 1966 and as Chaplain to the Queen. After leaving the army, he was Provost of Sheffield Cathedral.

== Early life ==
Neill was born on 10 July 1912 at the Templeharry rectory in County Tipperary, Ireland. His father, the Rev. Robert Richard Neill, was a Church of Ireland priest who was later the rector of Tooting Graveney. He spent his early childhood in Cork. He and his family left Ireland for England when the Irish War of Independence broke out.

Having won a scholarship, he was educated at St Dunstan's College, an all-boys private school in London. His parents wanted him to become a missionary doctor so he began the study of medicine at the Medical College of St Bartholomew's Hospital. However, deciding that he was better suited to the priesthood, he left. He went on to study theology at Jesus College, Cambridge, and priestly formation at the London College of Divinity.

== Ordained ministry ==
Neill was ordained at St Paul's Cathedral, London, in 1935. He then served as a curate at St Mary's Church, West Kensington, where his father was the vicar. In 1937, he moved to Christ Church, Crouch End.

In 1939, he joined the Royal Army Chaplains' Department. He was granted a temporary commission into the British Army on 18 April 1939 as a Chaplain to the Forces 4th class (equivalent in rank to captain). He was posted to France with the 3rd Division as part of the British Expeditionary Force. He was evacuated from Dunkirk on HMS Vivacious, a destroyer. During the crossing, he conducted a burial at sea for a soldier who died after they had left France. His commission was confirmed on 1 October 1943. In May 1945, he was a temporary Chaplain to the Forces 3rd class (equivalent to major).

He remained an army chaplain after the war. He served for one year in Germany as Deputy Assistant Chaplain General with the I Corps, British Army of the Rhine. He was promoted to Chaplain to the Forces 3rd class (equivalent to major) on 19 August 1947.

He rose in time to be its Chaplain-General. In 1966 he became Provost of Sheffield, a post he held until 1974.

== Later life ==
Neill served as chairman of the board of governors of Monkton Combe School near Bath, Somerset from 1969 to 1981.

He died on 18 June 2001.

== Honours and decorations ==
In May 1945, he was mentioned in despatches 'in recognition of gallant and distinguished services in North-West Europe'. In May 1947, he was appointed Knight Officer of the Order of Orange-Nassau with swords by the Queen of the Netherlands 'in recognition of distinguished services in the cause of the Allies'.

He was an Honorary Chaplain to the Queen.

Military offices
Preceded by Victor Joseph Pike	Chaplain-General to the Forces; 1960–1966	Succeeded by John Ross Youens
Church of England titles
Preceded by John Howard Cruse	Provost of Sheffield; 1966–1974	Succeeded by Wilfred Frank Curtis
