= Maggi Dawn =

British musician, author and theologian

The Reverend Maggi Dawn
- Born: 1959 (age 66–67)
- Occupations: Priest, musician, author, lecturer
- Spouse: Andrew Tremlett (m. 2022)

Academic background
- Education: Fitzwilliam College, Cambridge; Ridley Hall, Cambridge; Selwyn College, Cambridge
- Thesis: Confessions of an inquiring spirit: a study of the relationship between form and content in the written theology of S. T. Coleridge (2002)

Academic work
- Discipline: Theology
- Sub-discipline: hermeneutics; Christian liturgy
- Institutions: King's College, Cambridge; Robinson College, Cambridge; Faculty of Divinity, University of Cambridge; Yale Divinity School; St Mary's College, Durham; University of Durham

Maggi Eleanor Dawn (born 1959) is a British musician, author, theologian and Anglican priest. She was principal of St Mary's College at the University of Durham, and remains a professor in the Department of Theology and Religion. Previously she was associate professor of theology and literature and associate dean of Marquand Chapel at Yale Divinity School.

== Life and career ==
Dawn's first career was as a singer-songwriter. She has recorded five albums of her own songs, with her album Elements (1996) exploring biblical images of God. She is an advocate for new music in church settings and taught a course, Songwriting for Congregations, which "reject[ed] the idea that contemporary and traditional music are discrete genres".

Dawn took up the study of theology after her career as a singer-songwriter. From 1993 to 1996, she read theology and religious studies at Fitzwilliam College, Cambridge and trained for ordination at Ridley Hall, Cambridge: she graduated with a first class honours Bachelor of Arts (BA) degree and a certificate in theology for ministry (CTM). As per tradition, her BA was later promoted to a Master of Arts (MA Cantab) degree. She later recounted how she was given a leaflet on her first day of theological college that said "A woman's place is not at the altar but in the kitchen; put on an apron and get back to where you belong." From 1996 to 1999, she was a doctoral student in the theology of Samuel Taylor Coleridge at Selwyn College, Cambridge: her PhD was awarded in 2002 for a doctoral thesis titled "Confessions of an inquiring spirit: a study of the relationship between form and content in the written theology of S. T. Coleridge".

Dawn was ordained in the Church of England as a deacon in July 1999 and as a priest in July 2000. She served her curacy in the Diocese of Ely from 1999 to 2001. In 2001, she returned to the University of Cambridge as a chaplain at King's College, Cambridge. Serving under the dean, she organised and led services in King's College Chapel including the Nine Lessons and Carols, provided pastoral support and taught modern theology. In 2003, she moved to Robinson College, Cambridge, where she had been appointed its only chaplain and elected a fellow. In addition to her college work, she was a supervisor and occasional lecturer in the Faculty of Divinity, University of Cambridge.

In 2011, Dawn moved to the United States, where she joined Yale University as associate dean of Yale Divinity School's Marquand Chapel and an associate professor of theology and literature. After eight years, she was not awarded a full professorship and so looked elsewhere. In July 2019, it was announced that she would be the next principal of St Mary's College, Durham. She took up the post in September 2019, and was also made a professor in the University of Durham's Department of Theology and Religion. She has also held permission to officiate in the Diocese of Durham since 2021.

She is the author of five books and numerous articles, on topics including biblical interpretation and the relationship between theology and the arts. Her 2013 book Like the Wideness of the Sea, on arguments for the consecration of women as bishops, was cited in a debate in the UK parliament on the subject. She has been described as a post-evangelical.

Dawn has written articles for The Guardian, The Christian Century, and the Bible Reading Fellowship, and has appeared on BBC religion programs including Prayer for the Day.

== Personal life ==
Dawn married the Dean of Durham, Andrew Tremlett, in April 2022. She was previously married to Andy Cross.

== Bibliography ==
=== Books ===
- Beginnings and Endings: Daily Readings from Advent to Epiphany Oxford: BRF, 2007
- "Giving it up: Daily Bible readings from Ash Wednesday to Easter Day" Oxford: BRF, 2009
- The Writing on the Wall: High Art, Popular Culture and the Bible London: Hodder and Stoughton, 2010
- The Accidental Pilgrim – New Journeys on Ancient Pathways London: Hodder and Stoughton, 2011
- Like the Wideness of the Sea: Women, Bishops and the Church of England London: Darton, Longman and Todd, 2013

=== Articles ===
- "You have to change to stay the same", in Cray, Dawn et al., The Postevangelical Debate SPCK, 1997
- "The Art of Liturgy" in The Rite Stuff: Ritual in Contemporary Christian worship and mission Ed., Peter Ward, Oxford, BRF: 2004
- "I am the truth: text, hermeneutics and the person of Christ" in Anglicanism: The Answer to Modernity? Eds. Dormor, Caddick and MacDonald. New York: Continuum, 2005
- "Whose Text is it anyway? – Limit and freedom in interpretation" in An Acceptable Sacrifice? Homosexuality and the Church Eds., Dormor and Morris, foreword by Archbishop Desmond Tutu. London: SPCK, 2007
- "Reflections for Daily Prayer" 2015–16 (co-authored, ed. Hugh Hillyard-Parker, London: Church House Publishing, 2015

== Discography ==
- Magnificent (Maggi Dawn) [1985]
- No Pretending (Maggi Dawn) [Kingsway Publications, 1987]
- Something in the Atmosphere (Maggi Dawn) [Big Jungle Music, 1990]
- Follow (Maggi Dawn) [Big Jungle Music/Kingsway Publications, 1993]
- Elements (Maggi Dawn) [Big Jungle Music/Kingsway Publications, 1996]
