= Frank Curtis (priest) =

English Anglican priest (1923–2005)

Wilfred Frank Curtis (24 February 1923 – 25 May 2005) was an Anglican priest.

He was born on 24 February 1923 and educated at Foster's School in Sherborne and Bishop Wordsworth's School in Salisbury. After service with the Royal Artillery in the Second World War, he completed his studies at King's College London. He was ordained in 1952 and became curate of High Wycombe. He was with the Church Missionary Society from 1955 to 1974 when he became provost of Sheffield.

He retired in 1988 and died on 25 May 2005.

== See also ==
Church of England titles
Preceded by Ivan Delacherois Neill	Provost of Sheffield; 1974–1988	Succeeded by John Warren Gladwin
