= Durham University Botanic Garden =

Botanical garden in Durham, England

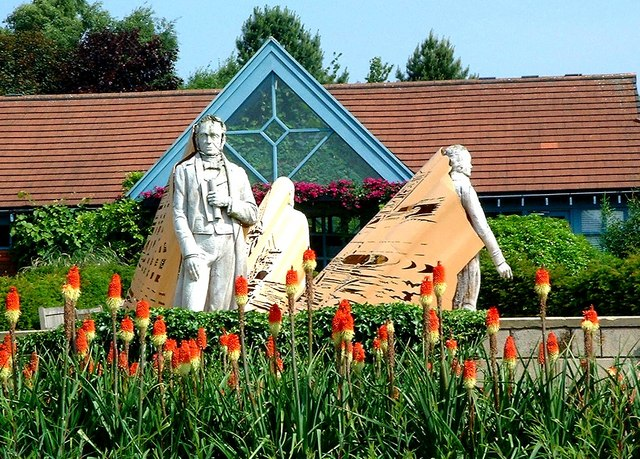
- Interactive map of Durham University Botanic Garden
- Type: Botanic Garden
- Location: Hollingside Lane, Durham, England
- Coordinates: 54°45′38″N 1°34′31″W
- Area: 10 hectares
- Created: 1925 (original location); 1970 (current site)
- Operator: Durham University
- Visitors: 78,000 (2007/08)
- Open: All year
- Website: www.durham.ac.uk/botanic.garden/

Durham University Botanic Garden is the botanical garden of Durham University, located in Durham, England. The site is set in 25 acres (10 ha) of mature woodlands in the southern outskirts of the city. The garden was founded in 1925 and has been located on its present site since 1970; the visitor centre was opened in 1988 by the then Chancellor of Durham University, Dame Margot Fonteyn. The garden attracts over 80,000 visitors annually and has been featured in The Guardian's Country Diary and on Channel 4's Matt Baker: Travels with Mum & Dad. It is the only remaining botanic garden in the northeast of England and has been included in Durham County Council's Local List of Historic Parks, Gardens and Historic Landscapes.

== History ==
The site of the botanic garden was parkland associated with Oswald House, which stood on the site of Collingwood College. By the late 19th century this was formalised, with field boundaries removed and tree clumps introduced, followed by specimen trees. Some of these 19th century specimen trees were later incorporated into the botanic gardens.

The original Durham University Botanic Garden was established in 1925 adjacent to the university's science laboratories, where the university's Bill Bryson Library now stands. Increased pressure on land for buildings on that site led to the garden being relocated to its current site on Hollingside Lane behind Grey College in 1970. It was then part of the university's Botany Department and the gardens included greenhouses used for teaching and research.

A guidebook from the 1970s stated that: "Because the garden is still in its early developmental stage, it is not appropriate to encourage visits from the general public at this time." However, by the late 1980s it was receiving 6,000 visitors annually and a visitor centre was built in 1988 to accommodate these.

The botanic garden was identified as a non-designated heritage asset in the City of Durham Local Plan and this was later confirmed in Durham County Council's Local List of Historic Parks, Gardens and Designed Landscapes. Since the closure of the University of Newcastle's Moorbank Botanic Gardens in 2014, it is the only botanic garden in the northeast of England.

in the 2020s, the botanic garden nursed cuttings of black poplar, Britain's most endangered native tree, some of which were planted by the River Wear at Maiden Castle in 2026.

== Features ==
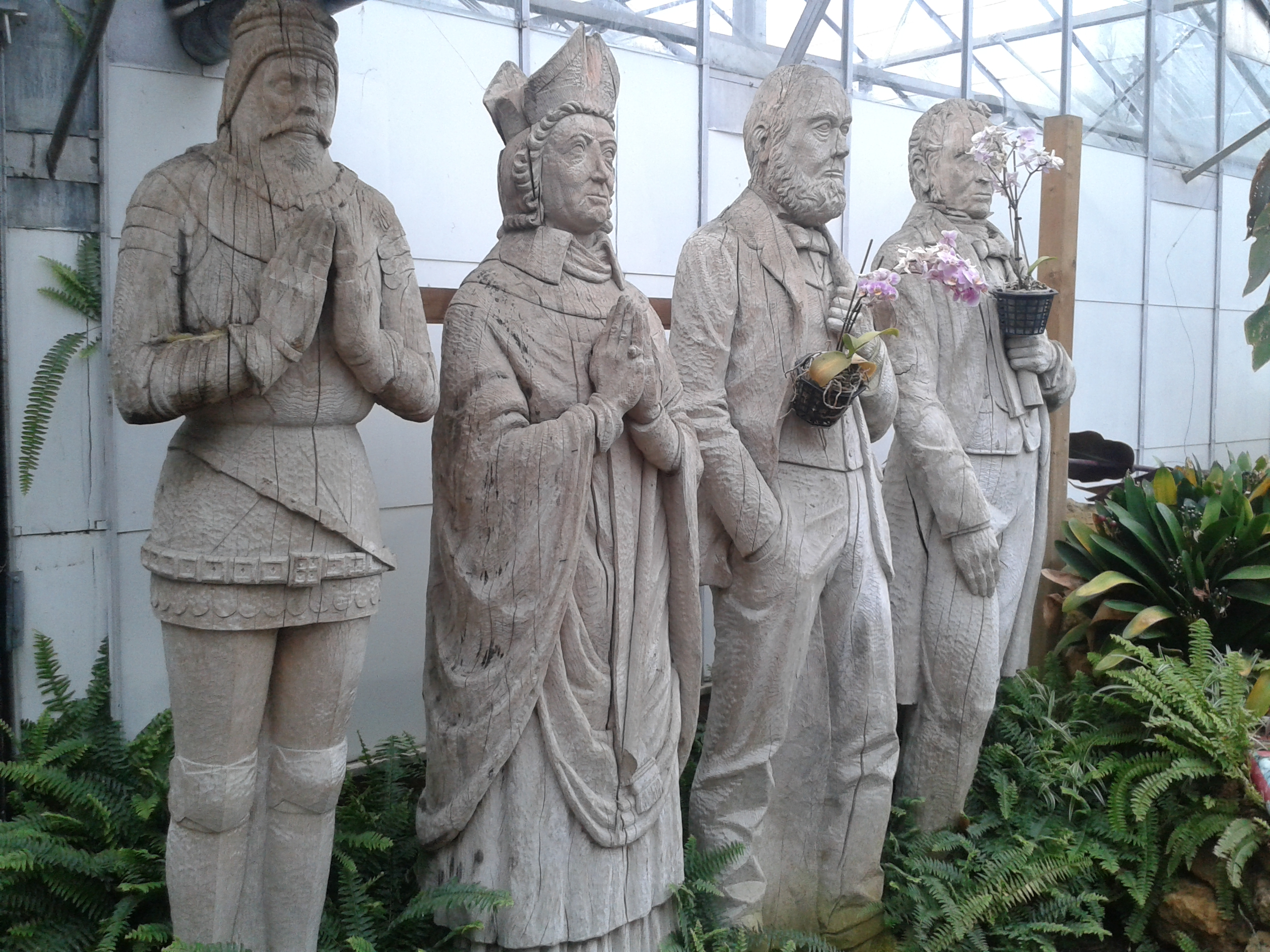
Statues at the botanical garden

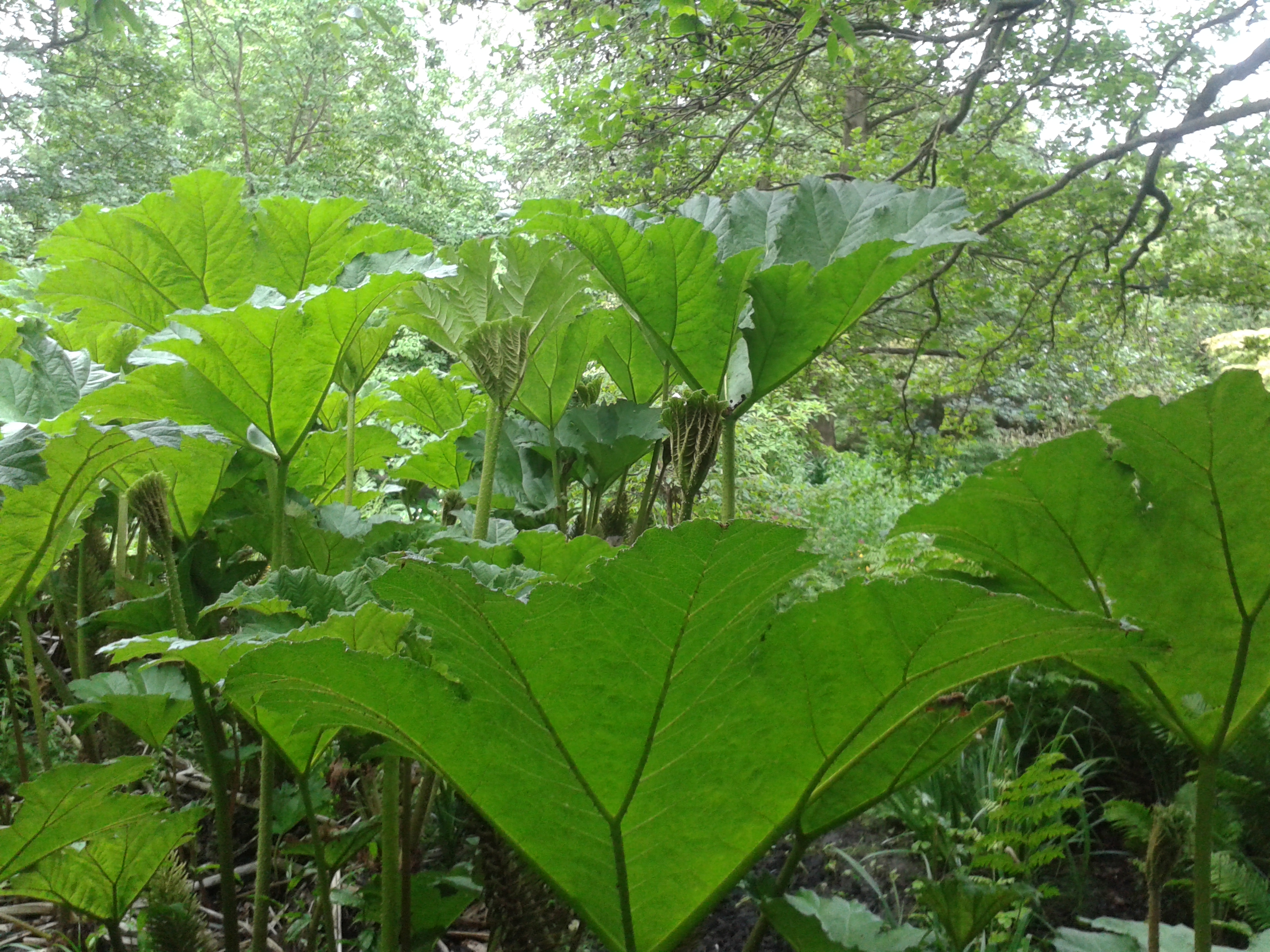
Plants at the botanical garden

The garden has an array of exotic plants with collections ranging from Chile in South America, China and Japan in the Far East, as well as from Southern Africa and New Zealand.

The garden is also home to an arboretum, Alpine garden and bamboo grove. Within the glasshouses tropical rainforest flora, desert plants and species from the Mediterranean are on show as well as tropical insects such as stick insects, scorpions, butterflies and tarantulas.

There are self-guided tours and trails around the garden, including a science trail, a quiz trail and a nature trail aimed at children. The gardens also host a variety of events.
