= Assembly Rooms Theatre, Durham =

Historic theatre

Coordinates: 54.7742°N 1.5749°W

Sir Thomas Allen Assembly Rooms Theatre
- Interactive map of Sir Thomas Allen Assembly Rooms Theatre
- Address: 40 North Bailey; Durham; England
- Owner: Durham University
- Capacity: 175
- Type: Proscenium arch theatre

Construction
- Built: by 1741
- Opened: 1891; 135 years ago (as theatre)

Website
- www.theassemblyroomstheatre.org

The Assembly Rooms Theatre, formally named the Sir Thomas Allen Assembly Rooms Theatre after Sir Thomas Allen, is a historic 175-seat proscenium arch theatre located in the centre of Durham, England, United Kingdom. It is home to 33 Durham Student Theatre companies as well as a local resident company. The theatre is owned by Durham University and managed by the Student Enrichment Directorate, a department of the university.

== History ==
Built in the eighteenth century, with the oldest surviving reference being a newspaper advert from 1741, the Assembly Rooms Theatre originally functioned as a ballroom, before being chosen to be redeveloped as a theatre after Durham's Theatre Royal burnt down in a fire in 1869. Its first dramatic performance, Il Trovatore, was presented in 1891. It was also used as a cinema, with the first projection being made in December 1896 only a month after the first film shown in Durham (at the Court Lane Theatre). It was also the venue for what was probably the first film drama shown in Durham, The Great Train Robbery, in 1903, and by 1912 films had virtually replaced live drama at the theatre.

After their first production of H.M.S. Pinafore in 1909, the theatre continued to be used extensively by Durham Amateur Operatic Group in the early twentieth century, until its acquisition by Durham University in 1930. The university used the theatre as a drill hall until the 1950s, when it was renovated to enable theatrical performances to be hosted once again; one of the earliest performances was a production of Pirates of Penzance by the Durham Colleges Light Opera Group in 1950. From 2007 to 2009 the theatre was refurbished once again, funded by the Gillian Dickinson Trust. This included a complete refurbishment of the auditorium, foyer and box office. This was followed by a further £2.4M refurbishment in 2019, that reduced capacity to 175 but added wheel chair access, a bar and a lift, as well as restoring the ornate ceiling and removing asbestos. The refurbishment won the City of Durham Trust Architectural Award in 2020.

The theatre was renamed the Sir Thomas Allen Assembly Rooms Theatre in 2023, after the baritone singer and former chancellor of Durham University, Sir Thomas Allen.

== Shows ==
The theatre is home to 33 Durham Student Theatre Companies, as well as a local resident Company 'Elysium Theatre Company'.

During term time, The Assembly Rooms Theatre usually hosts at least one production per week These student performances are programmed by the Durham Student Theatre committee, and can feature any of the society's 33 companies. They also host other student societies from the university, such as music ensembles.

The theatre annually participates in and hosts the Durham Drama Festival in February. It is one of the venues for the Durham Fringe festival, held annually in July.

Outside of term time, the theatre sometimes hosts external companies and touring productions.
