= Durham University =

Collegiate university in Durham, England

- Coat of arms
- Latin: Universitas Dunelmensis
- Other name: University of Durham
- Motto: Latin: Fundamenta eius super montibus sanctis
- Motto in English: Her foundations are upon the holy hills (Psalm 87:1)
- Type: Public research university
- Established: 1832; 194 years ago (university status)
- Academic affiliations: ACU; Coimbra Group; EUA; Matariki Network of Universities; N8 Research Partnership; Russell Group; Universities UK; Defence Universities Alliance
- Endowment: £116.3 million (2025; exclusive of independent colleges)
- Budget: £534.1 million (2024/25)
- Chair: Caroline Johnstone
- Visitor: Bishop of Durham or suffragan during vacancy (Rick Simpson)
- Chancellor: Fiona Hill
- Vice-chancellor and warden: Karen O'Brien
- Academic staff: 2,640 (2024/25)
- Administrative staff: 3,180 (2024/25)
- Students: 21,150 (2024/25); 20,650 FTE (2024/25)
- Undergraduates: 16,560 (2024/25)
- Postgraduates: 4,590 (2024/25)
- Location: Durham and Stockton-on-Tees, England; 54°46′30″N 01°34′30″W
- Campus: 257 hectares (640 acres)
- Student newspaper: Palatinate
- Colours: Palatinate
- Sporting affiliations: BUCS, Wallace Group
- Sports team: Team Durham
- Website: durham.ac.uk

UNESCO World Heritage Site
- Official name: Durham Castle and Cathedral
- Type: Cultural
- Criteria: ii, iv, vi
- Designated: 1986 (10th session)
- Reference no.: 370
- Extension: 2008
- Region: Western Europe

The University of Durham, which operates under the trading name of Durham University, is a collegiate public research university in Durham, England, founded by an Act of Parliament in 1832 and incorporated by royal charter in 1837. It was the first recognised university to open in England for more than 600 years, after Oxford and Cambridge, and is thus identified by historians as the third-oldest university in England. As a collegiate university, its main functions are divided between the academic departments of the university and its 17 colleges. In general, the departments perform research and provide teaching to students, while the colleges are responsible for their domestic arrangements and welfare.

The university is a member of the Russell Group of British research universities and is also affiliated with the regional N8 Research Partnership and international university groups including the Matariki Network of Universities and the Coimbra Group. The university estate includes 83 listed buildings, ranging from the 11th-century Durham Castle to the 1960s brutalist students' union. The university also owns and manages the Durham World Heritage Site in partnership with Durham Cathedral. The university's ownership of the world heritage site includes Durham Castle, Palace Green and the surrounding buildings including the historic Cosin's Library.

Durham graduates have long used the Latin post-nominal letters Dunelm after their degree, from Dunelmensis (of, belonging to, or from Durham).

== History ==
=== Origins ===
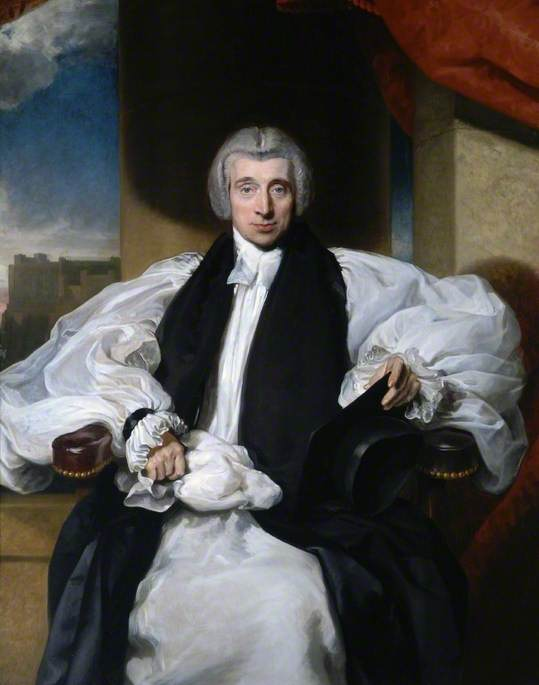
William van Mildert, Bishop of Durham and one of the founders of the university

Between around 1286 and 1291 the Benedictine monks of Durham established a hall at the University of Oxford to provide them with a seat of learning. In 1381, the hall received an endowment from Thomas Hatfield, Bishop of Durham, becoming Durham College. Durham College was surrendered to the Crown in 1545 following the Reformation. The strong tradition of theological teaching in Durham gave rise to various attempts to form a university within the city itself, notably under King Henry VIII and then under Oliver Cromwell, who issued letters patent and nominated a proctor and fellows for the establishment of a college in 1657. However, a proposal to allow the college to confer degrees met with opposition from Oxford and Cambridge universities, and the whole scheme was abandoned at the restoration of the monarchy in 1660. Consequently, it was not until Parliament, at the instigation of Archdeacon Charles Thorp and with the support of the bishop of Durham, William van Mildert, passed the Durham University Act 1832 (2 & 3 Will. 4. c. 19 Pr.), "an Act to enable the Dean and Chapter of Durham Cathedral to appropriate part of the property of their church to the establishment of a University in connection therewith" that the university came into being. The act received royal assent from King William IV on 4 July 1832.

=== The church university, 1832–1909 ===
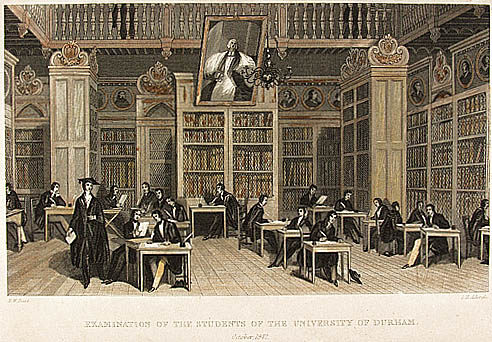
An examination taking place in Cosin's Library, 1842

Durham Castle (gatehouse pictured) houses University College, making it one of the oldest buildings currently being used to house a university in the world

The university opened on 28 October 1833. In 1834, all but two of the bishops of the Church of England confirmed that they would accept holders of Durham degrees for ordination. In 1835, a fundamental statute was passed by the Dean and Chapter, as governors of the university, setting up Convocation and laying down that Durham degrees would only be open to members of the Church of England. Regulations for degrees were finalised in 1836 and the university was incorporated by royal charter granted by William IV on 1 June 1837 as the "Warden, Masters and Scholars of the University of Durham", with the first students graduating a week later. At the opening of the university, accommodation was provided in the Archdeacon's Inn (now Cosin's Hall); in 1837, an order of the Queen-in-Council was issued granting the university use of Durham Castle, which had previously been a palace of the bishop of Durham, for further accommodation.

In 1846, Bishop Hatfield's Hall (later to become Hatfield College) was founded, providing the opportunity for students to obtain affordable lodgings with fully catered communal eating, a revolutionary idea at the time, endorsed by a Royal Commission in 1862 and later spread to other universities, one of the first being the new Keble College Oxford in 1870. Those attending University College were expected to bring a servant with them to deal with cooking, cleaning and so on. The level of applications to Bishop Hatfield's Hall led to a second hall along similar lines, Bishop Cosin's Hall, being founded in 1851, although this only survived until 1864. Elsewhere, the university expanded from Durham into Newcastle in 1852, when the medical school there (established in 1834) became a college of the university. This was joined in 1871 by the College of Physical Sciences (renamed the College of Science in 1884 and again renamed Armstrong College in 1904). St Cuthbert's Society was founded in 1888 for non-collegiate, mostly mature, male students as a non-residential society run by the students themselves. Two teacher-training colleges – St Hild's for women, established in 1858, and The College of the Venerable Bede for men, established in 1839, also existed in the city and these merged to form the mixed College of St Hild and St Bede in 1975. From 1896, these were associated with the university and graduates of St Hild's were the first female graduates from Durham in 1898.

During its expansion phase, the university also became the first English university to establish relationships with overseas institutions: first, in 1875 with Codrington College, Barbados; and, secondly, in early 1876 with Fourah Bay College, Sierra Leone. Under the arrangements, the two colleges became affiliated colleges of the university, with their students sitting examinations for and receiving Durham degrees. The landmark event was not met with universal applause, with the London Times stating that "it would not be much longer before the University of Durham was affiliated to the Zoo". After nearly a century of affiliation and with the prevailing winds of decolonisation, Fourah Bay became independent of the university in 1968, to form part of the University of Sierra Leone, while Codrington College became affiliated to the University of the West Indies in 1965.

The first debating society in Durham was founded in 1835, but may have closed by 1839. The Durham University Union was established in 1842, and revived and moved to Palace Green in 1872–3 as the Durham Union Society. Notable past presidents of the Durham Union have included Richard Dannatt, Sir Edward Leigh, and Crispin Blunt.

The Durham Colleges Students Representative Council (SRC) was founded around 1900 after the model of the College of Medicine SRC (in Newcastle). The Durham University SRC was formed in 1907 with representatives from the Durham Colleges, the College of Medicine, and Armstrong College (also in Newcastle). In 1963, after the creation of Newcastle University, the Durham Colleges SRC became the Durham University SRC, and was renamed as the Durham Students' Union in 1970.

Until the mid-19th century, University of Durham degrees were subject to a religion test and could only be taken by members of the established church. Medical degrees in Newcastle were exempt from this requirement from the start of the affiliation of the medical school, but in Durham it lasted until the revision of the statutes in 1865. Despite the opening of degrees, staff and members of Convocation were still required to be members of the Church of England until the Universities Tests Act 1871. However, "dissenters" were able to attend Durham and then sit the examinations for degrees of the University of London, which were not subject to any religious test. Following the grant of a supplemental charter in 1895 allowing women to receive degrees of the university, the Women's Hostel (St Mary's College from 1919) was founded in 1899.

=== The federal university, 1909–1963 ===
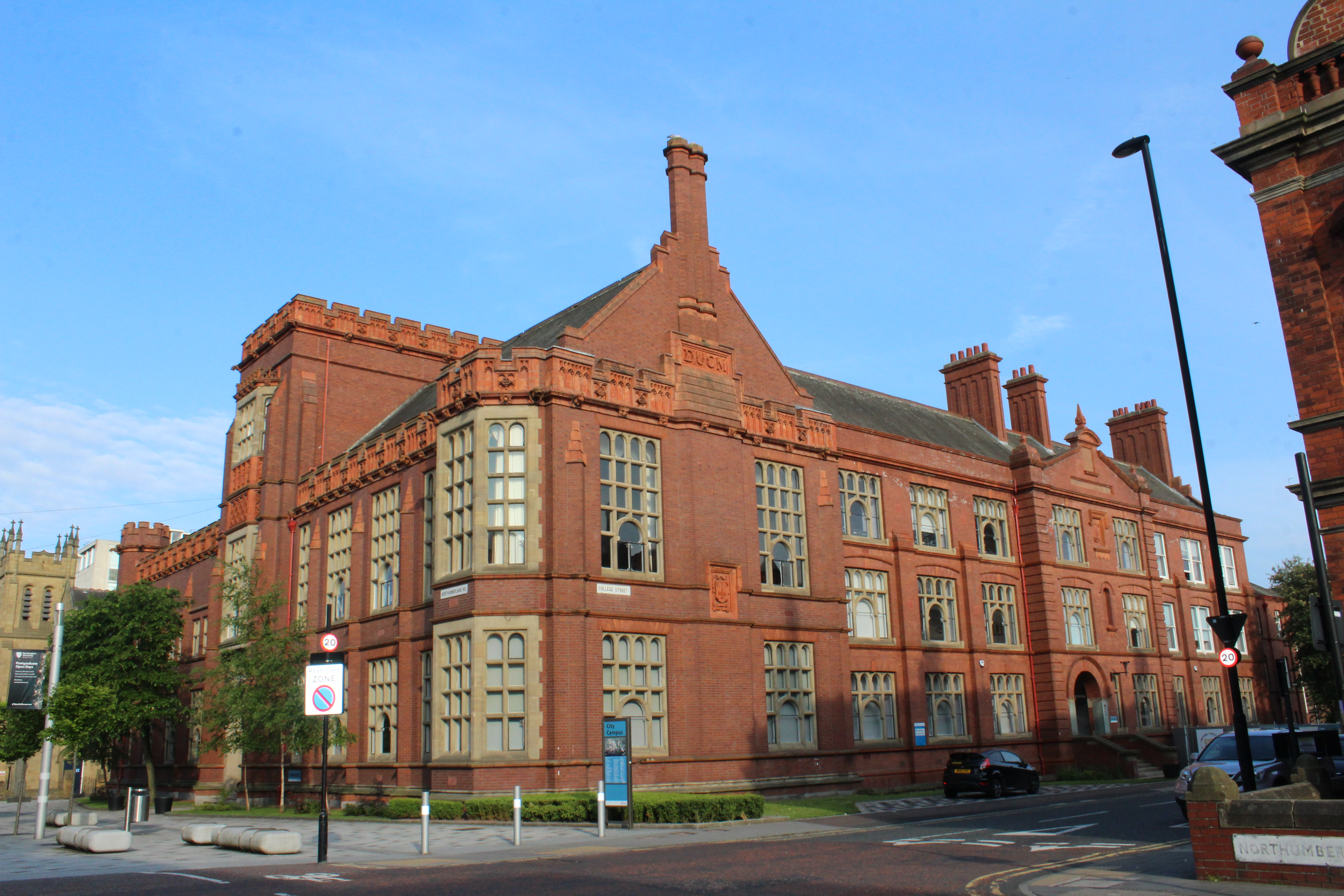
Durham University College of Medicine, Newcastle, now the Sutherland Building of Northumbria University

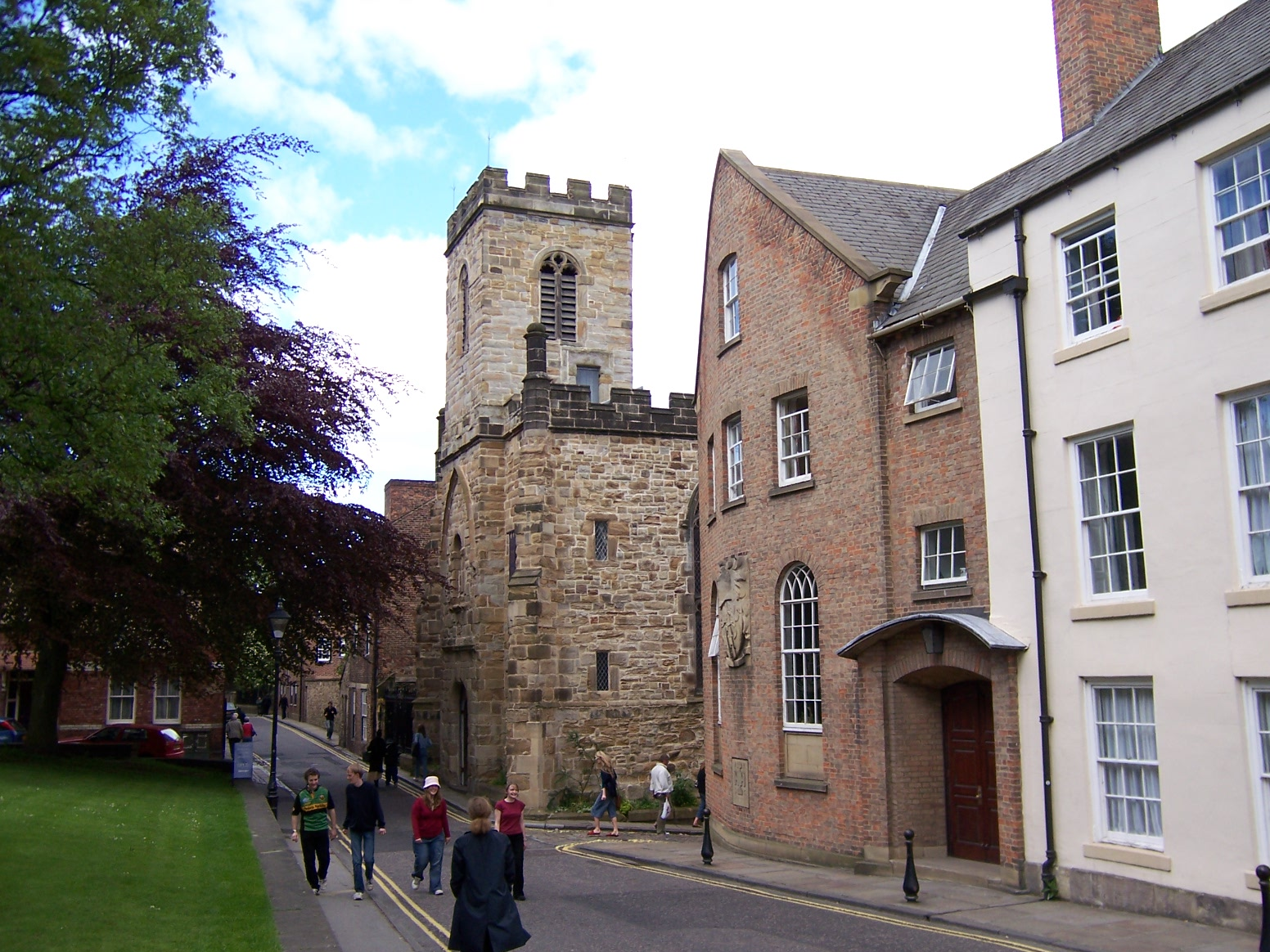
St Chad's College, one of the two independent colleges

The Newcastle division of the university, which comprised both Armstrong College (named after Lord Armstrong) and Durham University College of Medicine, quickly grew to outnumber the Durham colleges, despite the addition of two independent Anglican foundations: St Chad's College (1904) and St John's College (1909). A parliamentary bill proposed in 1907 would have fixed the seat of the university in Durham for only ten years, allowing the Senate to choose to move to Newcastle after this. This was blocked by John Taylor, MP for Chester-le-Street, with the support of graduates of the Durham colleges, until the bill was modified to establish a federal university with its seat fixed in Durham, as well as greater representation for the graduates (including that the chancellor would be appointed by convocation, as remains the case) and the abolition of ad eundem degrees. This reform also removed the university from the authority of the Dean and Chapter of Durham Cathedral, who had been the governors of the university since its foundation. Thirty years after this, the Royal Commission of 1937 recommended changes in the constitution of the federal university, resulting in the merger of the two colleges in the Newcastle Division to form King's College. The vice-chancellorship alternated between the warden of the Durham Division and the rector of the Newcastle Division, the chief academic and administrative officers of the two divisions under the 1937 statutes. The executive head of Durham University continues to use the title of "Vice-Chancellor and Warden".

After World War II, the Durham division expanded rapidly. St Aidan's Society (St Aidan's College from 1961) was founded in 1947 to cater for non-resident women and the decision was made to expand further on Elvet Hill (where the science site had been established in the 1920s), relocating St Mary's College, building new men's colleges, vastly expanding the existing pure science provision in Durham, and adding applied science (1960) and engineering (1965).

In 1947, the foundation stones for the new St Mary's College building on Elvet Hill were laid by Princess Elizabeth (later Queen Elizabeth II). The new building opened in 1952. In the same year, tensions surfaced again over the Durham–Newcastle divide, with the university court putting forward a proposal to change the name of the university to the "University of Durham and Newcastle". This motion was defeated in convocation (the assembly of members of the university) by 135 votes to 129. Eleven years later, with the Universities of Durham and Newcastle upon Tyne Act 1963, King's College became the University of Newcastle upon Tyne, leaving Durham University based solely in its home city.

=== The modern university, 1963–1999 ===
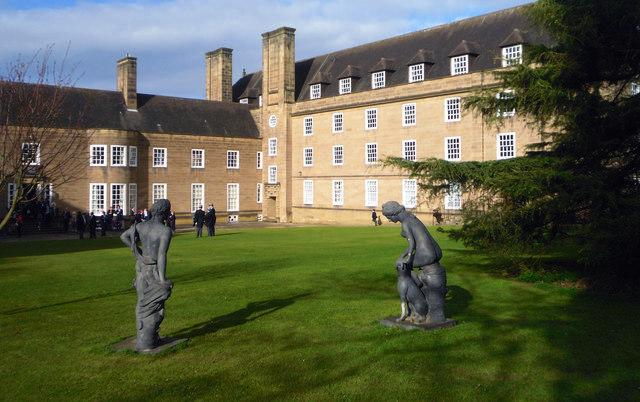
The lawn at St Mary's College, the first of the Hill colleges

By the time of the separation from Newcastle, the Elvet Hill site was well established; with the first of the new colleges being founded in 1959, Grey College, named after the second Earl Grey, who was the prime minister when the university was founded. Expansion up Elvet Hill continued, with Van Mildert College, Trevelyan College (1966), and Collingwood College (1972) all being added to the university, along with the relocation of the botanic garden (1970) and the business school (1977).

These were not the only developments in the university, however. The Graduate Society, catering for postgraduate students, was founded in 1965 (renamed Ustinov College in 2003) and the Roman Catholic seminary of Ushaw College, which had been in Durham since 1808, was licensed as a hall of residence in 1968 (closed 2011). Hatfield, the last men's college, became mixed in 1988, followed by the women's college of Trevelyan in 1992, leaving the original women's college of St Mary's as the last single-sex college.

In 1989, the university opened a fund-raising and alumni office, with a virtual community for alumni.

==== Development in Stockton, 1992–1999 ====
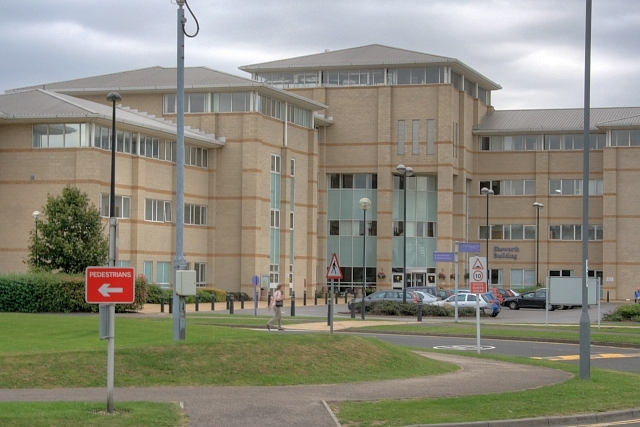
Ebsworth Building, Queen's Campus, Stockton

In 1991, a joint venture between the university and the University of Teesside saw the Joint University College on Teesside of the Universities of Durham and Teesside (JUCOT) established at Thornaby-on-Tees in the borough of Stockton-on-Tees and the ceremonial county of North Yorkshire, 30 miles (48 km) to the south of Durham. It opened under the name of University College Stockton (UCS) in 1992.

UCS was initially intended to grant joint degrees validated by both institutions (BAs and BScs). However, Teesside, which had only become a university in 1992, had difficulties in taking on its responsibilities for the college and withdrew in 1994, Durham taking over full responsibility for UCS and the degrees to be awarded there.

A programme of integration with Durham began, with the Privy Council approving changes in Durham's statutes to make UCS a college of the University of Durham. Further integration of the Stockton development with the university led to the formation of the University of Durham, Stockton Campus (UDSC) in 1998 and the separation of teaching responsibilities from UCS.

=== 21st century university ===
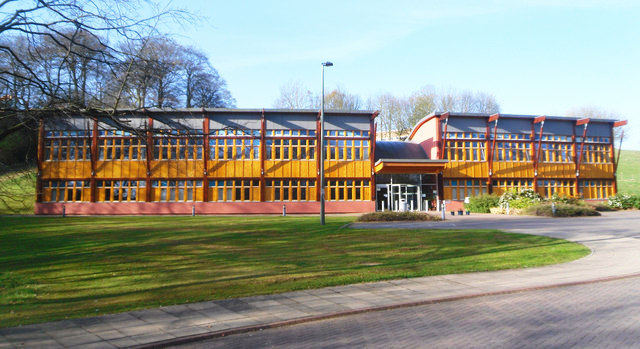
School of Government and International Affairs

In 2001, two new colleges, John Snow and George Stephenson (after the physician and the engineer) were established at Stockton, replacing UCS, and the new medical school (operating in association with the University of Newcastle upon Tyne) accepted its first students. In 2002, her golden jubilee year, the queen granted the title "Queen's Campus" to the Stockton site. By 2005, Queen's Campus, Stockton, accounted for around 18 per cent of the total university student population.

In 2005, the university unveiled a re-branded logotype and introduced the trading name of Durham University, although the legal name of the institution remained the University of Durham and the official coat of arms was unchanged. The same year, St Mary's College had its first mixed undergraduate intake. In October 2006, Josephine Butler College opened its doors to students as Durham's newest college – the first purpose-built self-catering college for students within Durham. This was the first new college to open in Durham itself since the creation of Collingwood in the 1970s.

In May 2010, Durham joined the Matariki Network of Universities (MNU) together with Dartmouth College (US), Queen's University (Canada), University of Otago (New Zealand), University of Tübingen (Germany), University of Western Australia and Uppsala University (Sweden). In 2012, Durham (along with York, Exeter and Queen Mary, University of London) joined the Russell Group of research-intensive British universities.

Between 2010 and 2012, the university was criticised for accepting funds from controversial sources, including the government of Iran, the US State Department, the prime minister of Kuwait, and British American Tobacco.

==== Closure of Queen's Campus and expansion in Durham ====
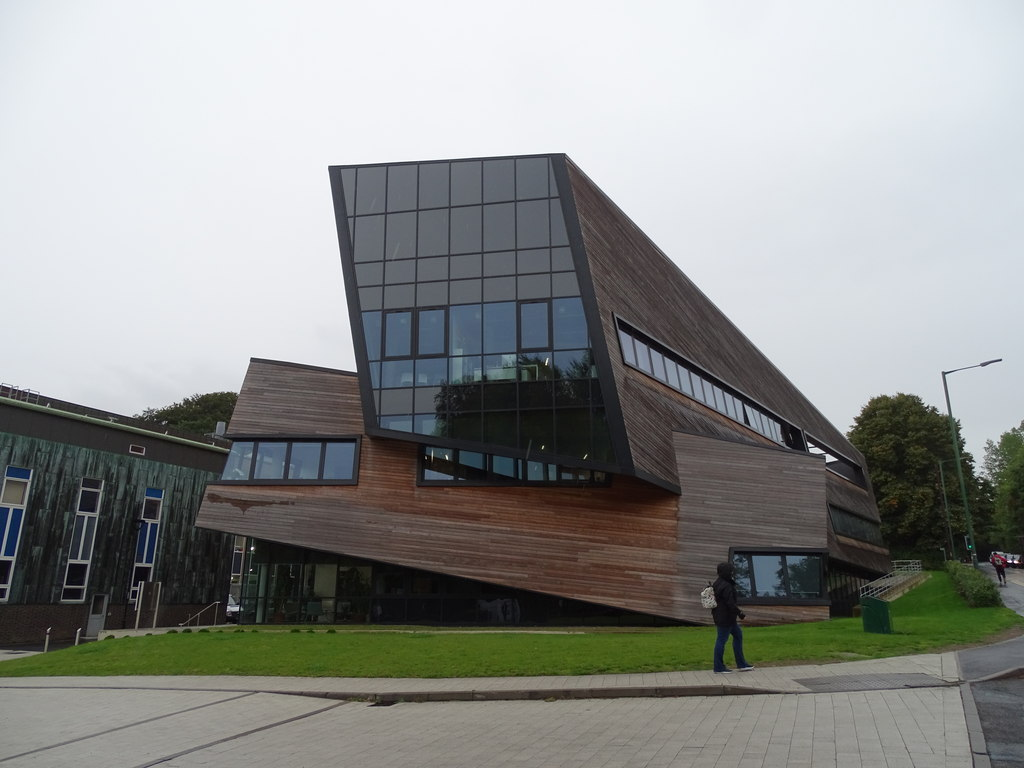
The Ogden Centre for Fundamental Physics, next to the Department of Physics

The university announced in 2016 that it would relocate the colleges and academic activities currently at the Queen's Campus to Durham City from 2017; with the School of Medicine, Pharmacy and Health being transferred to Newcastle University. The Queen's Campus became an International Study Centre to prepare overseas students to study at Durham, run by Study Group.

In March 2017, Lord Rees opened the Ogden Centre for Fundamental Physics, designed by Daniel Libeskind. The new building, named after alumnus Peter Ogden, provides extra laboratories and office space for 140 staff. In May 2017, the university announced a new ten-year strategy that proposed investing £700m in improving the campus, creating 300 new academic posts, increasing the size of the university to 21,500 students, while attracting more international students, and expanding the business school and the departments of law, politics, English and history to reach "critical research mass".

In 2018, the university announced that a consortium led by Interserve would design, build and operate two colleges at Mount Oswald (new buildings for John Snow College and one new college) for £105 million. The project company (in which the university has a 15 per cent stake) financed the construction via a £90 million 46-year bond issue. The two colleges opened in 2020. Separately, the university announced that it had raised £225 million to fund its estate masterplan through the private sale of long-term bonds to British and US investors. In 2021, it was reported that there was a culture of sexism and bullying at Durham, and that the university had been reluctant to address structural problems, thereby enabling this culture to develop relatively unchallenged.

In 2025, North East England was named an "AI Growth Zone" as part of a technology partnership agreed between the UK and the US, with the region's universities expected to play a major role in delivering this. Following this, Durham announced a partnership with Sage to deliver continuing professional development and professional training in AI skills in the region. At the London Tech Week 2026, Microsoft UK and Ireland CEO Darren Hardman announced that the company would launch its first AI Skills Centre of Excellence at Durham University, aimed at supporting the university community and organisations across North East England. This opened in October 2026. Alongside these, Durham University theology professor Anna Rowlands was one of the speakers at the launch of Pope Leo XIV's encyclical Magnifica humanitas on AI.

== Campus ==
Durham University owns a 257 ha (640-acre) estate, of which 251 ha (620 acres) is in Durham. This contains part of the Durham Castle and Cathedral UNESCO World Heritage Site and multiple other heritage assets, including three ancient monuments (the Maiden Castle Iron Age promontory fort, Cosin's Library and Divinity House), four grade I listed buildings (including Kingsgate Bridge, the Exchequer Building on Palace Green, the gatehouse, keep, north range and west range of Durham Castle, and multiple listings covering surviving sections of the castle walls around the north of the castle and along the top of the river bank behind Hatfield College and St Cuthbert's Society) and 79 grade II or II* listed buildings. As of 2023, the estate in Durham included 112 ha (280 acres) of woodland scrub (with 46 ha (110 acres) of woodland designated as Areas of High Landscape Value, including the 32.4 ha (80 acres) of Great High Wood, Hollingside Wood and Blaid's Wood additionally designated as Ancient Semi-Natural Woodlands, Sites of Nature Conservation Importance and Sites of Ecological Value), 53 ha (130 acres) of farming and grazing land, and 27 ha (67 acres) of amenity grassland, alongside 51.4 ha (127 acres) of built environment. The estate also includes the Queen's Campus in Stockton-on-Tees.

One of the major public attractions in Durham City is the 10 ha (25-acre) Botanic Gardens, established (on the current site) in 1970, with more than 80,000 visitors annually. As of 2021, the university estate contains more than 380 buildings with a floor area of 424,600 square metres (4,570,000 sq ft), including 189,400 square metres (2,039,000 sq ft) of residential area in 170 residential buildings (not including the independent St Chad's and St John's colleges, which are not owned by the university). The insurance reinstatement value was estimated as close to £850 million in 2014.

=== Durham City ===
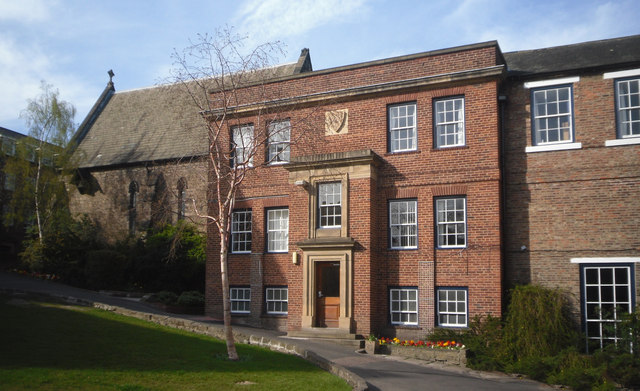
Hatfield College, one of the five colleges along the Bailey

Durham City is the main location of the university and contains all of the colleges and academic departments. The Durham City estate is spread across several different sites.

==== The Peninsula ====
The Bailey and Palace Green form the historic centre of the university and contain five colleges, as well as the departments of music, history, classics and ancient history, and theology and religion, the Institute of Advanced Study, Palace Green Library (housing the university's special collections), the archaeological museum, the Durham Union Society, and the Assembly Rooms Theatre. The Bailey is linked to Dunelm House, home of Durham Students' Union in New Elvet, by the university's Kingsgate Bridge.

==== Elvet ====
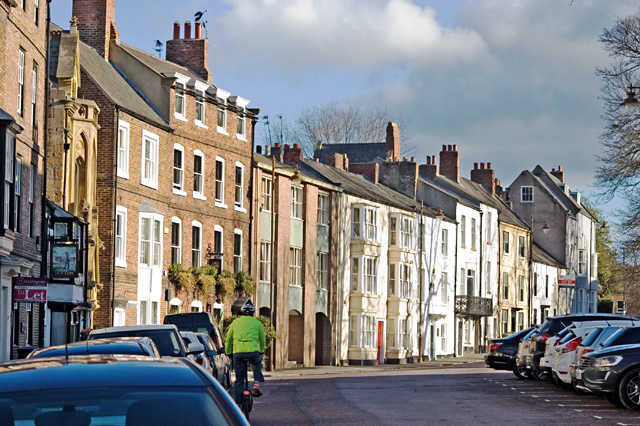
Old Elvet is the home of a number of departments

The Elvet area contains the departments of English studies and philosophy along with the school of modern languages and cultures in the faculty of arts as well as department of sport and exercise sciences of the faculty of social sciences and health. While many of the departments are in converted houses, the Elvet Riverside complex is home to the school of modern languages and cultures and parts of the department of English studies. Durham Students' Union is based in Dunelm House, just north of Elvet Riverside, linked to the peninsula area by Kingsgate Bridge. The Racecourse has university playing fields, including the main cricket ground. While no colleges are based in the Elvet area, it does contain the Parson's Field accommodation for St Cuthbert's Society and Hatfield College's James Barber House and Palmer's Garth accommodation.

==== Leazes Road ====
The Leazes Road site on the north bank of the Wear, opposite the Racecourse playing-fields and Old Elvet, was home to the School of Education and Hild Bede College. As of 2024, this site is being redeveloped and refurbished with the aim that a 19th college will be established adjacent to Hild Bede. In preparation for redevelopment, departments and facilities were relocated from Leazes Road in 2022, and Hild Bede college moved temporarily to Rushford Court in the viaduct area in summer 2024. UPP were announced in May 2024 as the preferred bidders to deliver the refurbishment of Hild Bede and the building of the new 19th college under a design, build, fund and operate model.

==== Mountjoy ====
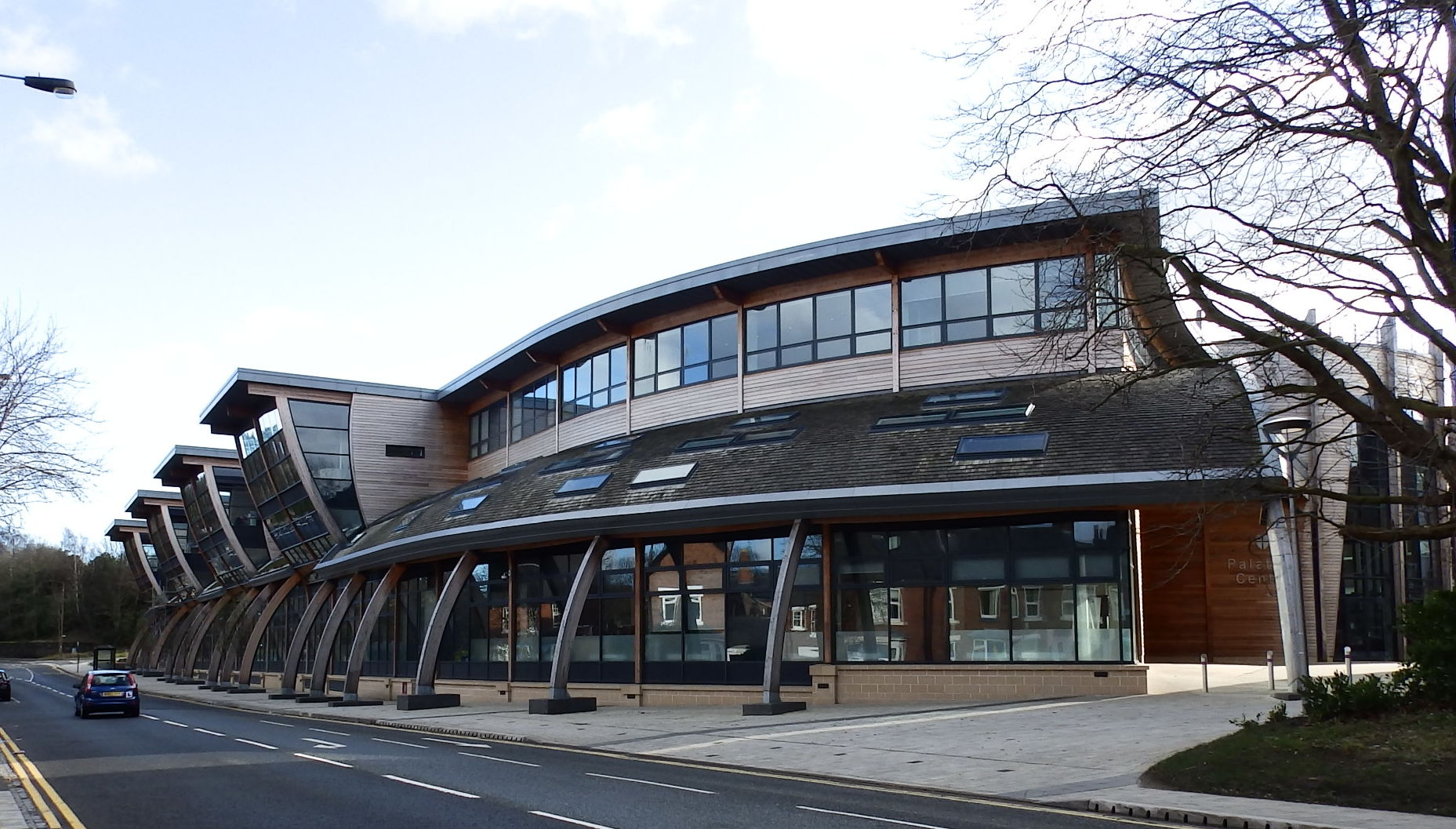
The Palatine Centre on the Mountjoy site, home of the university's administration

The Mountjoy site (formerly the Science site) south of Elvet contains many of the university's departments, including all the departments in the faculty of science and most of the departments in the faculty of social science and health. It is also home to the university's central administration, in the Palatine Centre, the main Bill Bryson Library, and central teaching facilities at the Calman Learning Centre and the Lower Mountjoy Teaching and Learning Centre.

==== Elvet Hill ====
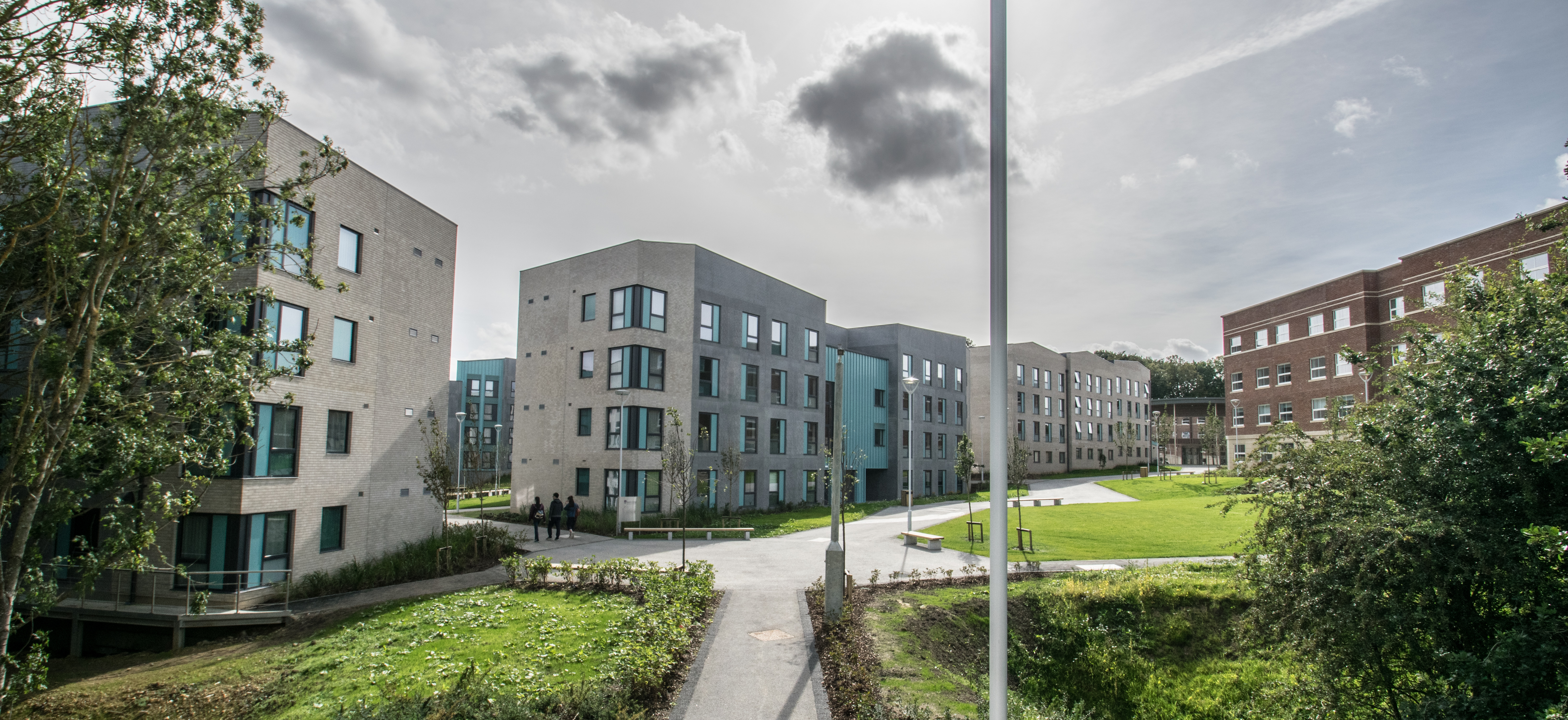
South (left) and John Snow (right) colleges on the Mount Oswald site

Elvet Hill, south of the Mountjoy site, has ten of the colleges, as well as the botanic garden and the vice-chancellor's residence in Hollingside House. Mill Hill Lane is home to the departments of accounting, economics and finance from the business school, and the department of sociology from the faculty of social sciences, Elsewhere on Elvet Hill are the school of government and international affairs from the faculty of social sciences in the Al-Qasimi Building, as well as the Teikyo University of Japan in Durham and Durham University Oriental Museum.

==== Elsewhere in Durham ====
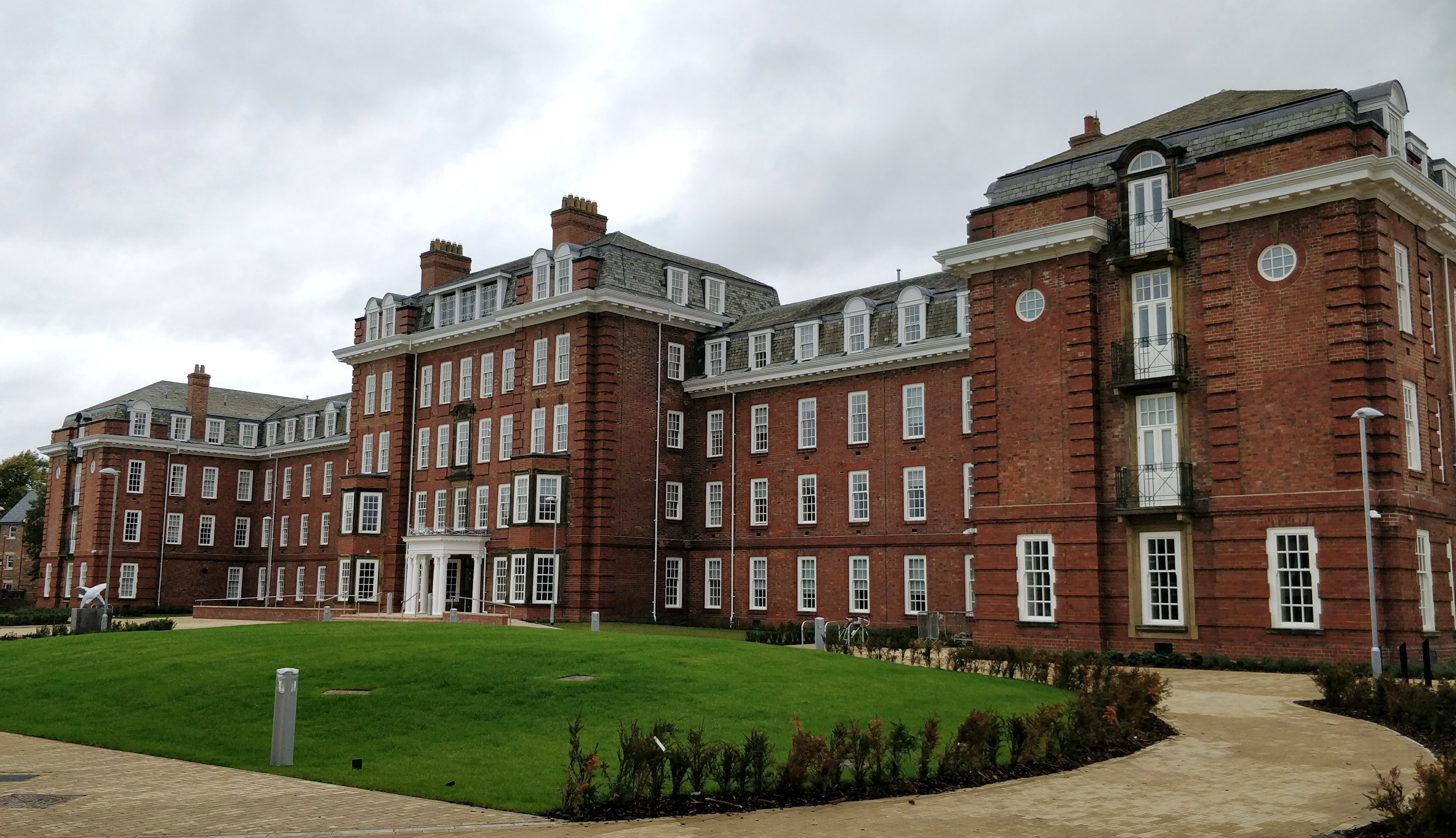
Sheraton Park, site of a former teacher training college and home to Ustinov College since 2017

Ustinov College, Durham's postgraduate college, is located in Sheraton Park, beyond Elvet Hill. Rushford Court, owned by Unite Students, is the temporary home of Hild Bede College as of 2024 and was also used by John Snow College in 2019–20. In the longer term, it is planned to become Durham's 18th college.

The Waterside Building, home of the business school's Department of Management and Marketing from 2024, is on the east bank of the River Wear north (downstream) of the city centre, in the Durham Innovation District. Plans were approved in 2025 for a new university data centre at Aykley Heads, also within the innovation district, to house a new supercomputer. Boldon House in Pity Me houses professional services staff.

==== Development plans ====
In 2017, the university published a strategy document setting out (among other things) a roadmap for development of the estate over the period to 2027, including the development of a new home for the business school at Elvet Waterside (Old Elvet), planned to open in 2021, the redevelopment of the arts and humanities facilities at Elvet Riverside (New Elvet), planned to open from 2022, the construction of four to six new colleges, and the continued development of the Mountjoy site. The university's Estate Masterplan for 2017–2027 identified the area around Howlands Farm (Josephine Butler and Stephenson colleges), the Leazes Road site (Hild Bede College), and the business school site on Mill Hill as possible locations for new accommodation development (i.e., new colleges). A "strategy refresh" was approved in 2023, which included establishing a new cultural quarter on the old swimming baths site in Elvet and developing interdisciplinary science research and laboratory facilities at Upper Mountjoy.

In February 2025, the university requested an Environmental Impact Assessment Scoping Opinion from the county council regarding plans for work on the Hild-Bede site that would involve the demolition of multiple buildings, including the non-designated heritage asset Haworth House, and construction of the new 19th college and a hub building, with an estimated 375 bed spaces in the retained buildings and 600 in the new buildings. The request also included redevelopment of postgraduate accommodation on Leazes Road, with 30 refurbished bed spaces and 70 new spaces, and the development of new postgraduate accommodation with 450 bed spaces on the site of Elvet Hill car park. The university clarified in March 2025 that these were "options being explored" and might not form part of the final plan. In March 2026, the university announced that the redevelopment with the preferred external bidder had been halted due to "the very challenging cost and nature of construction projects at the moment".

==== Ushaw College ====
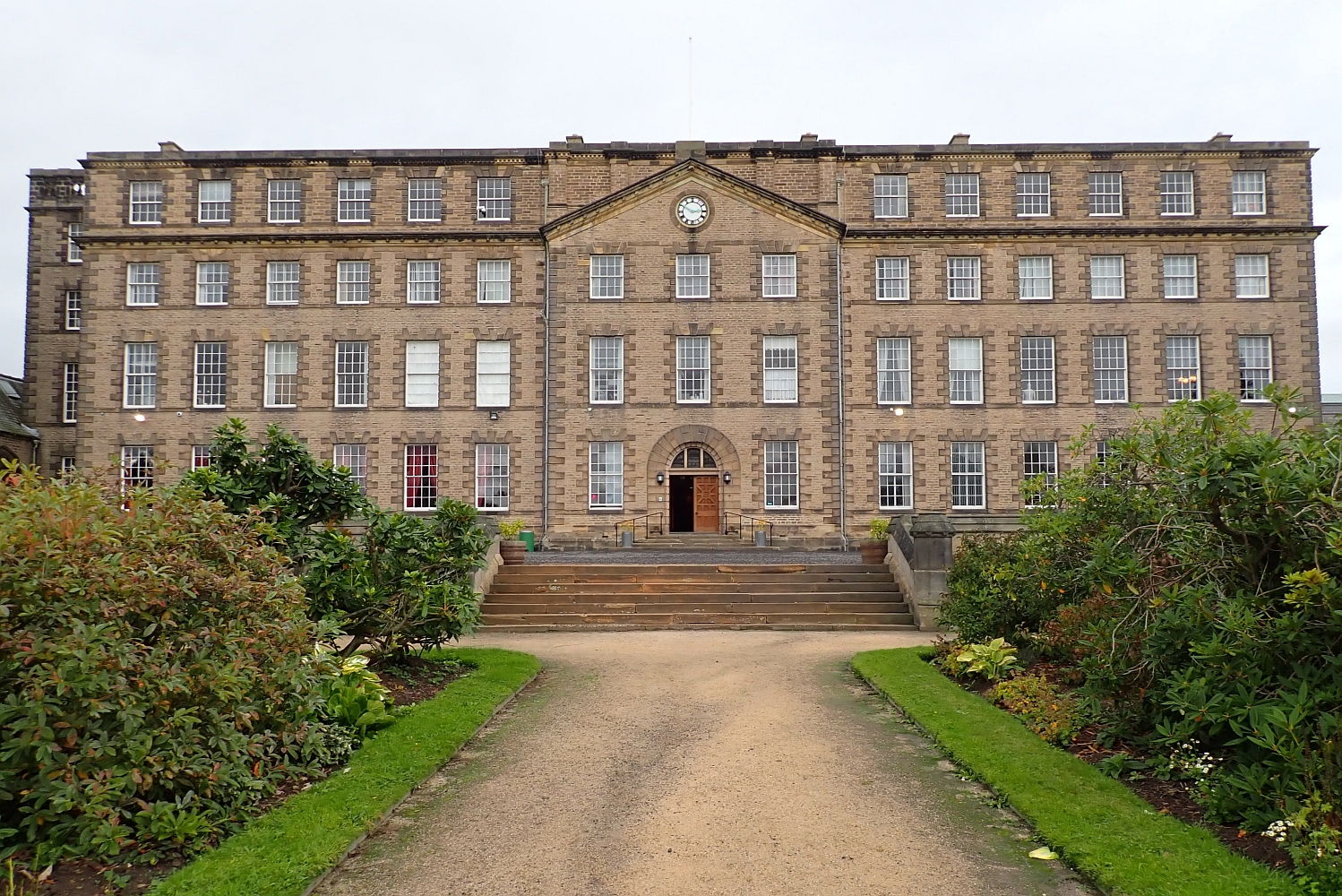
Ushaw College main building

Ushaw College, five miles west of Durham, is a former Catholic seminary that was a licensed hall of residence of the university. It hosts parts of the business school and of the centre for Catholic studies, with the university having committed to leasing the east wing until 2027 and to establishing a residential research library at Ushaw.

=== Queen's Campus ===
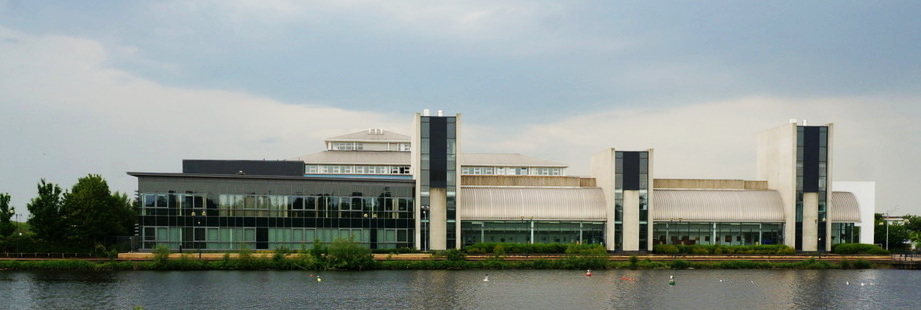
Wolfson Research Institute at the Queen's Campus

Queen's Campus is in the borough of Stockton-on-Tees (Thornaby, North Yorkshire) 30 miles from Durham City. Until 2017–18, the campus was home to around 2,000 full-time students in two colleges (John Snow and Stephenson Colleges) and the Wolfson Research Institute, with a bus connecting Queen's Campus to Durham City.

Between 2017 and 2018, the colleges and academic departments were relocated, and Queen's Campus became an International Study Centre (ISC) run by Study Group, preparing non-EU foreign students to enter degree courses at the university, from September 2017. The former John Snow College buildings were sold in 2020 and, from 2022, only the Ebsworth building has been used by the ISC.

=== Libraries ===
The original university library, now known as the Palace Green Library

Durham University Library was founded in January 1833 at Palace Green with a 160-volume donation by the bishop of Durham, William Van Mildert, and now holds more than 1.5 million printed items across four branches: Bill Bryson Library (the main library), Queen's Campus Library, Durham University Business School Library and Palace Green Library, which holds the special and heritage collections.

In 2005, designated status was granted by the Museums, Libraries and Archives Council to two of the special collections: Bishop Cosin's Library on Palace Green (founded in 1669 and including medieval manuscripts and early printed books) and the Sudan Archive, held in Palace Green Library.

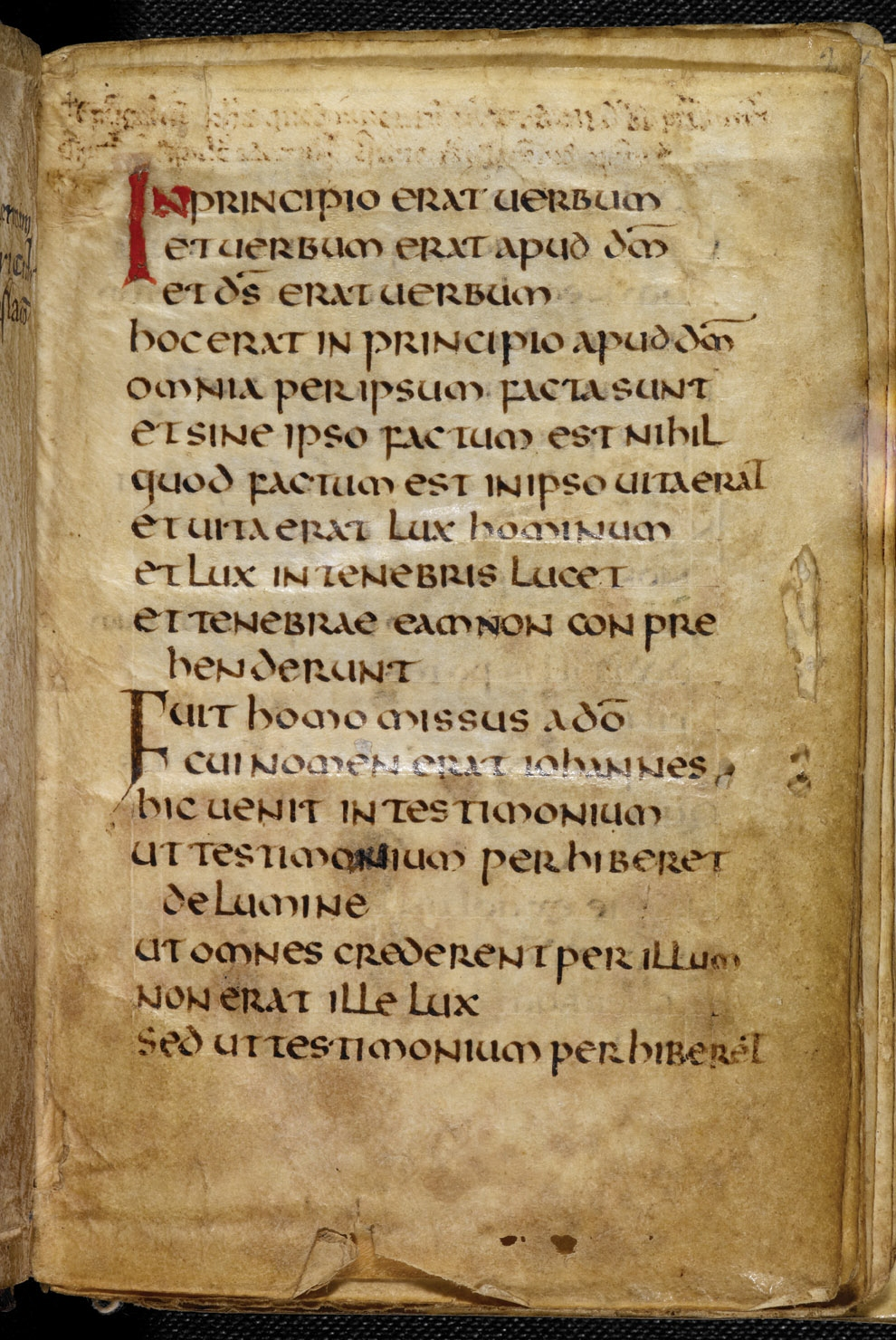
St Cuthbert Gospel, an 8th-century gospel book

In 2012 the university, together with the British Library and Durham Cathedral, purchased Europe's oldest intact book, the St Cuthbert Gospel, for the nation for £9 million. It is displayed equally in London and Durham, being shown at the university's Palace Green Library for the first time as part of the Lindisfarne Gospels Durham exhibition in 2013.

In addition to the central library system, many colleges maintain their own libraries, such as the Bettenson, Brewis, Williams and Fenton Libraries of St Chad's College, which contain more than 38,000 volumes. Durham staff and students can also access the libraries of Durham Cathedral and Ushaw College. Some departments, such as classics and ancient history, also have their own libraries.

In February 2017, the university announced a £2 million investment to establish the first residential research library at a UK university, in collaboration with Ushaw College and Durham Cathedral and offering access to the collections of all three institutions.

=== Museums ===
The Old Fulling Mill, original home of the Durham University Museum in 1833, on the bank of the River Wear below Durham Cathedral

The university's Museums, Galleries and Exhibitions manages three museums open to the public, all accredited by Arts Council England through the UK Museum Accreditation Scheme, as well as two non-public collections. Total holdings are more than 100,000 pieces.

Built in the 1960s, the Durham University Oriental Museum grew predominantly from the acquisitions of the university's former School of Oriental Studies. The collection contains more than 30,000 objects, from Asian art to antiquities, covering the Orient and Levant to the Far East and the Indian Sub-continent, with more than a third of the collection relating to China. The Chinese collection and the Egyptian collection were granted Designated Status as collections of national importance by the Museums, Libraries and Archives Council in 2008. The Japanese collection was designated in 2026.

The Durham University Museum of Archaeology, housed in Palace Green Library, originally opened in 1833 and was the second university museum in England to allow admittance to the general public. It focuses on the heritage of North East England and includes national and international collections spanning the Prehistoric, Ancient Greek, Roman, Anglo-Saxon, Medieval and Post Medieval periods.

Durham Castle Museum has around 5,000 pieces from the history of the castle, including suits of armour, tapestries, silverware and art.

In addition to the three public museums, the university also holds a biosciences collection and an art collection.

=== Chapels, prayer rooms and other faith resources ===
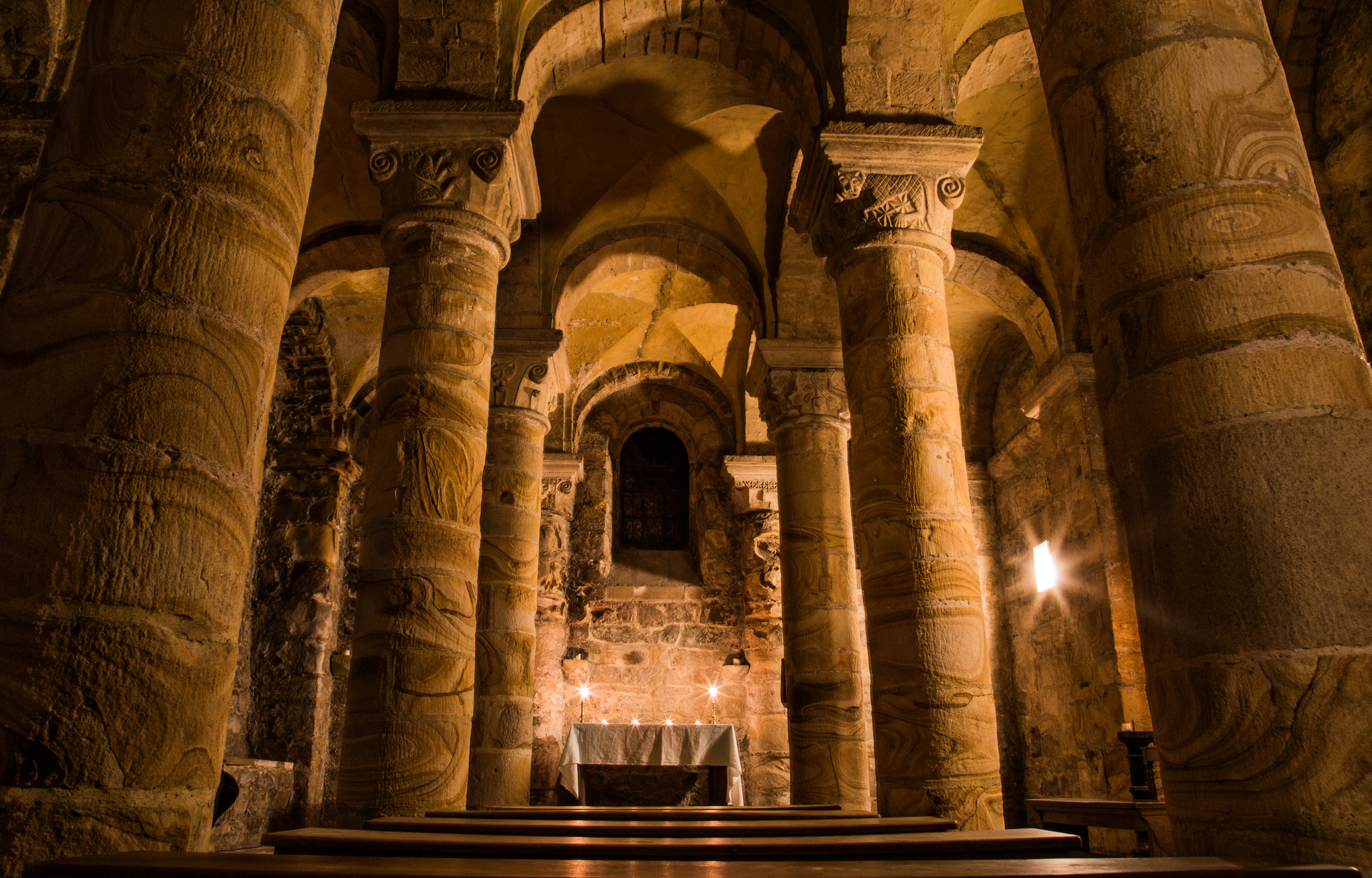
University College's Norman Chapel, built c. 1080, is the oldest surviving building in Durham

Architecturally important chapels include the 11th-century Norman Chapel in University College and the Art Deco chapel in Hild Bede College. There are active Anglican chapels at Grey, Hatfield, Hild Bede, St Chad's, St John's, St Mary's and University colleges.

There are also multi-faith or quiet rooms at St Aidan's College, Trevelyan College, in the Mt Oswald hub building shared by John Snow and South colleges, at Josephine Butler College, and in the teaching and learning centre. Muslim prayer rooms are located in Old Elvet and at Grey College. There is a kosher kitchen in St Aidan's College that supports Jewish Sabbath meals and other festivals, and a dedicated space for Jewish students.

=== Environmental initiatives ===
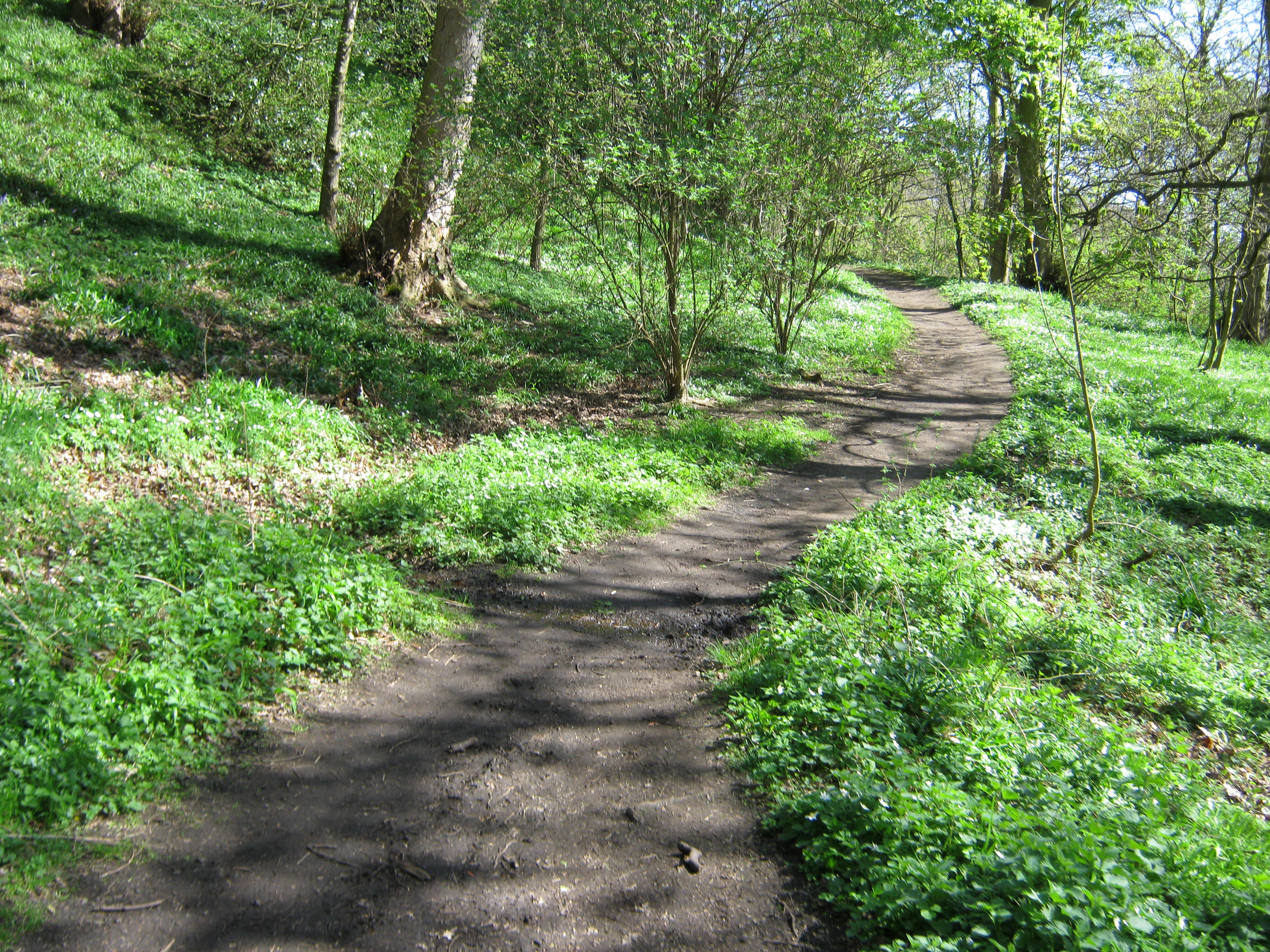
A path through the Great High Wood, an ancient woodland on the university campus

Durham has committed to reaching net zero by 2035 and to achieving a net biodiversity gain on campus by 2032. The university joined the Hedgehog Friendly Campus campaign in 2020, receiving silver accreditation in 2021/22 and gold accreditation in 2022/23, before becoming one of only six universities with the highest level platinum accreditation in 2024. It was a founding member of the Nature Positive Universities Alliance in 2022. Actions taken to enhance biodiversity have included converting 9 hectares (22 acres) of lawns to grassland and enriching 4 hectares (10 acres) of land in the botanic garden to increase wildflower diversity.

The green initiatives at the university and its rise in two years from 96th (3rd class) to 30th in the People and Planet University League (between 2019 and 2021) have been noted in the national press. In the 2025/26 table, it was ranked 44th (2:1 class). Internationally, the university was ranked joint 24th globally for sustainability in the QS World University Rankings: Sustainability 2026 and joint 33rd globally in the 2026 Times Higher Education Sustainability Impact Ratings, based on the UN Sustainable Development Goals.

Durham has won multiple Green Gown Awards:

- Nature Positive category (2023) for the Enhancing Biodiversity plan (also 'highly commended' at the International Green Gown Awards 2024)
- Enterprise category (2021) for Project RENU (Research Expedition for Net zero and Universal learning)
- Community category (2017) for Van Mildert College Outreach
- Continuous Improvement category (2015) for the Greenspace Movement
- Sustainable Procurement category (2011)
- Sustainable Procurement category (2010)

Durham University established the MammalWeb citizen science platform in 2013 in partnership with Durham Wildlife Trust. This is now a national non-profit and remains closely linked to the university. The project won the National Biodiversity Network Group Award in 2024.

In 2025, the installed solar power capacity on Durham University buildings reached 1 MW, expected to provide just under 1 GWh of electricity per year.

== Organisation and administration ==
=== Academic year ===
The academic year at Durham is divided into three terms: Michaelmas term, which lasts 10 weeks from October to December; Epiphany term, which lasts ten weeks from January to March; and Easter term, which lasts nine weeks from April to June. All terms start on a Monday. The weeks of term are called "Teaching Weeks", numbered from 1 (start of Michaelmas) to 29 (end of Easter), although this period is used for teaching and exams. Additionally, there is an "Induction Week" (informally known as "Freshers' Week" or Week 0) for first year students prior to the start of Michaelmas term, starting on the first Monday in October.

=== Colleges ===
Durham operates a collegiate structure with the colleges being "listed bodies" under the Education Reform Act 1988, as bodies that appear to the Secretary of State "to be a constituent college, school, hall or other institution of a university which is such a recognised body" (the "recognised body" being, in this case, Durham University). Though most of the Durham colleges are governed and owned directly by the university itself (the exceptions being St John's and St Chad's), the legal status of the Durham colleges as listed bodies is similar to those at Oxford and Cambridge, setting them apart from those at the universities of Lancaster and York. However, unlike at Oxford and Cambridge, there is no formal teaching at Durham colleges (with the exception of Cranmer Hall theological college within St John's), although colleges are active in research. All of the college heads are ex officio members of the university senate.

Formal dinners (known as "formals") are held at every college; gowns are worn to these events at just over half of the colleges. There is a great deal of intercollegiate rivalry, particularly in rowing and other sporting activities. There is also rivalry between the older "Bailey" colleges and the newer "Hill" colleges on Elvet Hill.

The 17 colleges are:

- Collingwood
- Grey
- Hatfield
- John Snow
- Josephine Butler
- South
- St Aidan's
- St Chad's
- St Cuthbert's
- St Hild & St Bede
- St John's
- St Mary's
- Stephenson
- Trevelyan
- University
- Ustinov
- Van Mildert

=== Governance ===
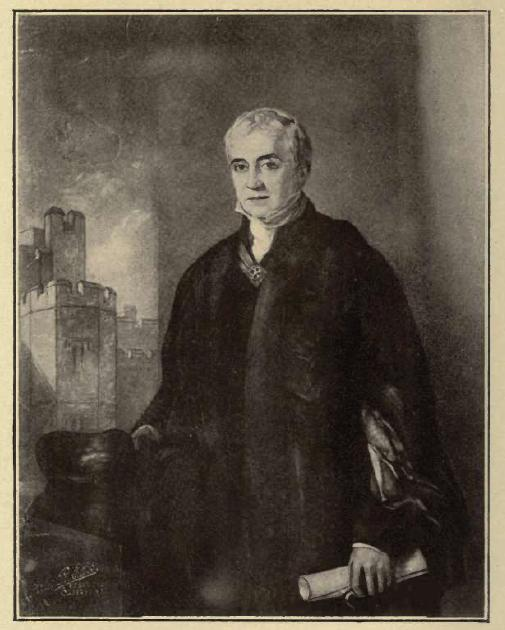
Archdeacon Charles Thorp, founder and first Warden of Durham

The university is governed by the statutes put in place by the Universities of Durham and Newcastle upon Tyne Act, 1963 and subsequently amended by council and approved by the King in Council, most recently in 2023, and by ordinances passed by council.

Council is the governing body, the corporation and the charity trustees of the university. It is composed of eleven internal and thirteen external ('lay') members. There are three ex-officio members internal to the university: the vice-chancellor and warden, the deputy vice-chancellor and provost, and the president of Durham Student's Union, along with seven appointed members from the university, who may not be members of the university executive committee and five of whom must be members of academic staff, and one appointed postgraduate student nominated by the student's union. There are also twelve appointed lay members (not being teachers or salaried staff in the university or any of its colleges), and the Dean of Durham as an ex-officio lay member. The chair of the council, the deputy chair, and the senior independent governor must be lay members of the council. Since August 2025, the chair of council has been Caroline Johnstone. While there is no formal requirement for alumni representation on the council, six of the appointment lay members (including the deputy chair) were Durham graduates as of the 2024/25 academic year.

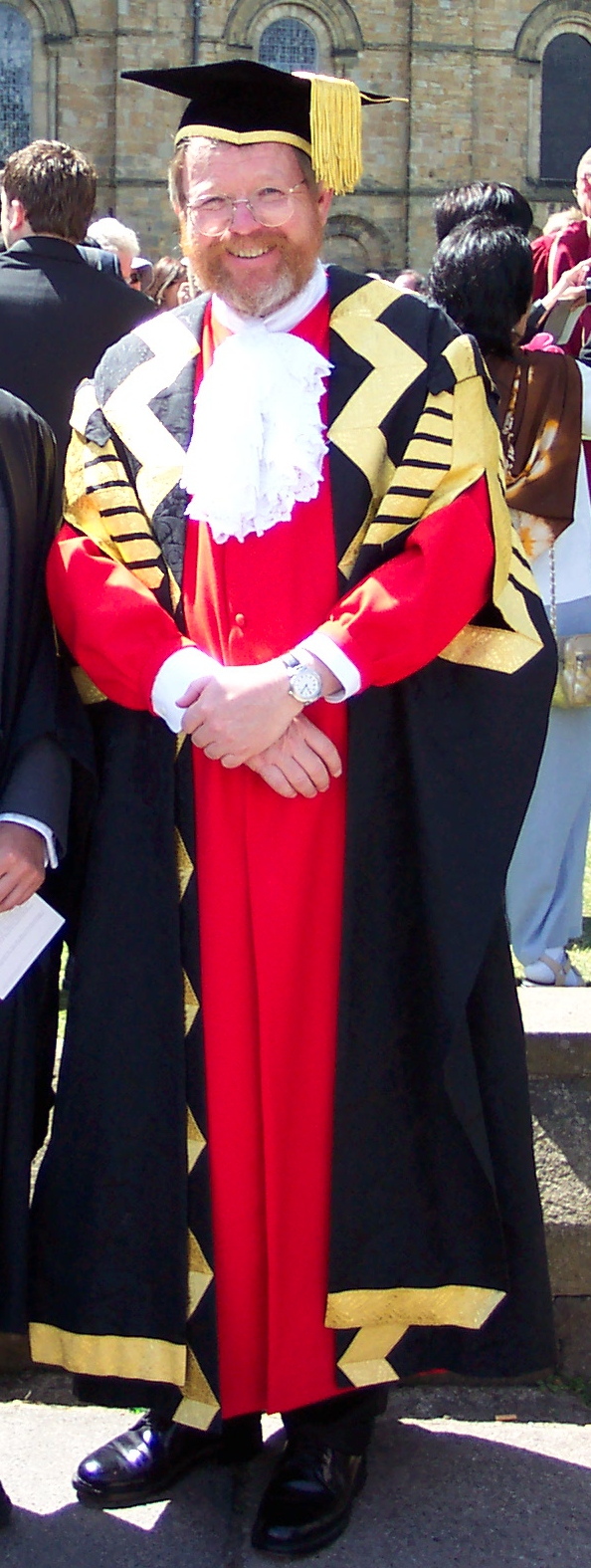
Bill Bryson (Chancellor 2005–2012) in the academic dress of Chancellor of Durham University

The chancellor is the ceremonial head of the university and one of the statutory officers. The current chancellor is Fiona Hill, who was appointed in November 2022 in succession to Sir Thomas Allen and took office in June 2023. The chancellor is appointed by convocation for "a term of up to five years" with "no scope for re-appointment". The role of the chancellor is ceremonial, being to confer degrees and to act as an ambassador for the university; the vice-chancellor and warden is the chief executive officer of the university and is appointed by council after consultation with senate. As warden, the vice-chancellor is responsible for the 15 maintained colleges of the university. Since January 2022 this has been Karen O'Brien, the university's first female vice-chancellor and warden, succeeding Stuart Corbridge who retired in July 2021. The other statutory officers of the university are the university secretary and the chief financial officer, while other (non-statutory) officers established by council are the deputy vice-chancellor and provost, the pro-vice-chancellors, the executive deans of the faculties, and the chief operating officer.

The day-to-day running of the university is in the hands of the university executive committee, which is established by the ordinances as a joint committee of council and senate. It supports the vice-chancellor and warden in their statutory responsibility for the performance and strategic direction of the university and is chaired by the vice-chancellor and warden.

Convocation is the assembly of the university, with the purpose of discussing the latest developments and future plans of the university, receiving the university's annual report, and appointing the chancellor. Membership of convocation includes the chancellor, vice-chancellor and warden, deputy vice-chancellor provost, pro-vice-chancellors, the alumni and alumnae of the university, and other officers appointed to convocation by council on the recommendation of senate. It meets at least once a year to receive the annual report and further extraordinary meetings can be called if representation is made by a minimum of 50 members or if called by the vice-chancellor and warden. Appointment of the chancellor is on the joint nomination of council and senate, and is by majority vote of the members of convocation present and voting.

The visitor of the university is the bishop of Durham, or a suffragan bishop if the see of Durham is vacant. The visitor's power is limited to matters internal to the university, where they may settle disputes "relating to the interpretation and application of the university's statues" and "between members of the university in their capacity as members". The visitor may also "inspect and regulate members' actions and behaviour in their capacities as members" and "correct abuses and irregularities in the internal regulation of the university". Following the Higher Education Act 2004, the visitor has no jurisdiction regarding student complaints or employment disputes between staff and the university.

==== Academic governance ====
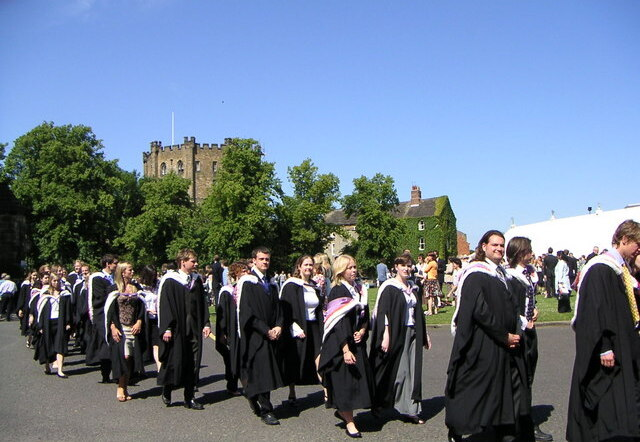
The university's graduation ceremonies, known as congregations, take place in Durham Cathedral with 'congregation fair' receptions on Palace Green

Academic governance is overseen by the senate, with council having the responsibility of "receiv[ing] and test[ing] assurances that [this] is adequate and effective". Senate is, along with council, one of the two statutory bodies of the university, and is established by the university statutes, with membership including the vice-chancellor and warden, the deputy vice-chancellor and provost, the pro-vice-chancellors, faculty deans, heads of departments, heads of colleges, elected representatives of the academic staff, and student representatives. It operates under the delegated authority of the council and has the statutory duty to "inform and provide assurance to the Council regarding the University's academic standards, quality of education and research". It has the power to grant and revoke degrees (including honorary degrees) and also regulates admissions, examinations, and the use of the academic dress of the university, as well as having oversight of student discipline and student experience.

The academic electoral assembly (AEA) is established by the statutes of the university and consists of all members of academic staff, except those who are ex-officio members of senate, and the vice-principals of the recognised colleges and any other members of staff performing academic or academic-related roles. It elects the academic staff representatives to senate; these also constitute the standing committee of the AEA. The standing committee elects the chair and vice-chair of the AEA from among the members elected to senate. In addition to its role in electing members of senate, the AEA provides a forum for staff "to inform matters of academic governance and provide comment to the Senate". The statutes also allow for meetings of all members of the academic staff to be called by the vice-chancellor and warden, which may discuss any matter of interest to the university and make representations to the statutory bodies (council and senate). If requested in writing by one hundred or more members of the academic staff, the vice-chancellor and warden must call and attend a meeting of the academic staff.

==== Trade unions ====
There are four recognised campus trade unions at Durham with branches of the University and Colleges Union (UCU), UNISON, UNITE, and GMB. The four campus unions meet senior members of HR on a regular basis to negotiate on various matters.

Union activity in the 2020s has included winning a £1000 payment to all staff and a number of other commitments in 2022, and commitments from university management to become an accredited Real Living Wage employer, improvements in the starting salary grade for some staff and additional payments for international staff with visa costs in 2023. There is a history of trades union activity at the university stretching back many decades with joint action by all staff at the university in 1996 being one example.

=== Departments and faculties ===
The teaching departments of the university are divided into four faculties: science, arts and humanities, social sciences, and business. Each faculty is headed by an executive dean and one or more deputies. These, along with the heads of the departments in the faculty and the vice-chancellor, make up the faculty board for that faculty. Each department also has a board of studies consisting of the executive dean of their faculty, the teaching staff of the department, and student representatives. Associated with the first three faculties are three combined honours degrees: natural sciences (BSc and MSci), liberal arts (BA), and combined honours in social sciences (BA). Various joint honours degrees are also offered spanning multiple departments, such as the philosophy, politics and economics BA offered by the departments of philosophy, government and international affairs, and economics.

Faculty of social sciences

- Combined honours in social sciences programme
- Department of anthropology
- Department of archaeology
- Durham Centre for Academic Development
- School of education
- Department of geography
- School of government and international affairs
- Durham Law School
- Department of sociology
- Department of sport and exercise sciences

Faculty of arts and humanities

- Liberal arts programme
- Department of classics and ancient history
- Department of English studies
- Department of history
- School of modern languages and cultures
  (includes Arabic, Chinese, French, German, Hispanic studies, Italian, Japanese, Russian and the centre for foreign language study)
- Department of music
- Department of philosophy
- Department of theology and religion

Faculty of science

- Natural sciences programme
- Department of biosciences
- Department of chemistry
- Department of computer science
- Department of Earth sciences
- Department of engineering
- Department of mathematical sciences
- Department of physics
- Department of psychology
- Science education hub

Durham University Business School

- Department of accounting
- Department of economics
- Department of finance
- Department of management and marketing

=== Finances ===
In the financial year ending 31 July 2024, Durham had a total income of £513.4 million (2022/23 – £483.6 million) and total expenditure of £393 million (2022/23 – £488.7 million). Key sources of income included £301.9 million from tuition fees and education contracts (2022/23 – £290 million), £48.2 million from funding body grants (2022/23 – £46.8 million), £60.7 million from research grants and contracts (2022/23 – £57.5 million), £5.8 million from investment income (2022/23 – £5.7 million) and £11.9 million from donations and endowments (2022/23 – £9.4 million).

At year end, Durham had endowments of £106.6 million (2023 – £101.7 million) and total net assets of £544.3 million (2023 – £411 million). It holds the fourteenth-largest endowment of any university in the UK.

== Academic profile ==
=== Research ===
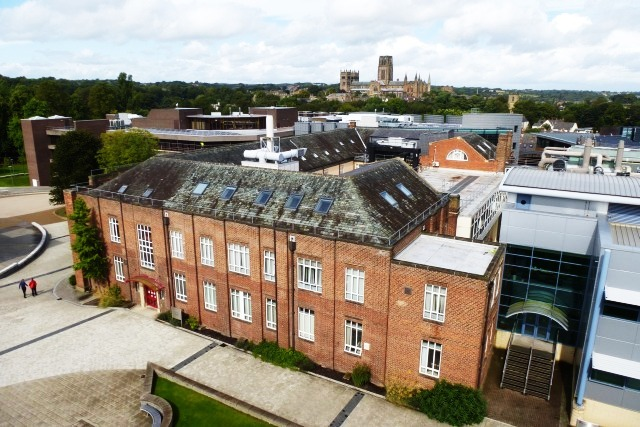
The Dawson Building houses the departments of Archaeology and Anthropology

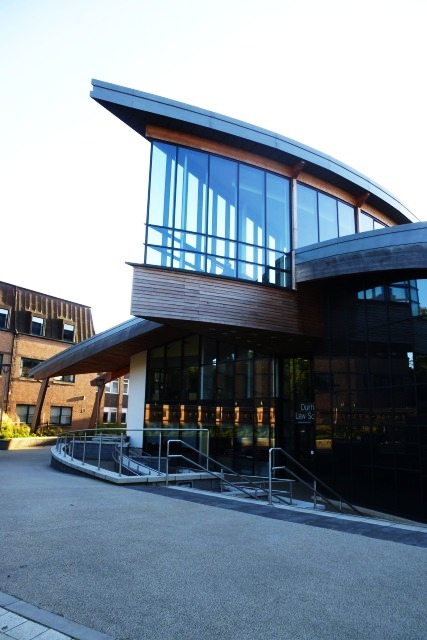
The Palatine Centre, home to Durham Law School

The university is part of the Russell Group of British research universities as well as the European Coimbra Group and the global Matariki Network of Universities. It is also a partner in the Arqus European University Alliance, part of the European Union's European Universities initiative, and is part of bilateral groups including the UK-Japan RENKEI network, the UK-Norway North Sea University Partnership, and the UK-Saudi Arabia Joint International Institute for Clean Hydrogen, and other international research consortia including the Virgo Consortium and the University of the Arctic. It is also part of regional groups including the N8 Research Partnership of universities in the north of England; Universities for North East England, bringing together the five universities in north east England; the Northern Accelerator knowledge exchange and research commercialisation partnership; and the Durham Learning Alliance in association with four further education colleges in County Durham. In 2025, it became the first UK university to host a plenary meeting of the European Research Council Scientific Council.

Durham hosts the 'memory intensive' service of the UK's tier-1 DiRAC supercomputer facility, as well as the N8 Research Partnership's tier-2 Bede supercomputer. It has partnered with the Net Zero Technology Centre, SHIFT Geothermal and the Reece Foundation to launch the UK National Geothermal Energy Centre, and also leads the UK National Clean Maritime Research Hub, a consortium of thirteen universities.

Research institutes at the university include the Biophysical Sciences Institute, the Durham Energy Institute, the Institute for Computational Cosmology, the Institute for Data Science, the Institute for Medical Humanities, the Institute for Particle Physics Phenomenology, the Institute of Advanced Study, the Institute of Hazard, Risk and Resiliance, the Institute of Medieval and Early Modern Studies, and the Wolfson Research Institute for Health and Wellbeing. There are also a large number of research centres located within departments, including the IBRU: Centre for Borders Research (Department of Geography) and the Durham Research in Economic Analysis and Mechanisms (Department of Economics), which has a research partnership with the Competition and Markets Authority's Microeconomics Unit at the UK Government's Darlington Economic Campus.

While Durham does not have a medical school, the "Health at Durham" programme takes in 44 institutes, centres, academies and projects from across the university. The programme focuses on non-clinical aspects of health, including physical, mental, social and environmental aspects of health. Durham hosts the Wellcome Trust-funded Black Health and the Humanities Network in the university's Institute of Medical Humanities, and is also one of the lead partners in the Northern Network for Medical Humanities Research. The Durham-led Global Network for Neglected Tropical Diseases won the Medical Research Council's Impact Prize for Outstanding Team Impact in 2024. The university was awarded a Queen's Anniversary Prize, the UK's highest academic honour, in the medicine and health category in 2018 for "Influential research on parent/infant sleep", in addition to one awarded in 1994 (the first year of the Queen's Anniversary Prizes) in the science and mathematics category for "Improving awareness of sciences and engineering in schools".

In the 2021 Research Excellence Framework (REF), Durham's research profile was assessed as 45 per cent world class (4*) (33 per cent in 2014), 45 per cent internationally important (3*) (50 per cent in 2014), 10 per cent internationally recognised (2*) (15 per cent in 2014) and 0 per cent nationally recognised (1*) (1 per cent in 2014). This gave it an overall "GPA" (calculated by Times Higher Education) of 3.34 (3.14 in 2014, 2.72 in the 2008 Research Assessment Exercise). However, this improvement was in the context of a rise in the average profile, leading to a fall in Durham's relative ranking by GPA from 20th in 2014 to joint 25th in 2021. Durham's indexed research power (calculated by Times Higher Education, with the top university by research power having an index of 1000) rose from 282 in 2014 (relative to UCL) to 299 in 2021 (relative to Oxford), and it remained ranked 20th by research power. Durham's 'market share' of funding (estimated by Times Higher Education) was expected to fall very slightly from 1.55 per cent in 2014 to 1.5 per cent in 2021. In regional terms, the success of Durham alongside Newcastle University and Northumbria University gave the North East the largest concentration of researchers in a city area outside of London.

=== Reputation and rankings ===
Rankings
National rankings
- Complete (2027): 6
- Guardian (2027): 6
- Times / Sunday Times (2027): 6

Global rankings
- ARWU (2026): 201–300
- QS (2027): 85
- THE (2026): 175

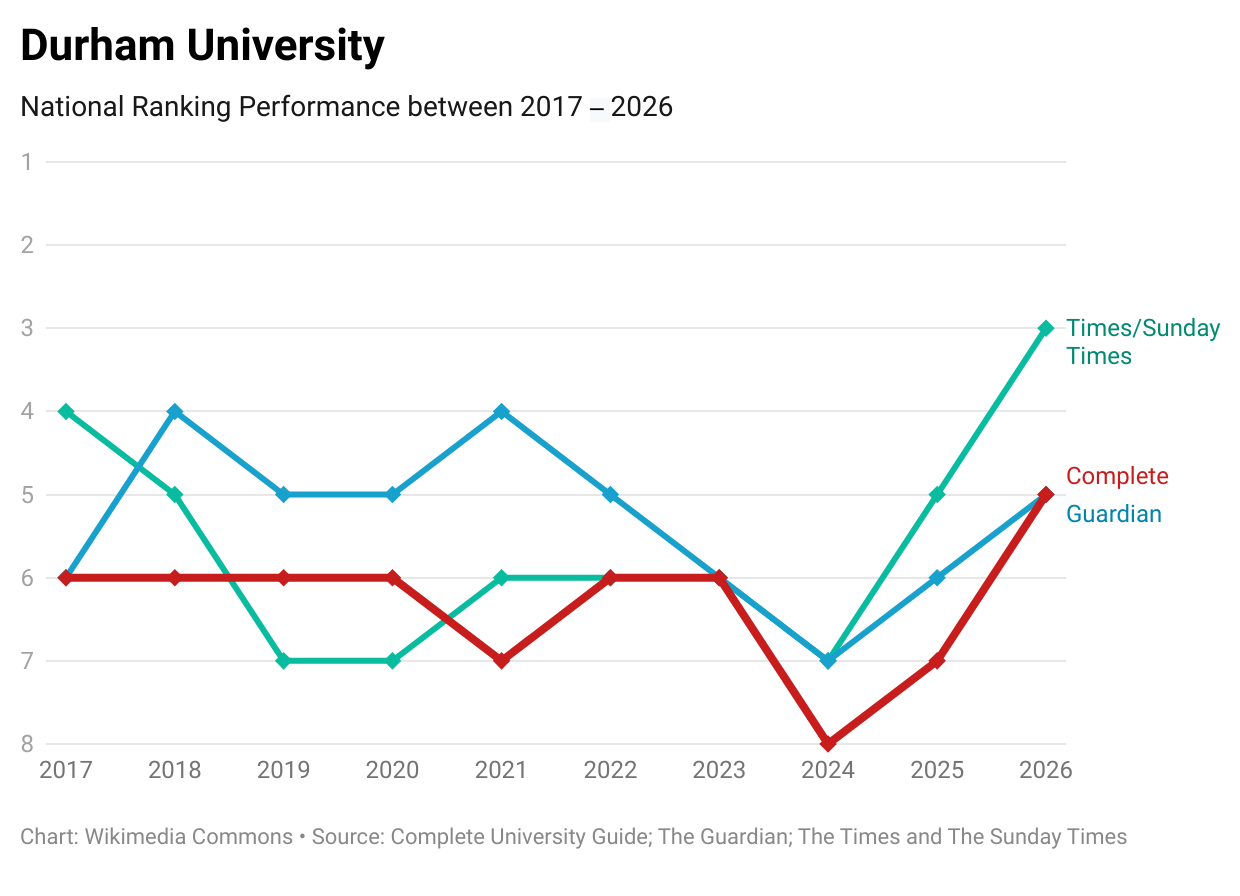
Durham University's national league table performance over the past ten years

As one of the oldest universities in the UK, and having an Oxbridge-style collegiate structure, and a highly selective admissions process, Durham is widely regarded as one of the UK's best universities, albeit not as prestigious as Oxford or Cambridge. It is one of the few universities to have won University Challenge more than once (1977, 2000 and 2023), as well as the 2024–25 and 2025–26 series of Christmas University Challenge for alumni. Durham was also Sunday Times University of the Year for 2005 and 2026.

Durham University's Strategic Plan 2017–2027 defined targets of being in the top five nationally on the Times/Sunday Times league table, of having 50 per cent of eligible subjects in the top 50 globally on the QS world rankings, and of being in the top three UK institutions by citations per academic staff member.

National

Durham regularly places in the top five in rankings of universities in the United Kingdom and is one of only four universities (along with Oxford, Cambridge and St Andrews) to have not left the top 10 in any of the three main domestic league tables since 2013. (Note: It has ranked in the Times top ten since the 2004 tables, the Complete University Guide top ten since it was founded in 2007 (2008 tables) and the Guardian top ten since the 2012 tables."Domestic Ranking of British Universities over a 10-Year Period". The University Buzz. Archived from the original on 29 April 2017.) The university was ranked fifth overall in the Complete University Guide 2026 and the Guardian University Guide 2026, and third overall in the Times and Sunday Times Good University Guide, placing it above Oxford and Cambridge and marking the first time in the guide's 32-year history that neither of the Oxbridge universities were ranked in its top three. In addition, the Times and Sunday Times Good University Guide 2026 named Durham as University of the Year and as University of the Year in the North and Northeast, as well as runner-up for University of the Year for Graduate Employment.

The High Fliers Research UK graduate market report for 2026 placed Durham 14th in its table of universities targeted by the largest number of top employees.

In the 2025 Complete University Guide subject rankings, Durham had 31 of 33 subjects ranked in the top ten. In The Guardian 2025 subject rankings, Durham had 21 of 28 subjects ranked in the top ten.

International

The Times Higher Education World University Rankings for 2026 placed Durham 175th. In subject area rankings for 2026, Durham was placed 40th for arts and humanities, 55th for law, 94th for education studies and 101-105th for psychology and physical sciences. Durham also ranked 34th in the Times Higher Education impact ranking for 2025, measuring the impact of universities' research, stewardship, outreach and teaching towards the United Nations' Sustainable Development Goals.

The Shanghai Academic Ranking of World Universities for 2025 placed Durham in the 201-300 range.

Durham University has maintained a QS World University Ranking in the top 100 since 2010. The QS World University Rankings 2026 placed Durham 94th in the world, while the QS European University Rankings 2025 placed Durham 32nd in Europe. In the QS World University Ranking by Subject 2025, Durham was ranked in the top ten in three subjects (archaeology; theology, divinity and religious studies; and classics and ancient history), in the top 50 in a further six subjects and in the top 100 in a further 13 subjects.

== Admissions ==
UCAS Admission Statistics
	2025	2024	2023	2022	2021
Applications (Note: Main scheme applications, International and UK)	37,395	34,795	34,150	34,205	32,570
Accepted	6,845	5,589	4,655	4,680	6,160
Applications/Accepted Ratio	5.5	6.2	7.3	7.3	5.3
Overall Offer Rate (%)	77.9	70.2	66.1	56.0	75.9
↳ UK only (%) (Note: UK domiciled applicants only)	75.3	67.7	62.0	48.1	71.1
Average Entry Tariff	—N/a	—N/a	172	181	185
↳ Top three exams (Note: The maximum tariff score for three exams is 168: the equivalent of A*A*A* at A-Level, 777 at HL for the IB Diploma Programme, or AAA at Advanced Higher)	—N/a	—N/a	157.3	158.5	159.6

Durham's student body consists of 16,560 undergraduates and 4,590 postgraduate students (2024/25). The university is consistently designated as a 'high-tariff' institution by the Department for Education, with the average undergraduate entrant to the university in recent years amassing between 157–160 UCAS Tariff points in their top three pre-university qualifications – the equivalent of A*AA to A*A*A at A-Level. Based on 2022/23 HESA entry standards data published in domestic league tables, which include a broad range of qualifications beyond the top three exam grades, the average student at Durham University achieved 181 points – the 11th highest in the country.

The university gave offers of admission to 48% of its undergraduate applicants in 2022, the 13th lowest offer rate across the country. In the 2023–24 academic year, 31 per cent of students (across all levels of study) came from outside the UK and 54 per cent of students were women.

The university has international articulation and pathway agreements with Berry College and Southwestern University in the US, providing for progression from their undergraduate degrees to master's degrees in the faculty of arts and humanities at Durham.

=== Widening access ===
UCAS statistics on low/high participation neighbourhoods
	2024	2023	2022	2021	2020
POLAR4 Q1 (lowest participation 20% neighbourhoods)
Offer rate difference (Note: Offer rate difference is the difference between the actual offer rate and the expected offer rate if predicted grades and subject choice were the only factors.)	+23.3	+23.1	+37.4	+23.4	+18.9
Significant? (Note: Significant? indicates whether the offer rate difference is statistically significant. All statistics refer to 18 year old, UK domiciled applicants.)	Yes	Yes	Yes	Yes	Yes
% of all offers	9.7	9.9	12.4	9.0	8.1
% of placed applicants	9.7	9.1	10.7	9.0	7.5
POLAR4 Q5 (highest participation 20% neighbourhoods)
Offer rate difference	-8.1	-9.3	-12.7	-9.9	-7.4
Significant?	Yes	Yes	Yes	Yes	Yes
% of all offers	44.5	42.8	38.4	43.4	46.1
% of placed applicants	45.4	46.7	39.2	43.1	45.7

Cosin's Hall, home to the Institute of Advanced Study

Durham was criticised in 2017 for not accepting as many students from low participation neighbourhoods, and from state schools, as might be expected from its admission standards and course offerings. For admissions in 2015/16 (the data published in 2017 that sparked the criticism), Durham had the third lowest percentage of state school students (among higher education institutions with over 1,000 full-time first-degree entrants) at 60.5 per cent, compared to a Higher Education Statistics Agency benchmark of 75 per cent. According to pro-vice-chancellor, Alan Hudson, this was a temporary drop from the 63 per cent level the university has reached in recent years, and to which it was expected to return in 2016/17. The university also fell short of its benchmark for admissions from low participation neighbourhoods, accepting 5.1 per cent, compared to a benchmark of 6 per cent. The data for 2016/17 showed that admissions from state schools had recovered to 62.9 per cent, still short of the location-adjusted benchmark of 74.9 per cent, and that admissions from low participation neighbourhoods were 5.2 per cent compared to the location-adjusted benchmark of 6.6 per cent.

Since 1992 the university has run a widening access programme, originally called the Centre for Lifelong Learning and now known as the Durham Centre for Academic Development. The centre provides access to Durham degrees for mature students who show academic promise but do not hold the traditional entry requirements. The centre runs a range of foundation year courses associated with specific degree courses.

Durham has partnered with the Sutton Trust since 2012 to run the Durham University Sutton Trust Summer School for gifted and talented school children from underrepresented backgrounds, leading to qualification with 16 to 32 UCAS Tariff points and a guaranteed conditional offer from Durham if they choose to apply. The university also runs the Durham International Summer School and partners with the Sutton Trust to run the Durham Teacher Summer School.

In 2014, Durham became the first UK university to participate in the Inside-Out Prison Exchange Program. The scheme, where students study alongside inmates, ran in Durham Prison and the high-security Frankland Prison in 2015 and was expanded to include Low Newton Prison in 2016.

Durham gives a bursary, known as the Durham Grant, to home undergraduate and PGCE students from low and middle income households, including all students receiving a means-tested maintenance loan. As of 2024, the maximum is £2,670 for students with a household income (as assessed by Student Finance England) of £30,000 or less, falling to a minimum bursary of £700 for students with a household income between £47,201 and £62,342. The university also runs the "Supported Progression" programme for sixth-form students, aimed at helping talented young people from the North East, Cumbria and Yorkshire to fulfill their potential via a two-year structured programme of events.

For UK domiciled young full-time undergraduate entrants in 2020/21, 61.6% came from state schools, significantly below the location-adjusted benchmark of 78.5%, and 7.6% came from low participation neighbourhoods, not significantly different from the location-adjusted benchmark of 8.0%. For UK-domiciled undergraduate entrants in 2022/23, UCAS data shows no significant difference in offer rate with gender, a statistically significantly higher offer rate for Black and Asian applicants coupled with a significantly lower offer rate for white applicants, and a statistically significantly higher offer rate for applicants from the 80% of neighbourhoods with the lowest rates of participation in higher education coupled with a significantly lower offer rate for applicants from the 20% of neighbourhoods with the highest rates of participation in higher education.

== Student life ==
=== College life ===
The Great Hall at University College – communal dining is traditional at most Durham colleges

Durham students belong to a college for the duration of their time at the university. Most students live in their college for the first year of their undergraduate life, then choose to 'live-out' in their second year, and subsequently have the option of moving back into college for their final year, usually via a ballot system. The colleges provide most of the pastoral care and social centre of students with each running a college tutorial system, along with junior common rooms (JCRs) running events, providing representation and supporting societies for undergraduate members, middle common rooms (MCRs) for postgraduate students and senior common rooms (SCRs) for college officers, fellows and tutors. JCRs and MCRs are run by executive committees, usually headed by a president although some colleges use other titles.

Each college has a unique identity and a variety of facilities for students ranging from computer rooms and libraries to tennis courts and gyms. Most colleges have their own sports teams and compete in the collegiate leagues (such as Durham College Rowing) and may also have their own theatre and music societies, which operate in parallel to the university-level sports teams and organisations.

=== Student organisations ===
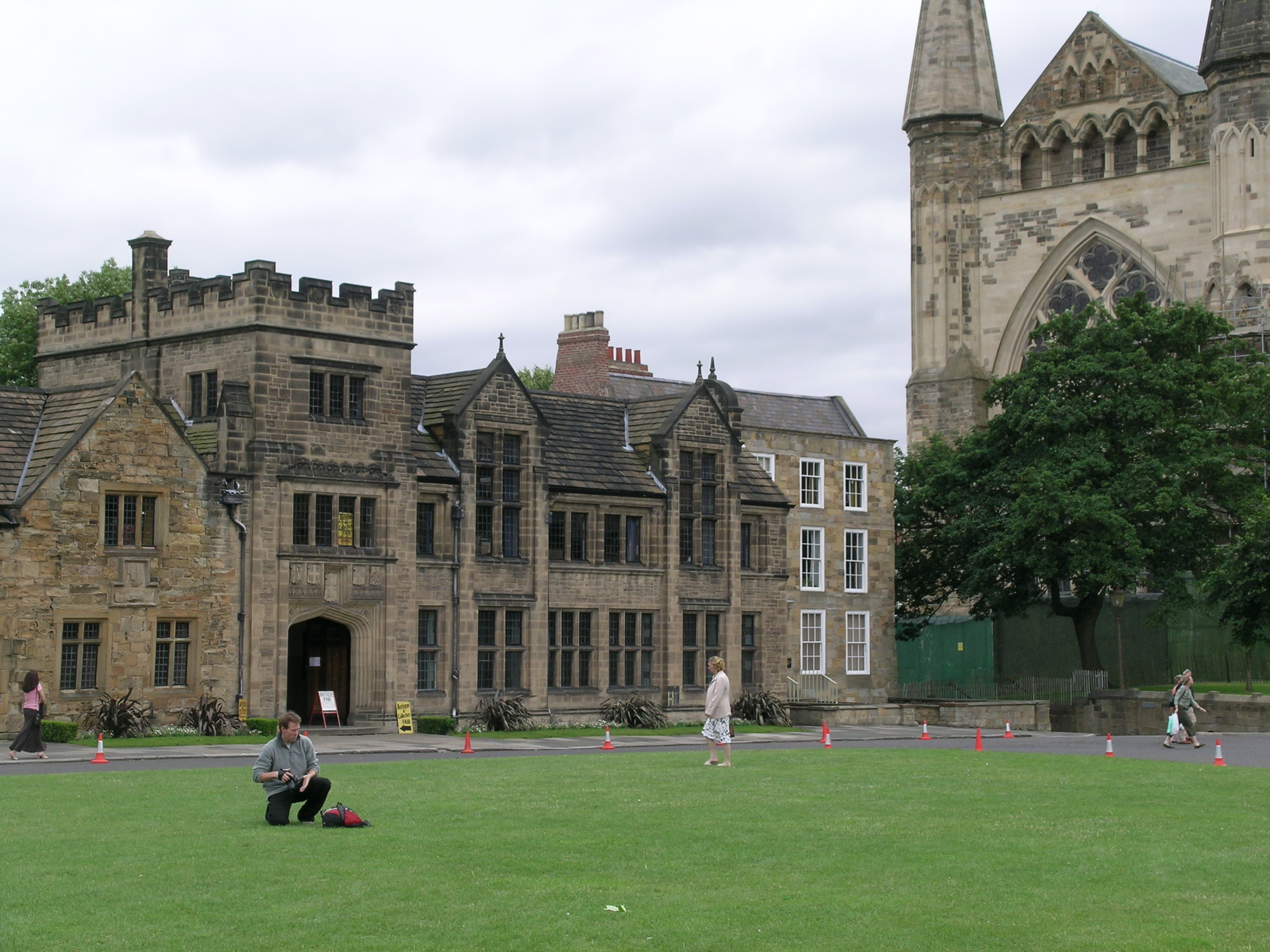
The Durham Union Society is the university's largest student society

There are more than 300 student clubs and organisations at Durham, covering a wide range of interests. Durham Students' Union (DSU) charters and provides most of the funding for these organisations. The Durham Union Society, founded in 1842 as Durham's Student Debating & Union Society, claims to be the largest independent student society in Durham, and hosts weekly debates and addresses from invited guests. The Durham University History Society is the oldest academic society at the university, founded in 1926.

=== Diversity and inclusion ===
HESA Student Body Composition (2024/25)
Domicile and Ethnicity	Total
British White (Note: Not be confused solely with White British)	56%
British Ethnic Minorities (Note: Includes those who indicate that they identify as Asian, Black, Mixed Heritage, Arab or any other ethnicity except White.)	11%
International EU	2%
International Non-EU	30%
Undergraduate Widening Participation Indicators
Female	53%
Private School	38%
Low Participation Areas (Note: Calculated from the Polar4 measure, using Quintile1, in England and Wales. Calculated from the Scottish Index of Multiple Deprivation (SIMD) measure, using SIMD20, in Scotland.)	9%

Black, Asian, Minority and Ethnic (BAME) students made up 32.6% of full-time Durham students in 2019/20, although students who classified themselves as 'black' numbered only 382 out of 18,430 full-time students (2.07%). A 2018 article for The Tab said that the low representation of black students meant that support structures for many young, vulnerable, black students were non-existent.

Incidents of racism, sexism and social elitism have been reported at Durham University. The university has stated that they condemn all racism and hate crime. The university established an independent commission, the Durham Commission on Respect, Values and Behaviours, in October 2018. The report of this commission was published in July 2020, highlighting that there were multiple problems with bullying, discrimination and a lack of diversity, and that many students came to the university with a "sense of entitlement". The report also found that the lack of diversity was "at the root of a number of discriminatory and exclusionary behaviours", including racism, sexism, and disrespect of working class students. The commission made 20 recommendations, all of which were accepted by the university's management. However, incidents of classism continued to be reported in the national press in 2025, and a university survey found that being from the northeast or from a less well-off background contributed to students feeling excluded.

The university joined the Race Equality Charter in 2019 and received a bronze award in 2022. It launched an 'Inclusive Durham' framework in 2024 and in 2025 signed the Gypsies, Travellers, Roma, Showmen and Boaters into Higher Education Pledge and received an institutional Athena SWAN silver award (having held an institutional bronze award since 2018). The university has also been a Stonewall Diversity Champion since 2012.

=== Civic engagement ===
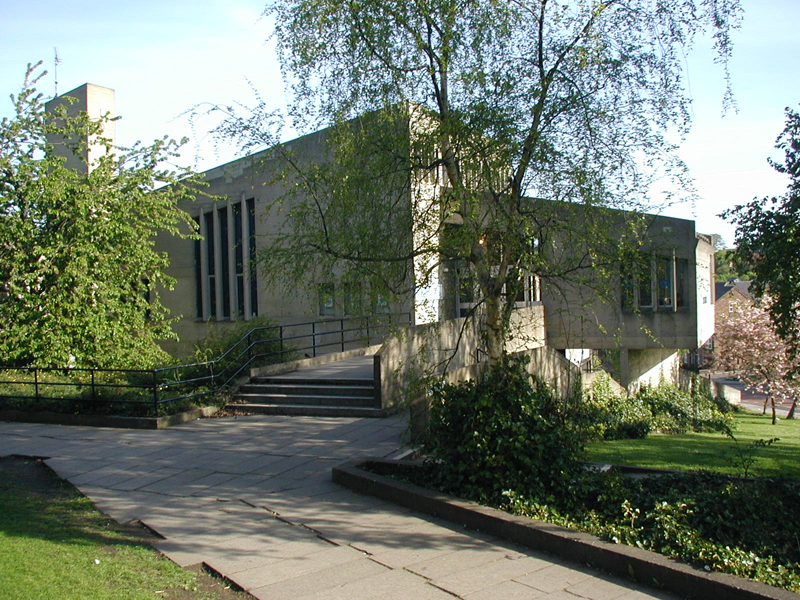
Dunelm House, home of the Durham Students' Union

Durham University Student Volunteering and Outreach (DUSVO; formally Student Community Action – SCA), was formed in 1989 and, As of 2020, oversaw more than 80 volunteer projects in Durham and the surrounding area, (including over 50 student-run projects), involving more than 2,000 students yearly. DUSVO runs projects through online portals for Staff and Students respectively. Staff at the university are permitted to spend up to 5 days (35 hours) volunteering during working time. It was awarded the Queen's Award for Voluntary Service – the UK's highest honour for volunteer groups – in 2020. The annual Durham University Volunteering Awards recognise individuals, teams, colleges and projects across several categories.

Durham University Charity Kommittee (or DUCK) is the university's student rag week and the fundraising arm of the Durham Students Union. Originally a week-long event, DUCK now has events raising money for local or national charities throughout the year. Activities and organisation happen both at the university level and within colleges. DUCK has previously organised expeditions to the Himalayas, Jordan and Mount Kilimanjaro and been involved in the university-run 'Project Sri Lanka' and 'Project Thailand'.

Team Durham Community Outreach is a sports community programme aimed at giving support and opportunities through the use of sport. The programme runs projects such as summer camps for children from the Youth Engagement Service and fostered backgrounds along with providing coaching at local schools as well as participating in sports in action.

=== Town and gown relations ===
The relationship between the university and the wider city has not always been free of tension. University plans for expansion have also faced local opposition, and there were claims when the 2017–2027 strategy was launched that the university had ignored concerns raised about its expansion at the Durham University Residents' Forum.

The university formed a Community Response Team in 2020 to support Durham Constabulary during Covid-19. This now responds to complaints of anti-social noise at student properties between 9:30pm and 3:30am, via the Police 101 non-emergency contact number, and also has patrols in student areas. The university also has two Student Community Wardens, intended to provide guidance to students living out of college, to represent students on the Durham University Residents' Forum, and to liaise with college common rooms, Durham Students' Union, Police University Liaison and council Neighbourhood Wardens.

Durham University and Durham County Council are both members of the International Town & Gown Association.

=== Student media ===
Palatinate, Durham's independent student-run fortnightly newspaper, has been continually published since 1948. Notable former editors include George Alagiah, Hunter Davies, Piers Merchant, Sir Timothy Laurence, Jeremy Vine and Harold Evans. Durham's student television station (PalTV) is a section of Palatinate and won Broadcaster of the Year at the National Student Television Association awards in 2022, 2023 and 2024.

Purple Radio is Durham's student radio station. It broadcasts live from the DSU 24 hours a day during term time. The station has existed since the 1980s and is a recognised DSU society. Two daily news bulletins are broadcast every weekday, as well as a Breakfast Show and an Evening Show.

The Bubble, founded in 2010, is an online magazine based at the university covering various subjects, including student and university news.

The Tab established a Durham edition in 2012, as part of its initial launch as a national student paper.

=== Sports teams ===
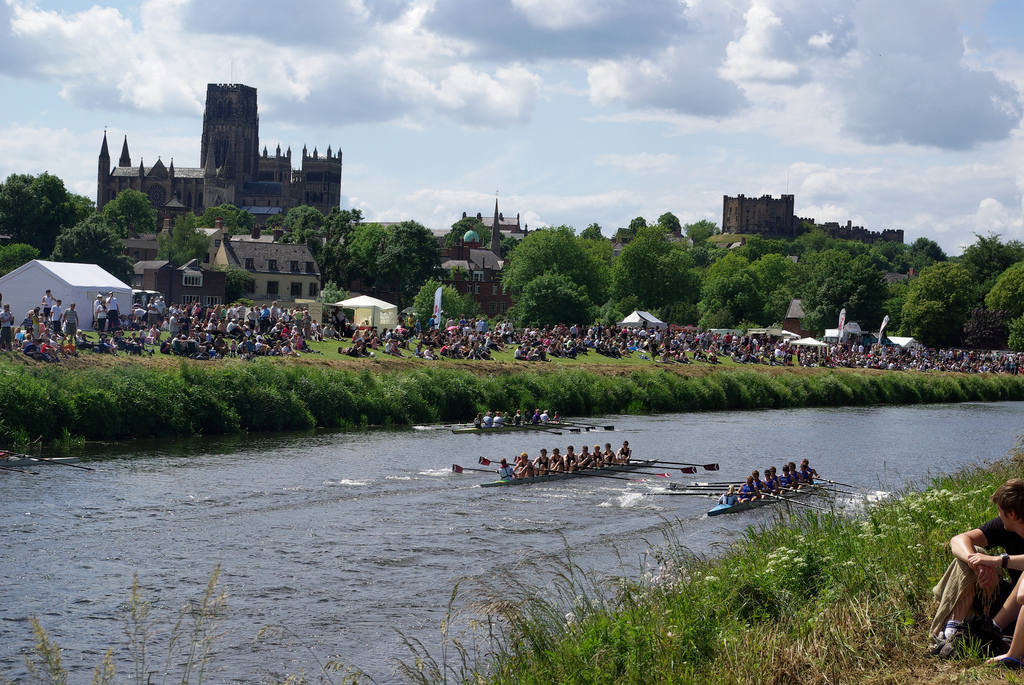
University College Boat Club and Newcastle University racing at Durham Regatta

Sport at Durham is a key aspect of student life with the vast majority of students regularly taking part at both a university and college level. It has twice been named Times and Sunday Times Sports University of the Year, in 2015 and 2023. As of 2018, the university caters for more than 50 different sports, organised under the umbrella of Team Durham, with extensive sports facilities at the Maiden Castle sports centre and the Racecourse.

The university is recognised as a Centre of Cricketing Excellence, as a British Rowing Performance Centre, and as a Lawn Tennis Association University Partner. It is also a Football Association Football Accredited University, with the highest 3* rating.

Durham has been in the top three across all sports in the British Universities & Colleges Sport (BUCS) table since 2011/12. In 2023/24, it won 13 BUCS national championships across 11 sports.

Durham University Boat Club has a good record at the BUCS Regatta, having won the title for ten consecutive years (2004–2013) before coming second in 2014, then regaining the title in 2015 and again in 2023. It also competes in Durham Regatta and the Boat Race of the North against Newcastle University, which ran 1997 – 2010 and was revived in 2015.

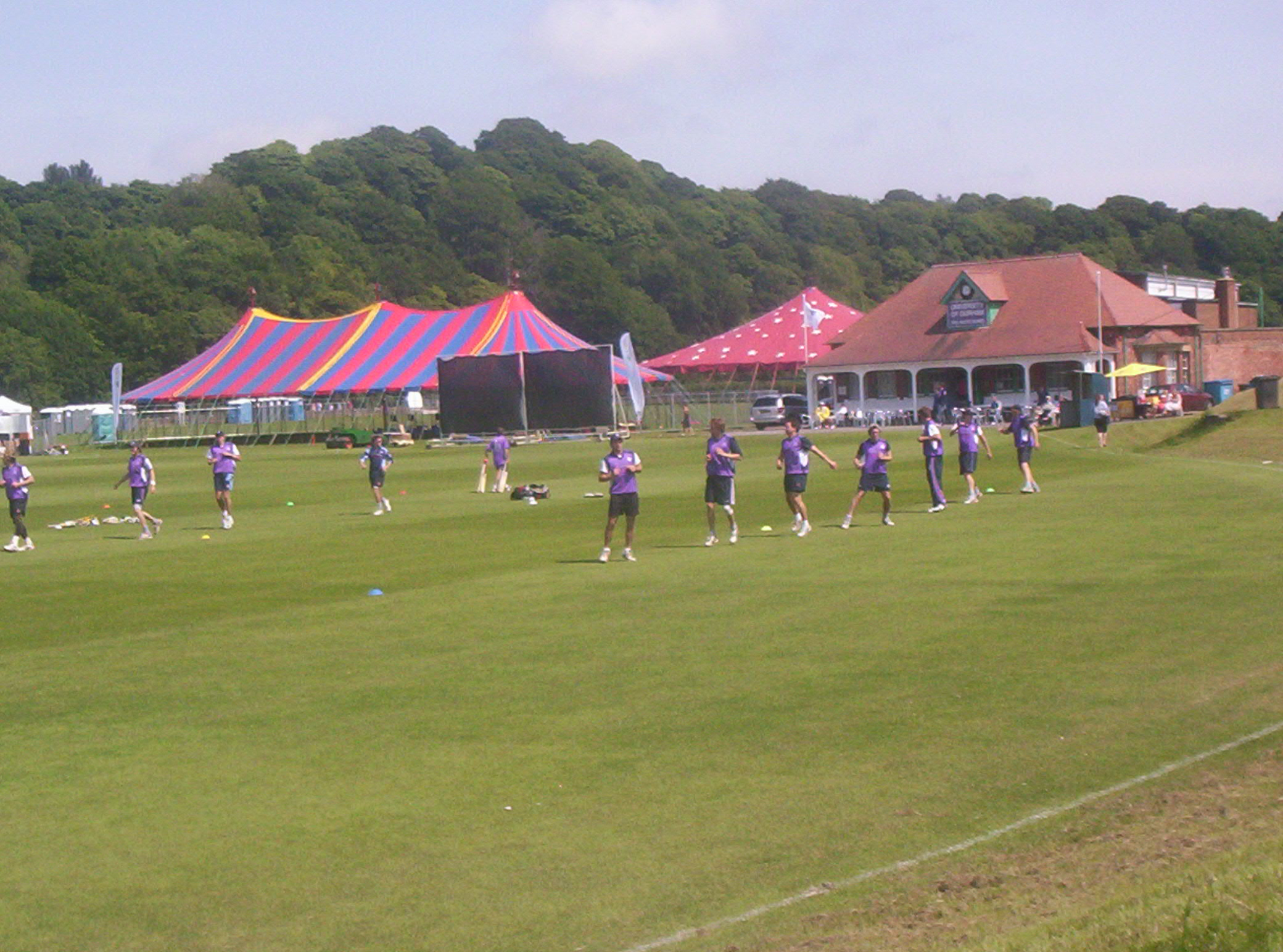
The Racecourse is one of the university's main sites for sporting facilities

Durham colleges compete with colleges from the University of York in the annual College Varsity tournament held since 2014. Since its inception, Durham and York have both won the tournament six times. Durham's BUCS matches against Loughborough University have been described as the 'BUCS Varsity', and a varsity competition between Durham colleges and Loughborough halls of residence has been held since 2015/16.

Palatinates (named after the colour associated with the university) are the university's sporting colours, given to athletes who demonstrate a very high standard (such as international representation) in their sport. Earning a full palatinate has been described by the university as a 'notoriously difficult' achievement. In 2022 just 12 student athletes received the full award, with a further 53 earning a half-palatinate.

Esports are included in Team Durham through Durham University Esports and Gaming (DUEG) as part of Team Durham. DUEG participates in 12 games, across National Student Esports (NSE) and National University Esports League (NUEL) tournaments.

=== Music and drama ===
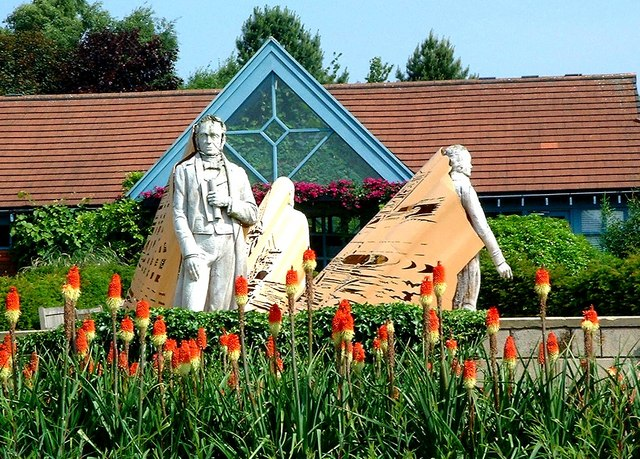
Durham University Botanic Garden

The central body for theatre at the university is Durham Student Theatre (DST), with 33 student-run theatre societies as of 2024, including university-wide companies, college-based companies and two Durham Students' Union theatre societies. These perform in the university's Assembly Rooms Theatre, in college venues, and in other venues around Durham, as well as at the Durham Drama Festival, the Durham Fringe Festival and the Edinburgh Fringe Festival.

Since 1975, the university has played host to the Durham Drama Festival which celebrates new theatrical and dramatic material written by Durham students.

The Durham Revue is the university's sketch comedy group. Tracing its roots back to the early 1950s, and known under its current name since 1988, the group consists of six writer-performers (auditioned, interviewed and chosen each Michaelmas Term) and produces a series of shows each year. The group performs annually with Cambridge University's Footlights and Oxford University's The Oxford Revue, as well as at the Edinburgh Fringe Festival.

The Durham Cathedral Choir offers choral scholarships to male and female students, and several of the colleges (University, Hatfield, Hild Bede, St John's, St Chad's, St Cuthbert's, Grey and St Mary's) also offer organ and/or choral scholarships, as does the Catholic Chaplaincy. Northern Lights, Durham's student a cappella group, won the UK finals of the International Championship of Collegiate A Cappella in 2023, 2024 and 2025 going on to compete in the world finals, where they ranked third in 2025.

Durham is also home to the oldest Gamelan slendro set in the UK with an active community group and an artist in residence. The instruments are currently housed in the Grade II listed Durham University Observatory. The Durham Gamelan Society has performed at several major public events such as the Gong Festivals 2011 & 2012 and at the Gamelan Lokananta all night wayang kulit in celebration of York University's Gamelan Sekar Petak 30th anniversary in 2012.

=== Leadership and personal development ===
Students can participate in several personal development courses offered by the university. The Durham Leadership framework aims to develop student leaders and includes online resources, an Emerging Leadership Program and a year-long Leadership Academy. The Laidlaw Research and Leadership Program, which is provided at multiple universities as part of the Laidlaw Foundation, provides funding for 25 Durham Undergraduates. The program comprises a 6-week summer research project, a leadership training retreat, a 6-week summer 'leadership-in-action experience' and ethical masterclass. The university also offers the Durham Inspired Award for skills and experience gained outside of formal academic programmes.

== Alumni ==
=== Societies ===
Durham alumni are active through organisations and events such as the annual reunions, dinners and balls. By 2024 there were over 230,000 Durham graduates in the Durham alumni community. Every November, "Dunelm Days" events are held by alumni groups around the world.

The umbrella organisation for Durham University alumni is Dunelm, which offers a range of events and dedicated alumni services. Dunelm can trace its roots to the Durham University Society, formed in 1921, the Society of Dunelmians in 1905 and the Durham University Association in 1866. Dunelm USA, formerly the North American Foundation for the University of Durham or NAFUD, is a philanthropic body in the United States that hosts alumni events and fundraises for Durham-related projects.

A masonic lodge, University of Durham Lodge no. 3030, was founded in 1904 for university alumni and meets at Freemasons' Hall in Covent Garden.

=== Notable people ===
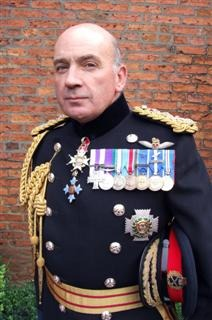
Richard Dannatt, Chief of the General Staff

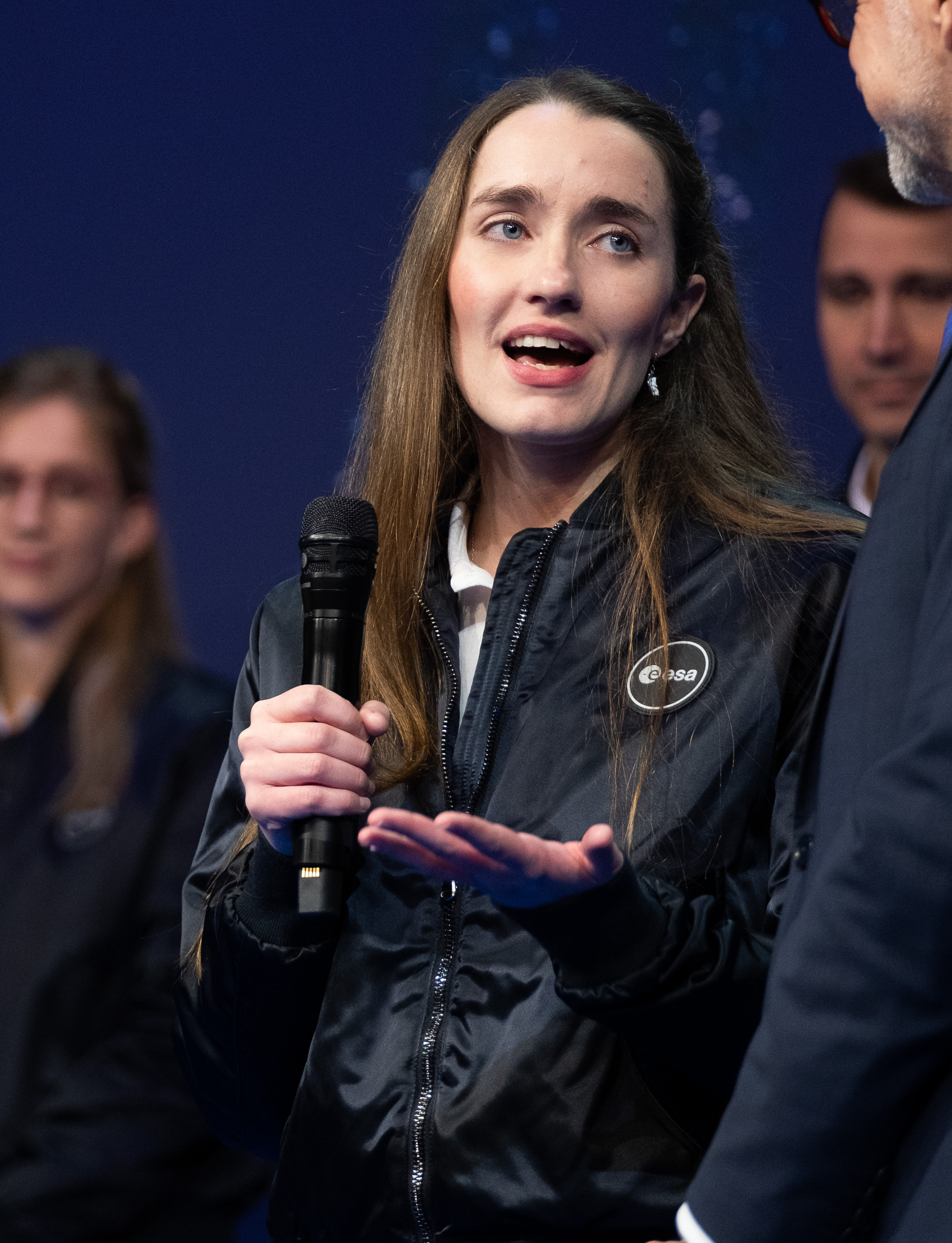
Rosemary Coogan, British ESA astronaut

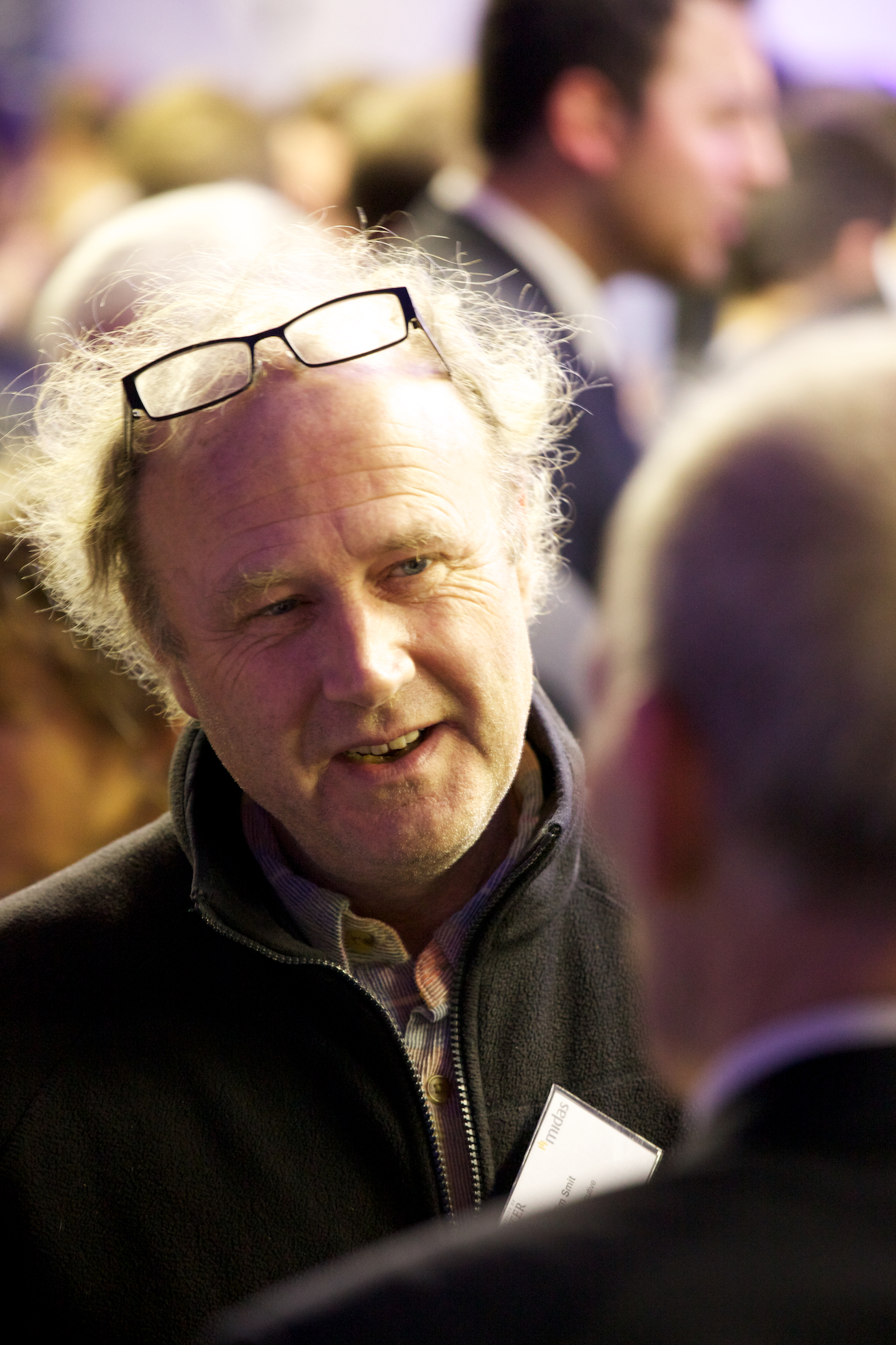
Tim Smit, founder of the Eden Project

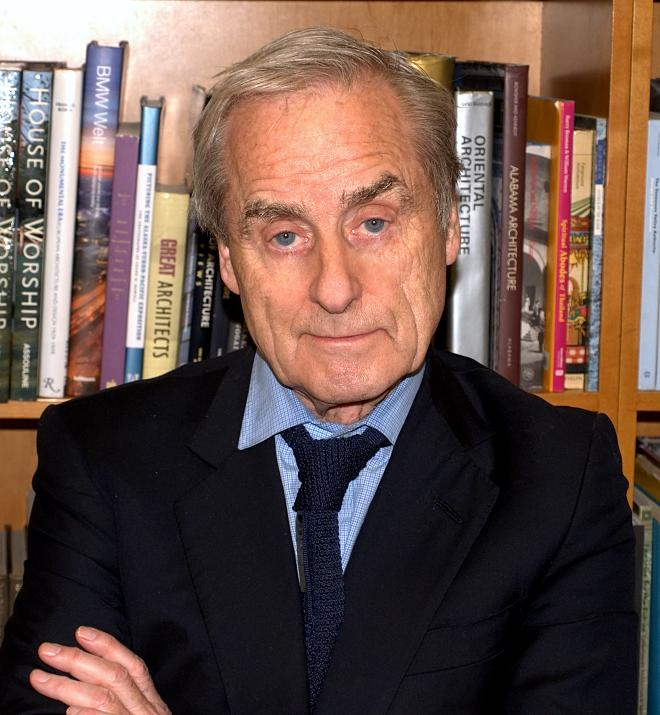
Harold Evans, editor of The Times and The Sunday Times

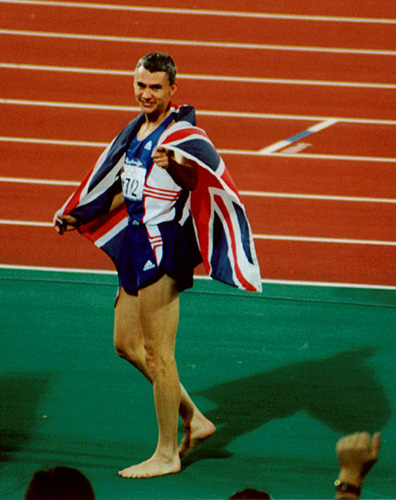
Jonathan Edwards, Olympic gold medallist

In politics, 14 Durham alumni and former staff were elected to the UK parliament in the 2024 general election (eight Labour, two Conservative, two Liberal Democrats, one Green and one independent). Alumni who have held significant positions in the British government have included Edward Shortt, Home Secretary, and Mo Mowlam, Secretary of State for Northern Ireland at the time of the Good Friday Peace Agreement. Notable figures in law have included two Supreme Court justices, Anthony Hughes and Jill Black, and a Lord Chancellor, Robert Buckland. Alumni and staff in religion have included two archbishops of Canterbury, Michael Ramsey and Justin Welby, as well as Libby Lane, the first woman bishop in the Church of England. Durham graduates in the military have included two chiefs of the general staff (professional heads of the British Army), Richard Dannatt and Mark Carleton-Smith.

In science, Durham graduates include cosmologist John D. Barrow, winner of the Templeton Prize; particle physicist George Rochester, co-discoverer of the kaon; geophysicist and statistician Harold Jeffreys, winner of the Royal Society's Copley Medal; geologist Kingsley Charles Dunham, director of the British Geological Survey; and astrophysicist Rosemary Coogan, European Space Agency astronaut. Alumni in business have included Richard Adams, fair trade pioneer and founder of Traidcraft, and Tim Smit, co-founder of the Eden Project. Media figures have included Harold Evans, editor of The Sunday Times and The Times; Biddy Baxter, producer of Blue Peter; and television presenters George Alagiah, Gabby Logan and Jeremy Vine. Noted writers include Edward Bradley, author of The Adventures of Mr. Verdant Green, and Hunter Davies, author of The Beatles: The Authorised Biography.

In sports, Durham has produced more professional athletes than any other British university. Sporting alumni have include England rugby captains Will Carling and Phil de Glanville, England cricket captains Nasser Hussain and Andrew Strauss, and Olympic gold medallists Jonathan Edwards and Sophie Hosking.

== See also ==
- Armorial of UK universities
- Common Awards
- Historical list of Durham University Colleges
- List of modern universities in Europe (1801–1945)
- List of UK universities
- Doxbridge
