= Durham Energy Institute =

Research institute at Durham University, England

Durham Energy Institute (DEI) is a research institute located within Durham University, England. It was launched in September 2009 for research in the fields of energy technology and society.

== Background ==
The current Executive Director is Professor Jon Gluyas.

DEI researches Microalgae biofuels, Cellulosic Crops, photovoltaics, clean energy generation, Geo-Energy, Energy and Society, Economics, Regulation, Policy, Fusion Energy, and Energy Decarbonisation.

Its board of advisors includes Ian Burdon, Benj Sykes from DONG Energy, John Loughhead from UKERC, Helen Moss from IBM and Andrew Mill from Narec.

The Durham Centre for Doctoral Training in Energy forms an important and integral part of the DEI, offering an interdisciplinary postgraduate research training programme in energy.

The MSc Energy and Society is led by Durham University's Anthropology Department, in association with the Durham Energy Institute and its partner departments (including Engineering, Social Sciences and Humanities). Unique among Masters programmes, the course emphasizes the insights that the social sciences can offer to energy and development, and vice versa.

== See also ==
- Renewable energy
- Biofuels
- Carbon finance
- Energy and society
- Fracking
- Geothermal power
- Hydro power
- Microgeneration
- Smart grid
