= Department of Physics, Durham University =

Academic department of Durham University

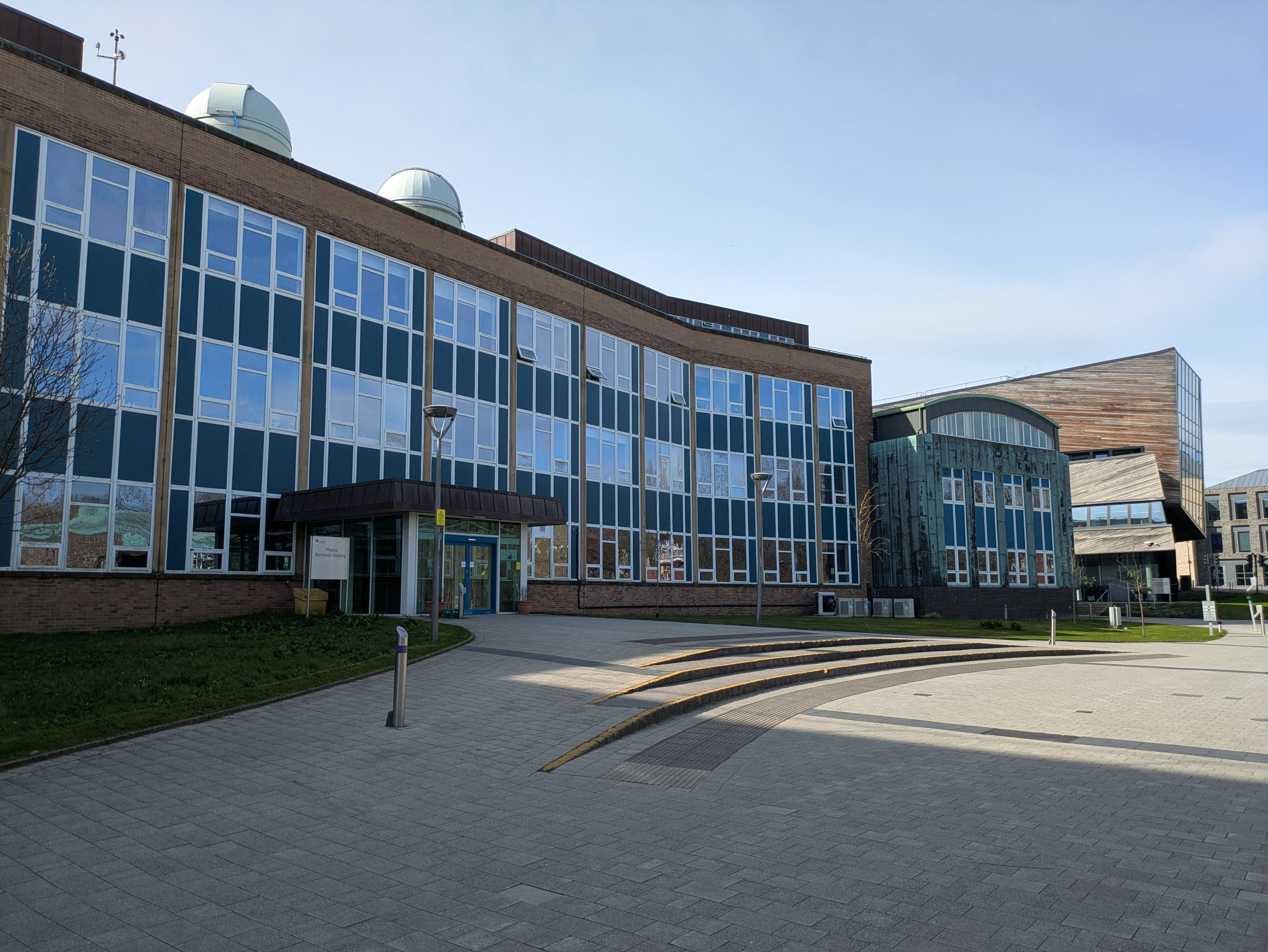
- Head of Department: Professor Paula Chadwick
- Academic staff: 78
- Doctoral students: 150
- Location: Durham, County Durham, England
- Campus: Science Site, Durham University
- Website: www.dur.ac.uk/physics

The Department of Physics at Durham University, located in Durham, England, is responsible for both undergraduate and postgraduate teaching as well as scientific research in physics and astronomy.

The department hosts the largest particle theory group in the United Kingdom. It is also noted for its research in astronomy and astrophysics, including one of the largest groups in Europe studying galaxy evolution.

Based on the Mountjoy site south of the River Wear, the department is home to two research institutes: the Institute for Particle Physics Phenomenology and the Institute for Computational Cosmology.

In the 2023 and 2024 editions of The Guardian university league tables, the department was ranked second for physics in the United Kingdom.

== Research ==
Research is organised into six main groups: Astronomy, Quantum Light and Matter (QLM), the Centre for Advanced Instrumentation (CfAI), Condensed Matter Physics (CMP), the Institute for Particle Physics Phenomenology (IPPP) and Physics Education and Scholarship (PhES).

The Department of Physics hosts several other major research centres, including the Institute for Computational Cosmology (ICC) and the Centre for Extragalactic Astronomy (CEA) which together along with the CfAI form the Durham Astronomy Research Cluster. These centres specialise respectively in theoretical cosmology, observational astronomy, and astronomical instrumentation.

Other bodies include the Centre for Materials Physics; the Centre for Particle Theory, a collaboration with the Department of Mathematical Sciences; and the Durham X-Ray Centre (XRDuR), which provides advanced X-ray analysis facilities. The department also operates the GJ Russell Microscopy Facility for high-resolution electron microscopy.

The department is also a partner in the Joint Quantum Centre (JQC), founded in 2012 with Newcastle University. Its Quantum Light and Matter (QLM) group investigates the quantum properties of atoms, molecules, and solids, with applications in quantum technology.

In 2020, Professor Charles Adams, founding director of the JQC, received the Holweck Medal and Prize for contributions to light–matter interactions with potential applications in quantum computing.

=== Assessment ===
The 2014 Research Excellence Framework considered 96% of research carried out within the department to be either 'internationally excellent quality' or 'world leading', while the remaining 4% was listed as 'internationally recognised' by the framework – a method for assessing quality of research at British universities. This assessment was maintained by the REF in 2021.

== Undergraduate study ==
Each year the department admits approximately 170 undergraduates for courses in Physics, Physics and Astronomy, and Theoretical Physics. Course structures are designed to offer flexibility, with both three-year BSc and four-year MPhys degrees available. The BSc is suggested for prospective undergraduates interested in physics as preparation for another career, while the MPhys is recommended for those looking for a research-related career.

Awards are offered by the department on an annual basis for outstanding academic performance, including the D A Wright Prize (for the best marks achieved by final honours candidates), and the J A Chalmers Prize (for the strongest research project by final honours candidates). Past recipients of the J A Chalmers Prize include Lincoln Wallen and Richard Massey.

=== Admissions ===
Entry requirements are high. As of 2019, a typical A-level offer demands grades of A*A*A, to includes Physics and Mathematics, and a typical offer for the IB Diploma is 38, to include 776 in higher level subjects.

== Graduate study ==
Taught postgraduate programmes include the MSc in Particles, Strings, and Cosmology and MSc in Scientific Computing and Data Analysis. The department also offers a MSc by Research in Physics (MScR) as preparation for further postgraduate study towards a PhD in physics.

=== Admissions ===
Applicants to these courses are required to have a good first or 2:1 UK honours degree (or the international equivalent) in Physics, Mathematics, or a related subject, with those interested in the MSc in Scientific Computing and Data Analysis also expected to possess 'profound programming knowledge' in both Python and C.

For entry to the PhD applicants are required to have achieved a first class honours degree, or at least a 2:1 integrated master's degree or a master's degree in an appropriate subject.

== Astronomy ==
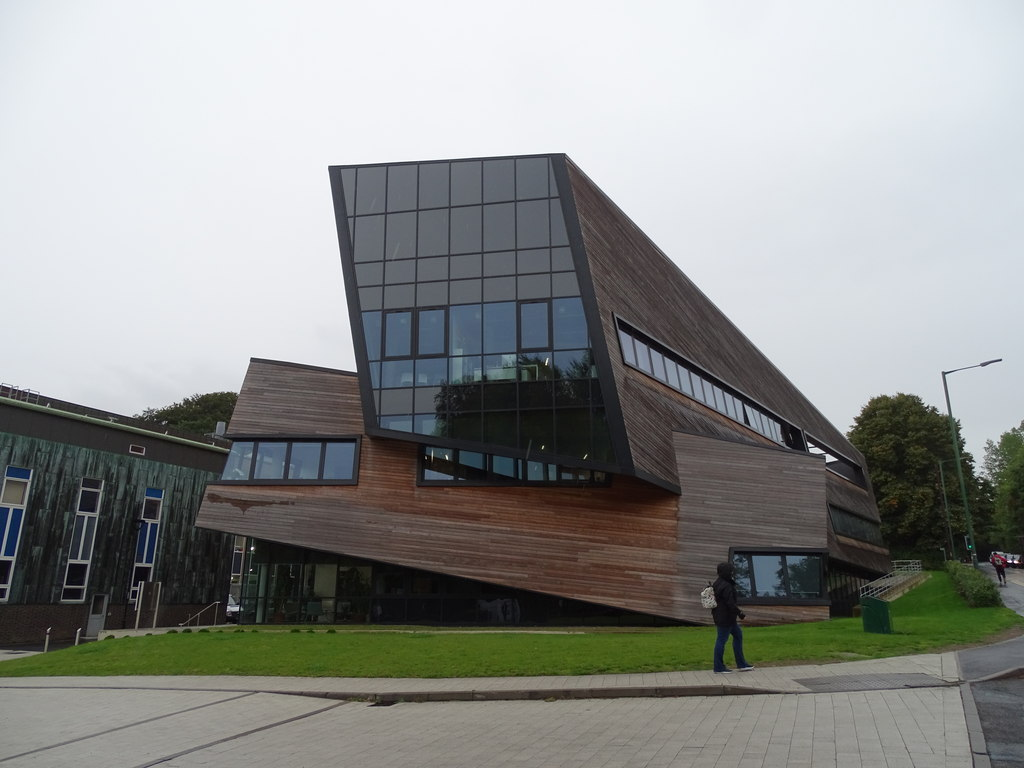
The Ogden Centre for Fundamental Physics

Astronomy within the department dates back to 1975. The scope of activity has grown substantially since then and it is now one of the largest astronomy groups in Europe. The Ogden Centre for Fundamental Physics building, designed by Studio Daniel Libeskind, opened in November 2016.

=== Reputation ===
In recent years the department has been singled out for the quality of its astronomical research. In 2008, Durham placed first in Europe and fourth in the world for research into astronomy and astrophysics over the decade 1998 to 2008, according to the Times Higher Education.

The Clarivate Analytics Highly Cited Researchers 2018 list placed Durham researchers first in the UK and second in Europe. David Alexander and Carlos Frenk were highlighted for their research, as were Adrian Jenkins and Tom Theuns.

In 2020 Frenk was made one of the Clarivate Citation Laureates in Physics (whose honourees are recognised for research judged to be 'of Nobel class') for his highly cited work on the evolution of the universe.

=== Centre for Extragalactic Astronomy ===
The Centre for Extragalactic Astronomy (CEA) was established in 2015 to consolidate and expand Durham's research in extragalactic astronomy. It succeeded the earlier Extragalactic Astronomy and Cosmology Group.

The CEA conducts observational and theoretical research into a range of topics within extragalactic astrophysics, including galaxy formation and evolution, large-scale astronomical surveys, active galactic nuclei (AGN), galaxy clusters, and the intergalactic medium.

The founding director of the CEA was Professor Ian Smail, with Professor David Alexander serving as director as of 2018.

== Ogden Professor of Fundamental Physics ==
The Ogden Professor of Fundamental Physics is a professorship or chair in the Department of Physics at Durham University. The chair is named after Sir Peter Ogden. The chair was established in 2001, following a benefaction from Ogden.

List of Ogden Professors

- Professor Carlos Frenk: 2001–present

== Staff ==
The current head of department is Paula Chadwick who succeeded Nigel Glover, a specialist in particle physics, who succeeded Simon Morris in 2017.

As of 2026, the department reports a staff of ~40 professors, 12 readers, 11 senior lecturers, 18 lecturers, 'about 100 post-doctoral researchers and fellows', and 150 PhD students.

Emeritus staff include, among others, Martyn Chamberlain, R. Keith Ellis, F. Richard Stephenson, and Brian Keith Tanner.

Notable staff include:

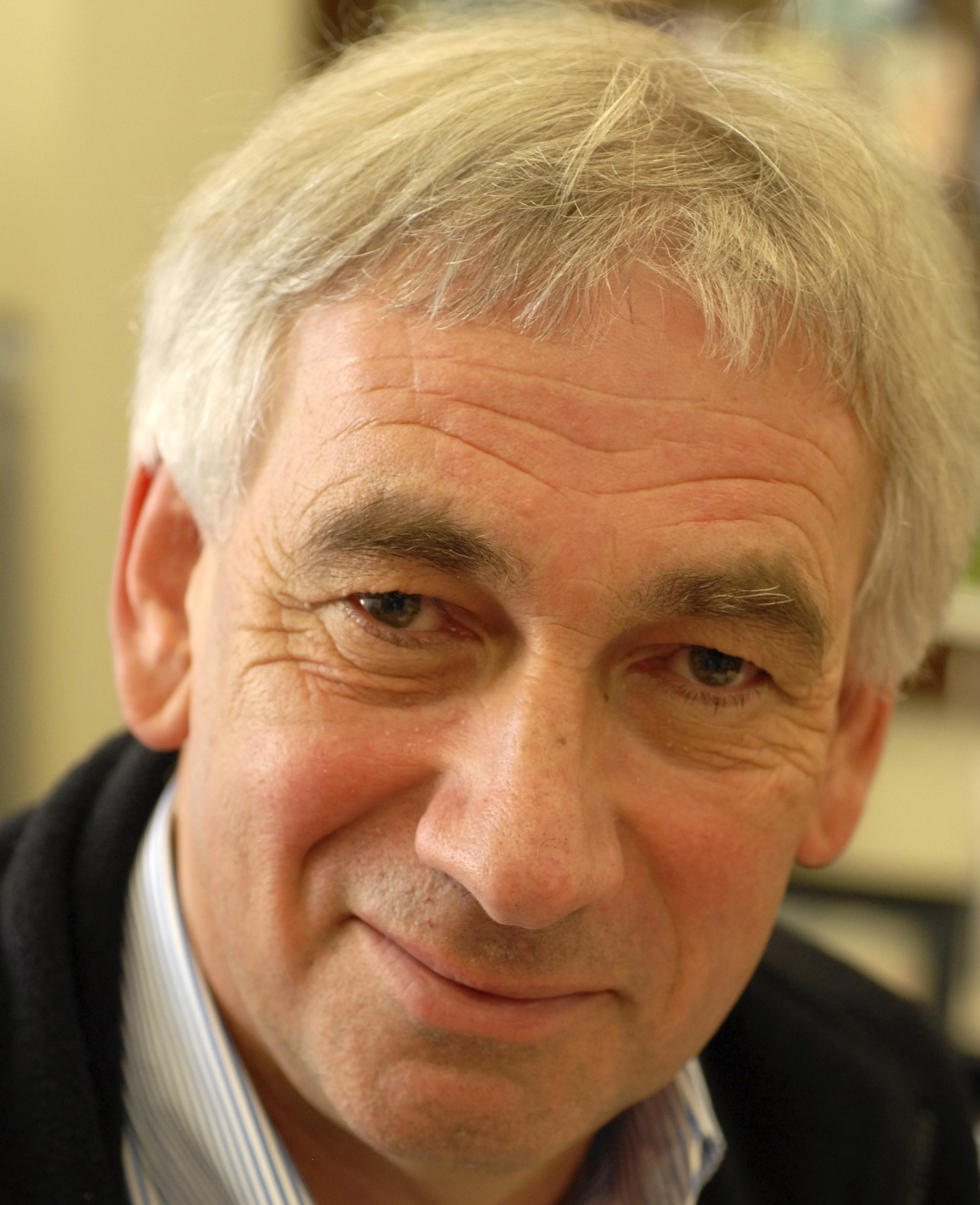
Richard Ellis, Professor (1985–1993)

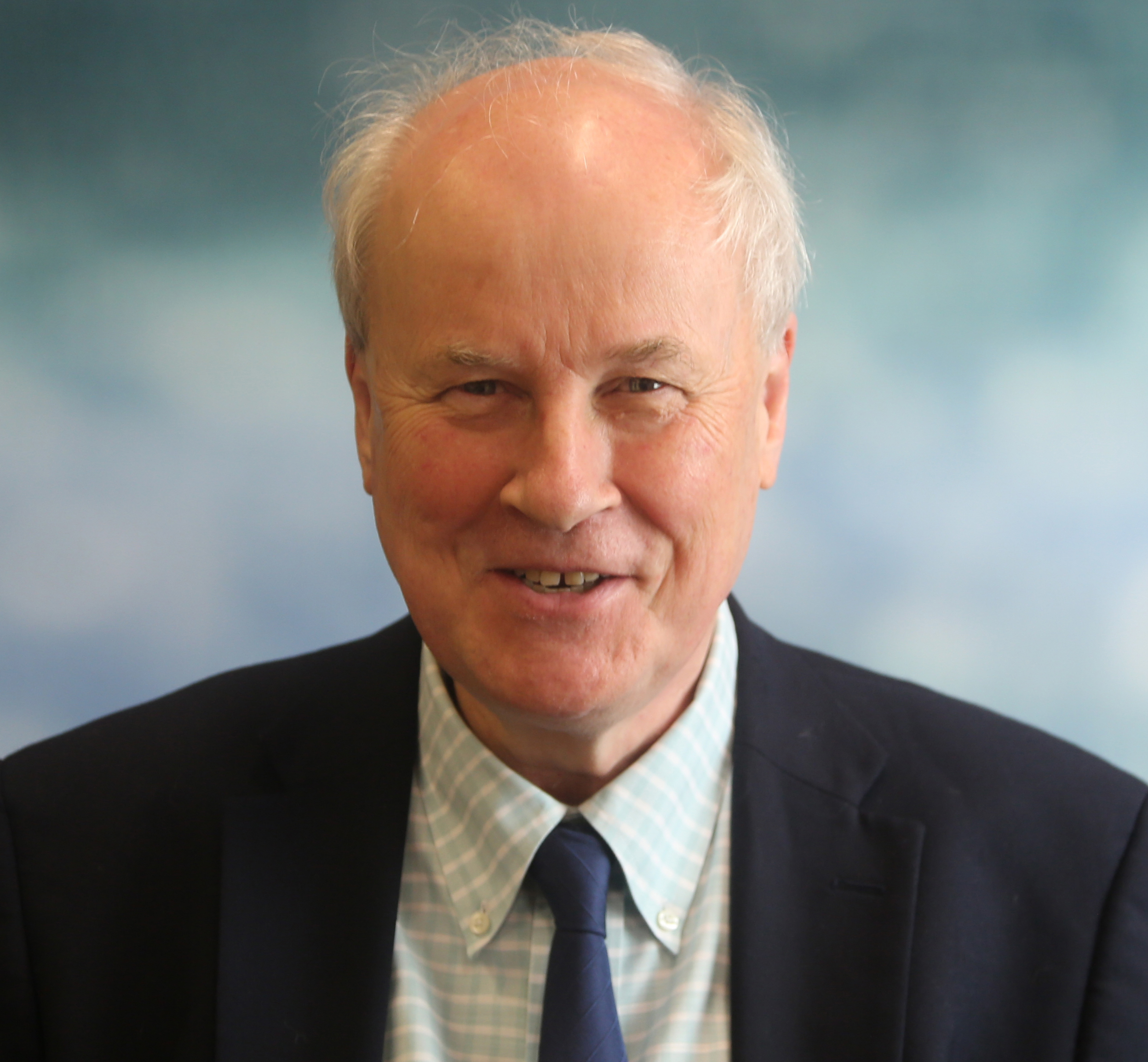
R. Keith Ellis, Director of Institute for Particle Physics Phenomenology (2015–2019)

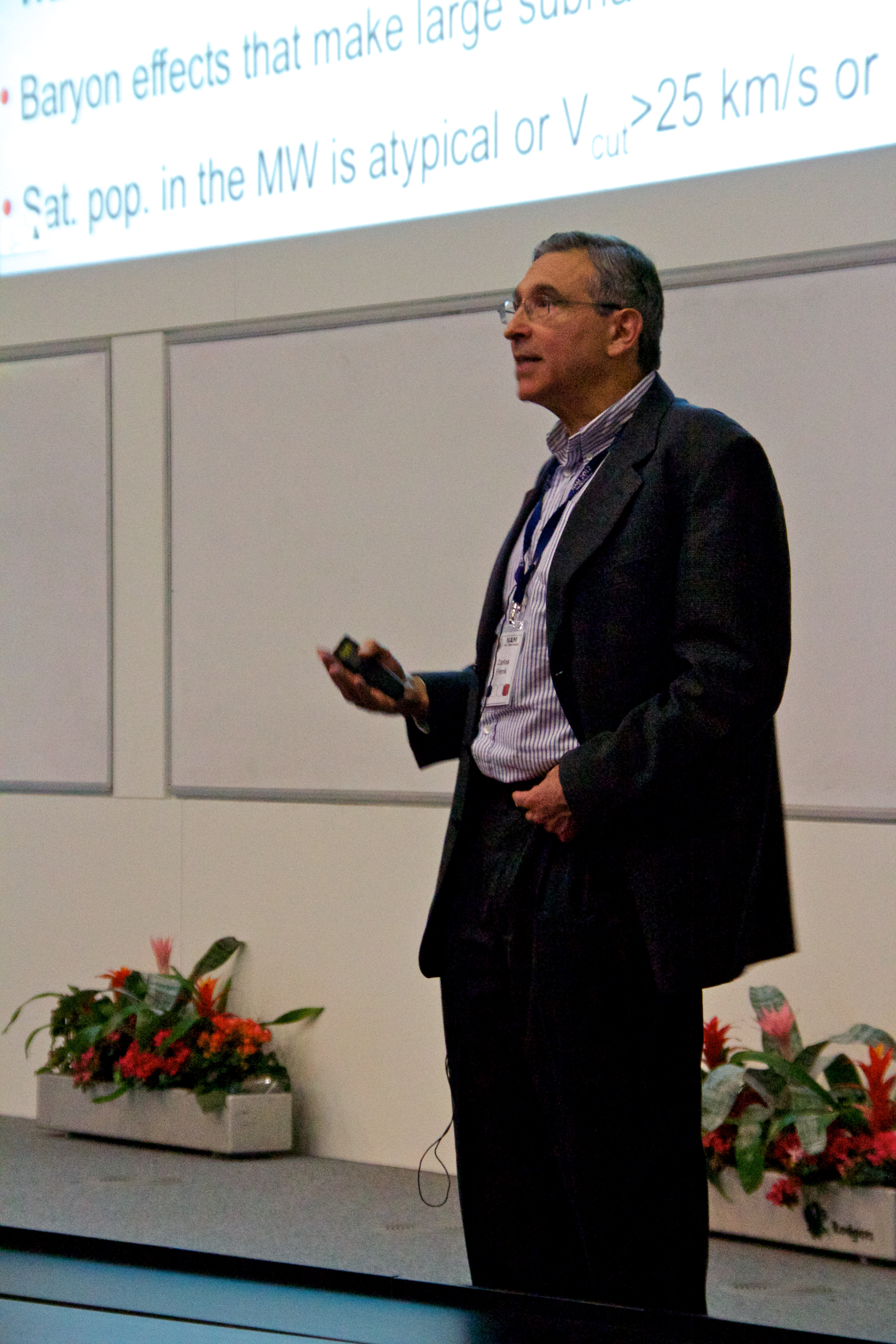
Carlos Frenk, Ogden Professor of Fundamental Physics

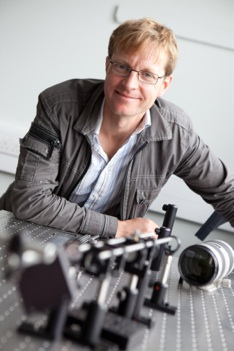
Gordon D. Love, Director of Education (Physics) (2012–2015)

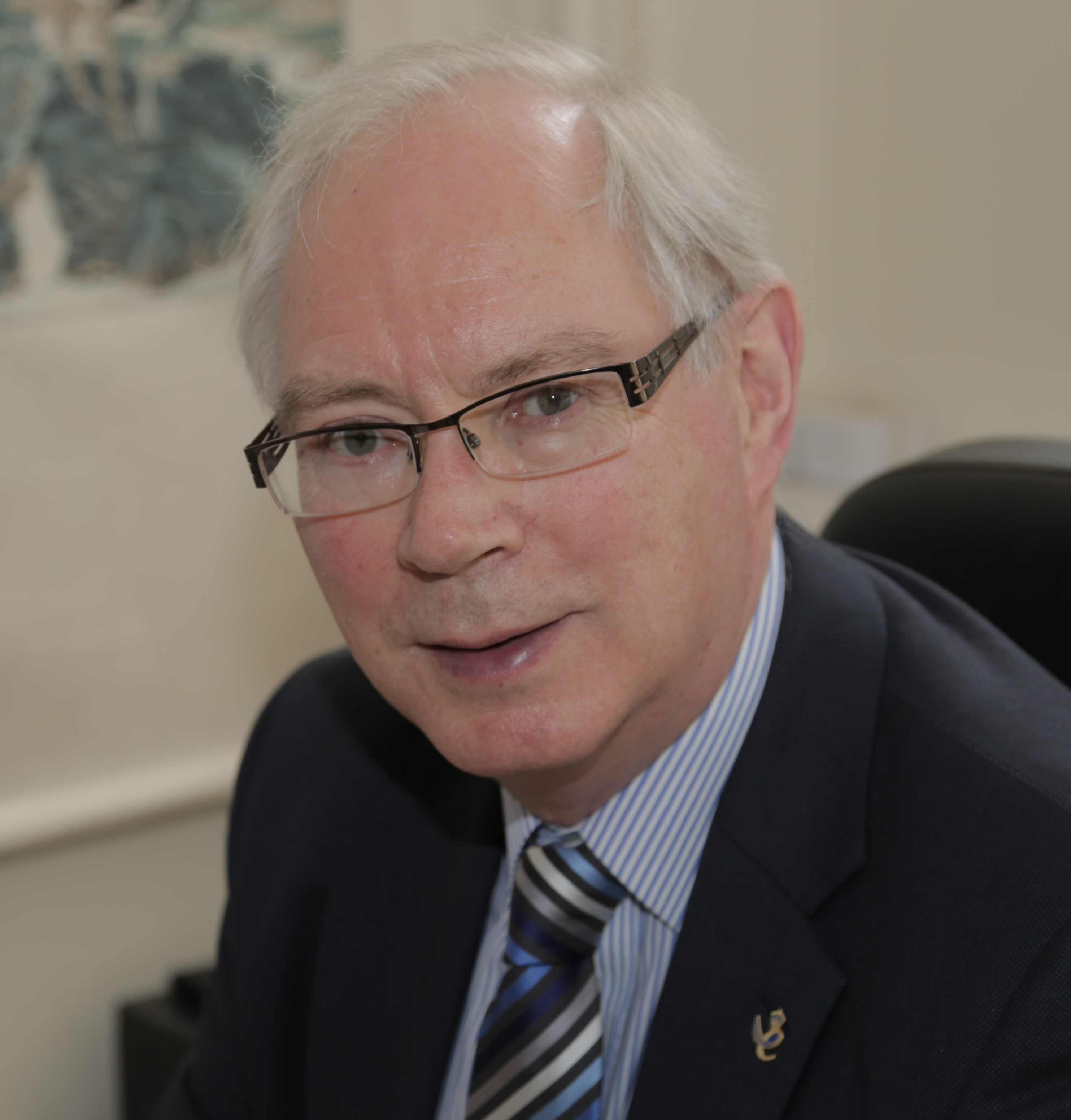
Brian Keith Tanner, Emeritus Professor of Physics

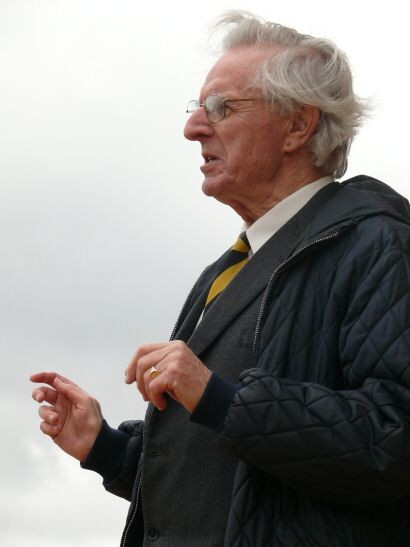
Arnold Wolfendale, Professor (1965–1992)

== Alumni ==
Notable alumni include:

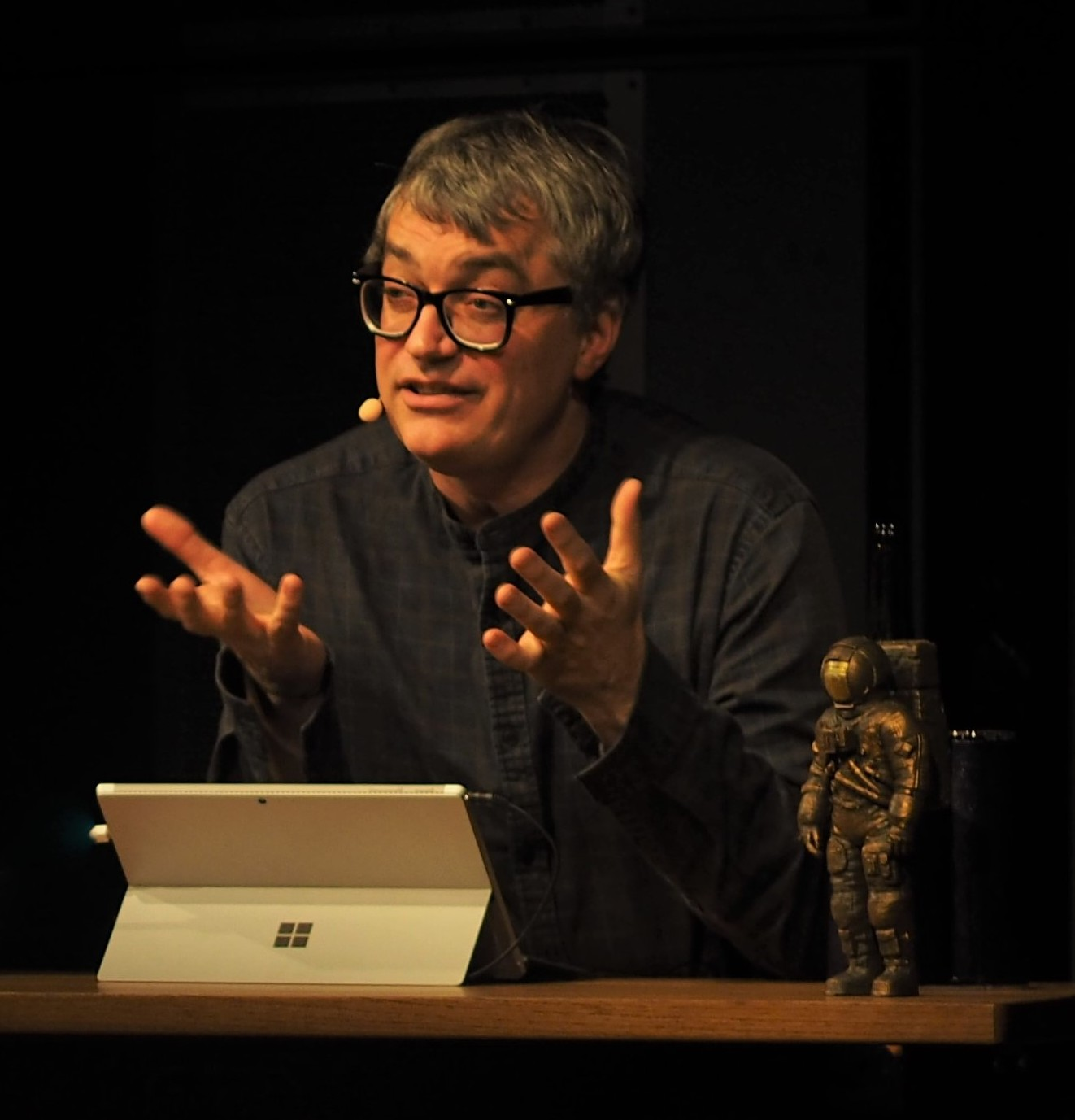
Ben Moore, PhD 1991

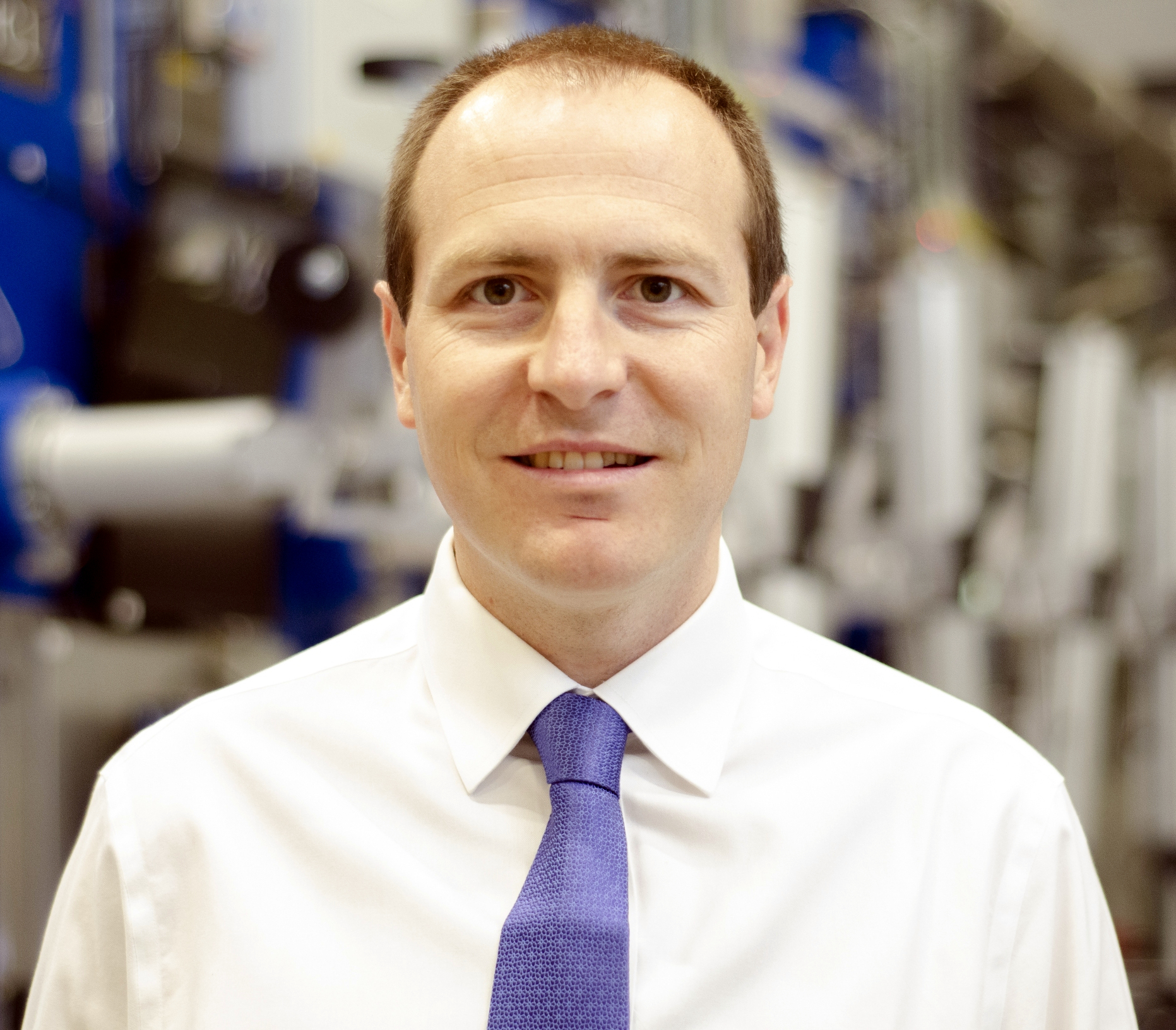
Ian Chapman, MSci 2004

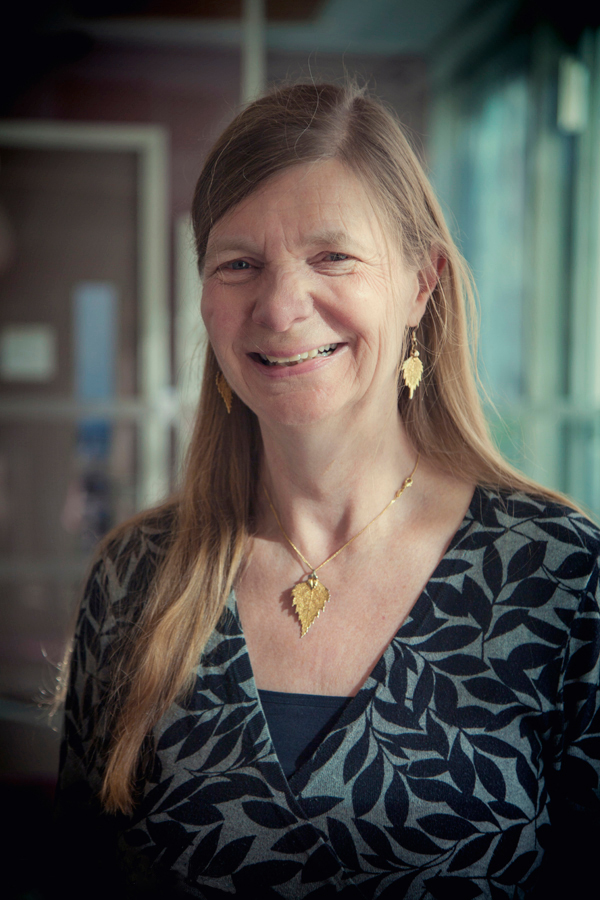
Elspeth Garman, BSc 1976

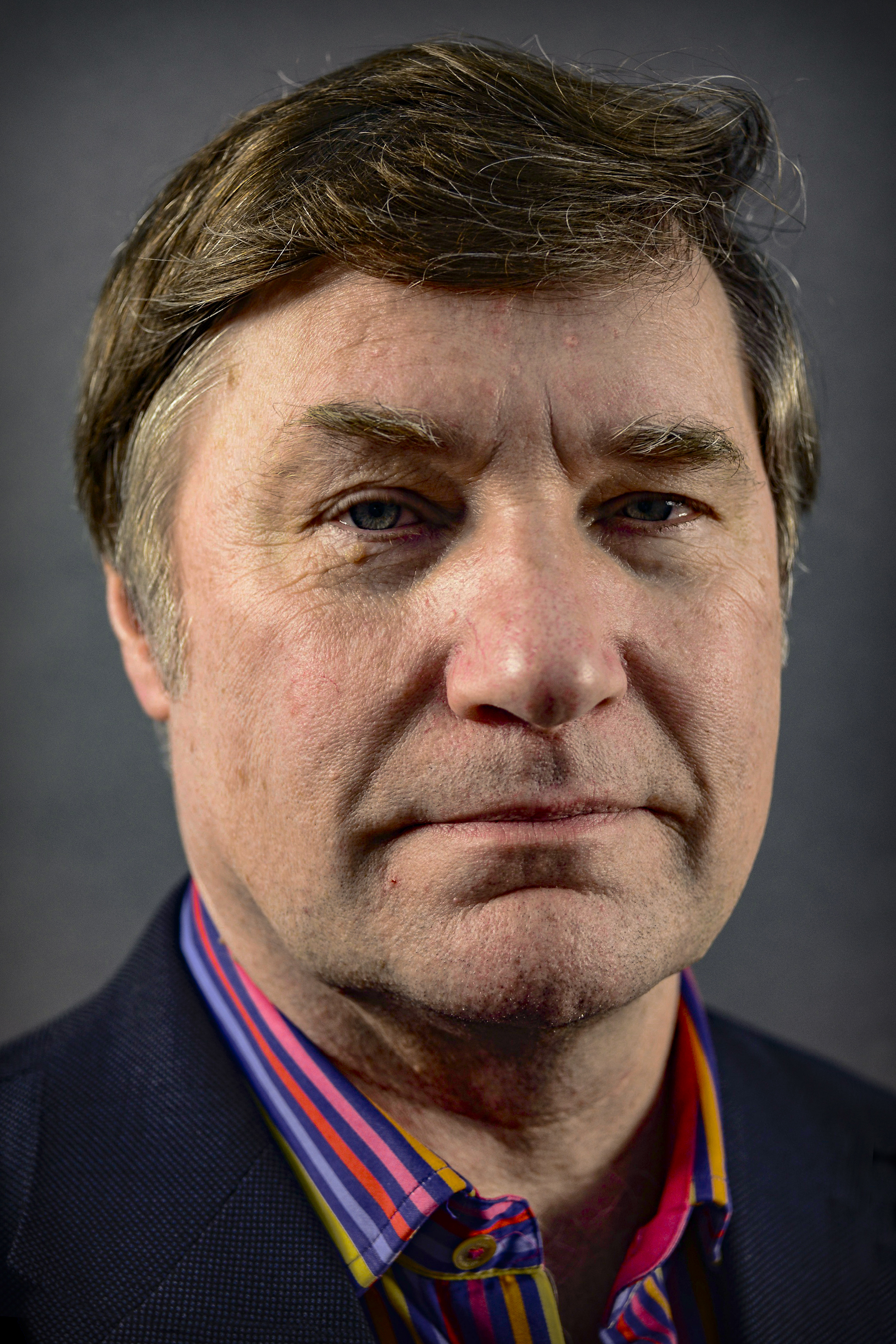
John D. Barrow, BSc 1974

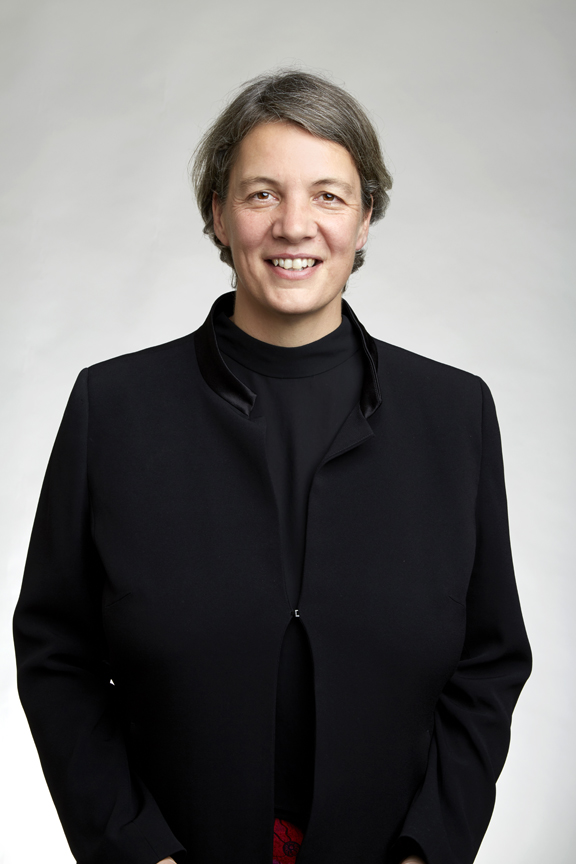
Michelle Simmons, BSc 1988
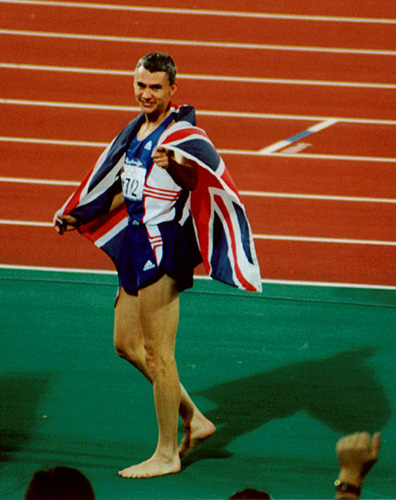
Jonathan Edwards, BSc 1987

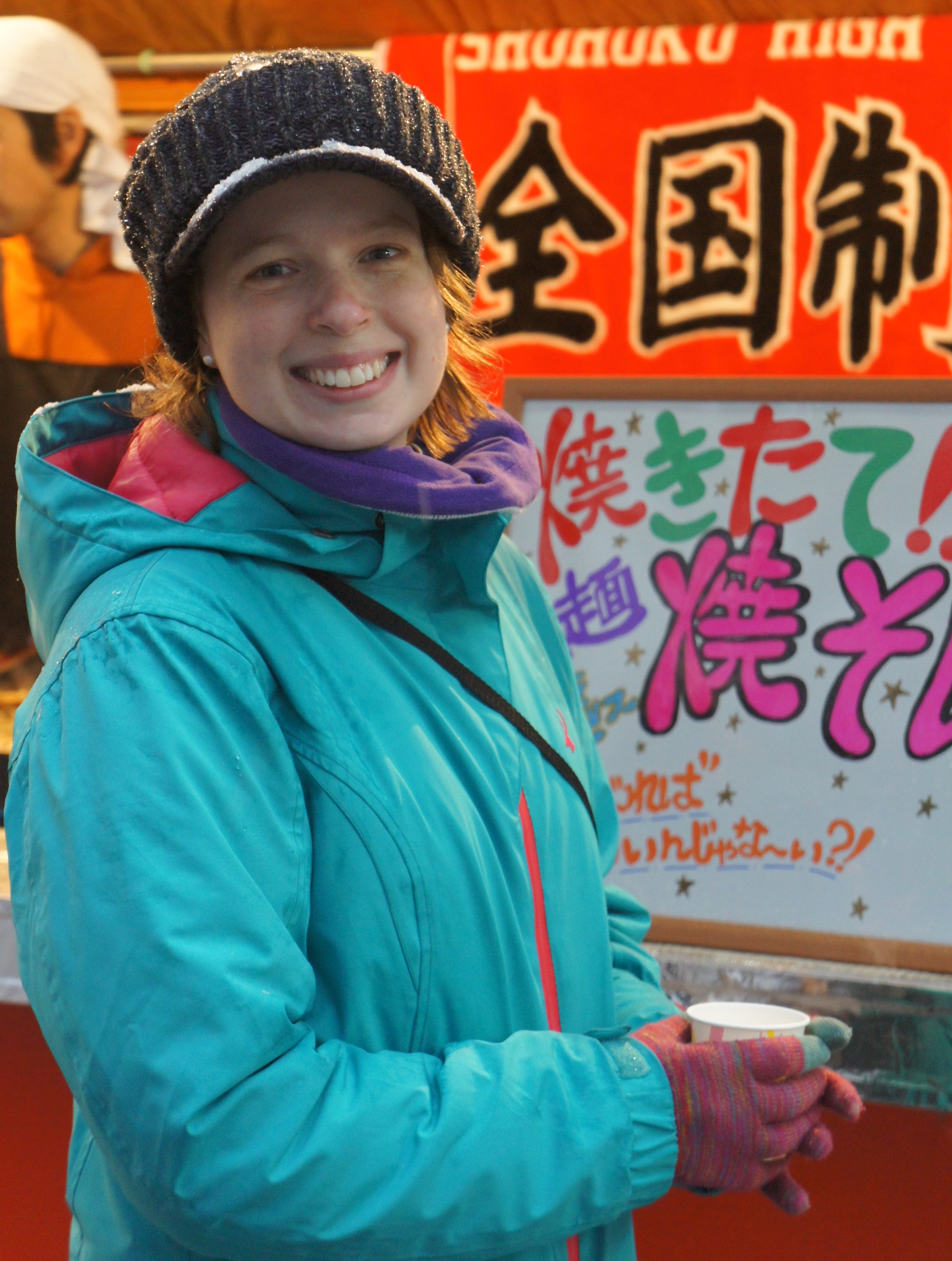
Elizabeth J. Tasker, MSci 2002

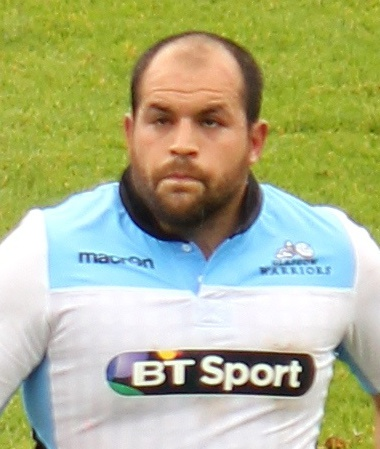
Ed Kalman, BSc 2004

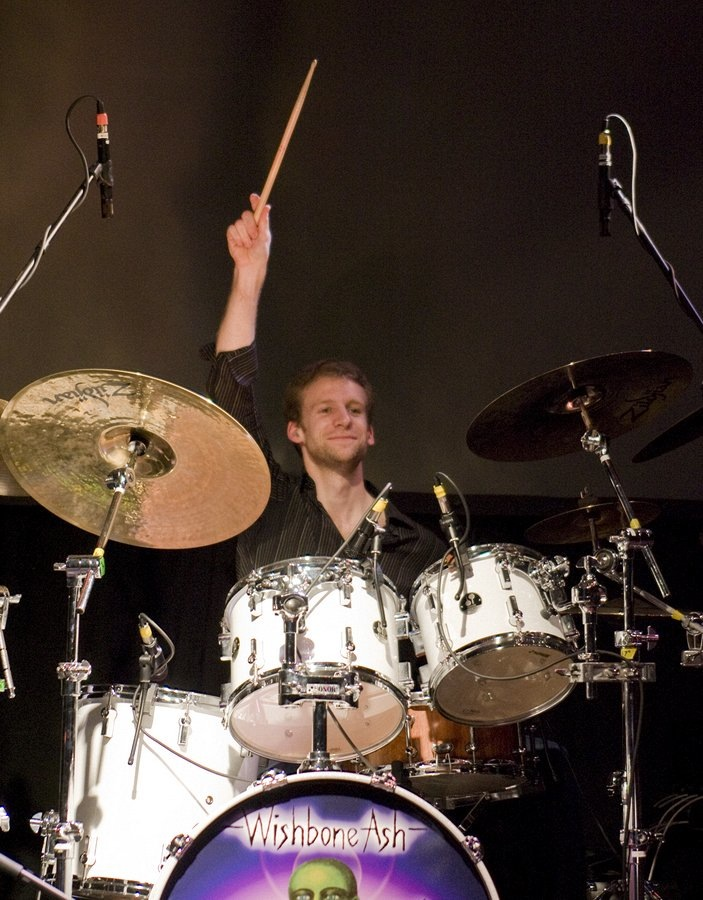
Joe Crabtree, BSc 2000
