= David Elbaz =

French astrophysicist

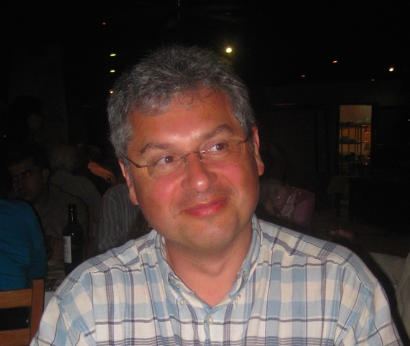
- Born: 18 March 1966 (age 60); Paris, France
- Citizenship: French
- Education: Joseph Fourier University
- Spouse: Pascale
- Children: Nathan, Gabriel
- Awards: Chrétien Award (2000); Prix Jaffé (2017); Member of Academia Europaea (2019)
- Scientific career
- Fields: Cosmology
- Workplaces: French Alternative Energies and Atomic Energy Commission
- Thesis: Origine du fer dans le milieu intra-amas et distribution du gaz X dans les amas de galaxies (1994)
- Doctoral advisor: James Lequeux, Monique Arnaud
- Website: http://david.elbaz3.free.fr/

David Elbaz (born March 18, 1966) is a French observational astrophysicist specializing in galaxy formation and evolution. He is a Research Director at the Commissariat à l'Énergie Atomique et aux Énergies Alternatives (CEA-Saclay), where he has worked as a researcher in the Astrophysics Division (AIM) since 1994. He led the Cosmology and Evolution of Galaxies laboratory for approximately a decade and has been the managing editor of the journal Astronomy & Astrophysics since 2018.

== Biography ==
Elbaz's grandparents moved to France from Morocco at the beginning of the 20th century. He was born and raised in the Paris area. He attended the École Nationale Supérieure de Physique (ENSPG) in Grenoble, where he obtained an engineering degree in 1990. He completed his PhD in Astrophysics in 1994 at the Université Joseph Fourier in Grenoble with a thesis entitled "Origine du fer dans le milieu intra-amas et distribution du gaz X dans les amas de galaxies". His supervisors were James Lequeux and Monique Arnaud. In 2005, he was awarded a habilitation from the Paris-Sud University.

Elbaz has supervised 14 postdoctoral researchers and 7 PhD students, two of whom received awards for their dissertations: H. Aussel (1999) and C. Schreiber (2015). He has been teaching the Galaxy Evolution course in the Masters program entitled Recherche Astronomie, Astrophysique et Ingénierie Spatiale de Paris since 2005.

== Research areas ==
Elbaz has made contributions in observational extragalactic astrophysics through space infrared and submillimeter observations. He has been recognized as an ISI Highly Cited researcher by Clarivate Analytics. In 2001, using new data from the Infrared Space Observatory, Elbaz and Ranga Chary produced a suite of galaxy spectral energy distribution templates. Along with the current knowledge of the galaxy redshift distribution, they were able to interpret the cosmic infrared background as being produced to at least 70% level from dust-enshrouded star formation in luminous infrared galaxies.

The advent of the Spitzer Space Telescope in 2003 enabled extremely deep observations in the mid-infrared field. Elbaz and his collaborators analyzed observations from the Great Observatories Origins Deep Survey and demonstrated that the star formation rate of individual galaxies increases due to environmental effects up to a critical galaxy density at redshift one, above which it decreases again, concluding that it suggests that galaxy evolution is not independent from structure formation at larger scales in the universe.

Five years later, using deep far infrared observations from the Herschel Space Observatory, Elbaz led a study, writing that galaxies across cosmic time form stars in two main modes: one placing them in the "main sequence", where their star formation rate correlates tightly with their stellar mass, and the other where the galaxies are more compact and form stars more efficiently departing from this correlation. Using observations from ALMA, his group also discovered a dominant population of optically invisible massive galaxies in the early universe.

== Awards ==
Elbaz has received several awards, including:

- Chrétien Award of the American Astronomical Society (2000)
- Prix Jaffé from the Foundation of the Institut de France (2017)
- Member of the Academia Europaea (2019)

== Administrative duties ==
Elbaz's duties in the astrophysics' community include:

- Managing Editor of Astronomy & Astrophysics, 2018–present
- Member of the ESA SPICA Science Team, 2018–2021
- Member of the Euclid France steering committee, 2013–present
- Member of the ESA Astronomy Working Group, 2015–2018
- President of the International Space Advisory Board for the SPICA satellite for JAXA, 2015–2016

== Public outreach ==
Elbaz has been interviewed on various topics of modern astrophysics by French media, including Le Monde, France Culture, and Sciences et Avenir. He has written scenarios and participated in shows that involve science and art that have been presented in various theaters in France, including:

- "La tête dans les étoiles" (with the neurobiologist Alain Destexhe and the magician Marc Feld)
- "Magicosmologie" (with Marc Feld)
- "Jonglerie Astrale" (with the juggler Vincent de Lavenère)

Elbaz has authored several science books:

- A la recherche de l'univers invisible: matière noire, énergie sombre, trous noirs, 2016, Odile Jacob; it received the "Prix Sciences et Philosophie" in 2017.
- Αναζητώντας το αόρατο σύμπαν: σκοτεινή ύλη, σκοτεινή ενέργεια, μαύρες τρύπες, 2021, Crete University Press.
- Le vase de Pépi, 2007, Odile Jacob.
- ...et Alice Tao se souvint du futur, 2010, Odile Jacob.
- La plus belle ruse de la lumière, 2021, Odile Jacob.
