= Prix Jaffé =

French mathematics award

The prix Jaffé is a prize of the Institut de France awarded by nomination of the French Academy of Sciences. The award is financially supported by the Jaffé foundation of the institute.

== Presentation ==
Founded in 1930, in the early years it awarding "a quadrennial prize to recognise research in pure or applied mathematics contributing to the progress and well-being of humanity". From 2001, two prizes of €7,750 are awarded each year, an amount which was later reduced to €6,850. It is awarded alternately to:

- a researcher for contributions pure or applied mechanics and computer science, as well as a researcher for pure or applied integrative biology work, for one year;
- a researcher for experiments in the field of sciences of the universe, as well as a researcher for experiments in cellular and molecular biology, for the other year.

== Winners ==
- 2021: Physicist Kamran Behnia (CNRS research director at the Sorbonne's Laboratory of Physics and Materials Study) for work on the Nernst and Seebeck coefficients, and microbiologist François-Loïc Cosset for work on biotherapies against chronic diseases.
- 2020: Chemist Rinaldo Poli and biologist Philippe Jay
- 2019: François Hild and Stéphane Roux, research directors at CNRS at LMT at École normale supérieure Paris-Saclay. They contributed in an essential way to the emergence of a French school of digital imagery (DIC) in solid mechanics.
- 2018: Sergio Ciliberto, CNRS exceptional class research director at the physics laboratory at École normale supérieure de Lyon for his work in non-linear and hydrodynamic physics
- 2017: David Elbaz, astrophysicist, Director of Research at the Commissariat à l'Énergie Atomique et aux Énergies Alternatives (CEA Saclay), where he heads the Cosmology and Evolution laboratory des Galaxies and Christiane Branlant.
- 2016: Grégory Miermont, professor of pure and applied mathematics at the École normale supérieure de Lyon, and Morgane Bomsel , director of research at the CNRS at the Cochin Institute, Paris Descartes University
- 2015: Luc Vervisch, professor at the National Institute of Applied Sciences in Rouen and Jean-Luc Imler
- 2014: Étienne Rolley, professor at Paris Diderot University, laboratory of statistical physics of the École normale supérieure de Paris. and Serge Palacin, director of research at the French Atomic Energy and Alternative Energy Commission, surface chemistry and interfaces group at Gif-sur-Yvette.
- 2013: Guy Perrier, honorary professor at the Joseph-Fourier University of Grenoble, and Frédéric Checler, research director at INSERM, CNRS Pharmacology Center in Sophia Antipolis.
- 2012: Jean-Pierre Labesse, professor emeritus at the University of Aix-Marseille II - Luminy Mathematics Institute in Marseille, and Monsef Benkirane, research director at CNRS at the Institute of Human Genetics at Molecular Virology Laboratory in Montpellier.
- 2011: Olivier Métais, director of the National School of Energy, Water and the Environment in Grenoble, and Elena Levashina, director of research at the CNRS at the Institut de Molecular biology of Plants in Strasbourg.
- 2010: Bernard Pannetier, research director at CNRS, Néel Institute in Grenoble, and Jean-Marie Beau, professor at Paris Sud 11 University, Institute of Chemistry of Natural Substances in Gif-sur-Yvette.
- 2009: Jean Virieux, university professor at the internal geophysics laboratory of the Joseph Fourier University in Grenoble, and Bruno Goud, research director at CNRS, head of the cell biology department at the Institut Curie in Paris.
- 2008: Frédéric Campana, professor at the University of Nancy I, and Sylvain Latour, director of research at the CNRS, at INSERM at the Necker-Sick Children Hospital in Paris.
- 2007: Pierre-Marie Lledo and Jan Traas
- 2006: Françoise Masnou-Seeuws
- 2005: François Schweisguth
- 2004: Michel Goossens and Colette Moeglin
- 2003: Hervé Vaucheret
- 2002: Yves Langlois
- 2001: Jean-Marc Barnola, Jérôme Chappellaz, Jean-Pierre Bachellerie
- 2000: Yves Frégnac
- 1998: Hélène Bouchiat
- 1997: Joël Janin
- 1996: Philippe Brûlet
- 1995: Jean-Michel Coron
- 1993: Julien Bok
- 1992: Jean Guern
- 1991: Jean-Christophe Yoccoz
- 1990: Margaret Buckingham
- 1987: Michaël Herman
- 1983-86:?
- 1982: Henri Jammet and Jean Montreuil
- 1980: Claude Martin
- 1978: Michael Michelson
- 1976: Jean-François Bach
- 1975: Paul Queney
- 1974: Yves Coppens
- 1972: Pierre Desnuelle
- 1970: Georges Morel
- 1969: Pierre Connes
- 1968: Pierre Grabar
- 1966: Paul Giroud
- 1964: Alfred Jost
- 1962: René Hazard and Pierre Jacquinot
- 1961: Émile Terroine
