= Brian Tanner =

Brian Tanner may refer to:

- Brian Tanner, a character in the TV series ALF
- Brian Keith Tanner (born 1947), British physicist
