= SAFARI imaging spectrometer =

Instrument intended for the SPICA mission

The SAFARI imaging spectrometer was the European image sensor of Japanese infrared telescope SPICA (Space Infra-Red Telescope for Cosmology and Astrophysics telescope) and is being developed under the leadership of SRON Netherlands Institute for Space Research. SAFARI is an infrared camera with about 6,000 pixels that can make real ‘photos’ of the sky in three adjacent wavelength areas. Fourier transform spectroscopy (FTS) obtains detailed spectral information, allowing astronomers to determine the chemical composition of the observed celestial sources. The Netherlands Organisation for Applied Scientific Research (TNO) is developing the mechanism of this FTS.

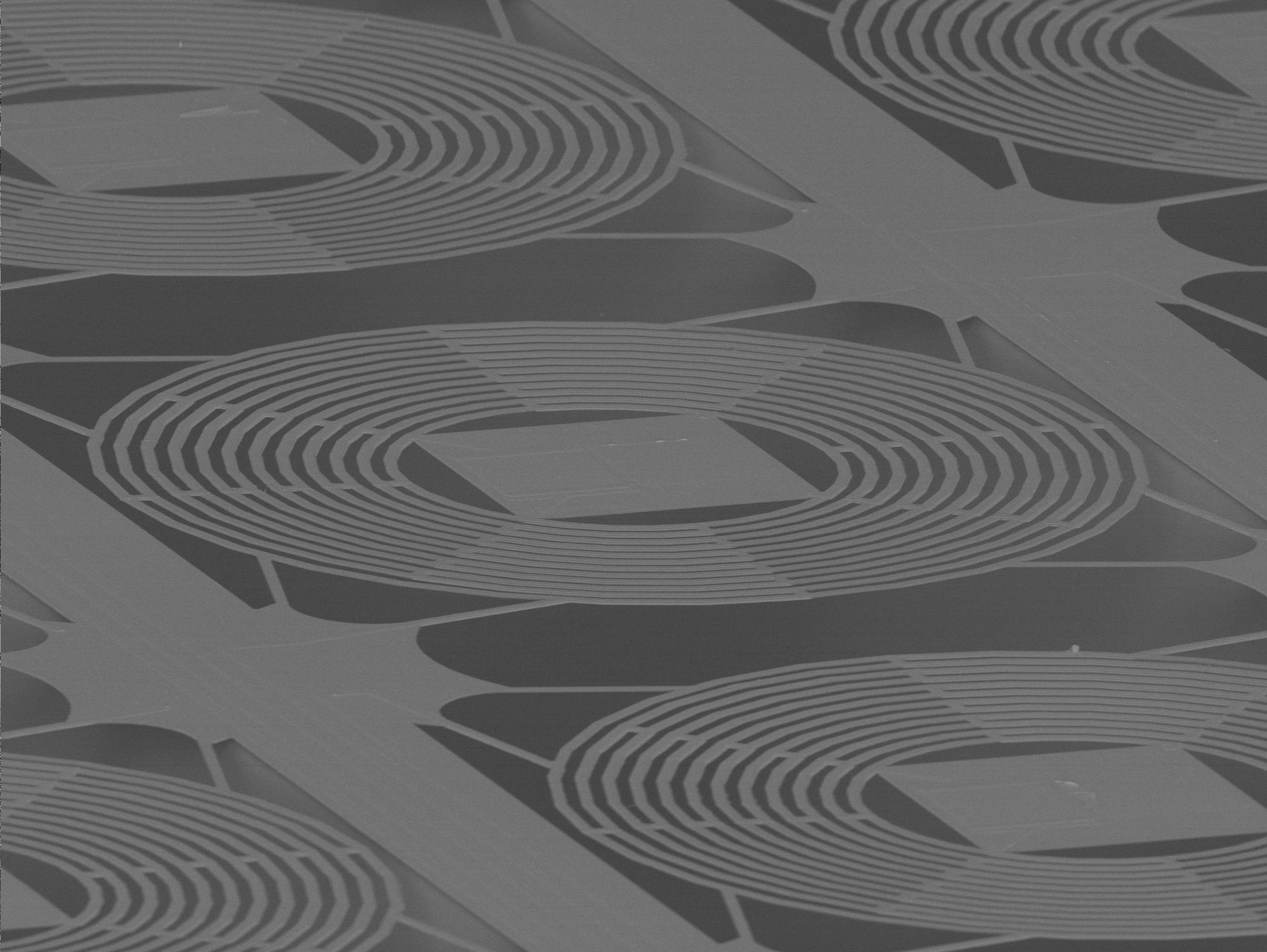
Transition Edge Sensors (TES) detectors are extremely sensitive infrared detectors

SRON's leading role in the development of SAFARI is mainly due to the infrared detectors developed by SRON scientists. Extremely sensitive detectors must be used in SAFARI to gain maximum benefit from the low infrared emissions of SPICA's cooled mirror. In June 2010, an international evaluation committee selected, out of four different technologies, the transition-edge sensor (TES) detectors from SRON together with the associated readout electronics.

== No longer blinded by the mirror ==
The 3.2 meter diameter mirror of SPICA would be cooled to almost absolute zero (-273 °C). Consequently, the detectors would not be ‘blinded’ by the heat radiation emitted by the mirror itself and the instruments could detect even weaker infrared sources than the most sensitive instruments on board ESA's infrared Herschel Space Observatory can. The telescope would see sources at the level of the cosmic background radiation in the wavelength range between 30 and 210 μm. Launch was originally planned in 2018.

== Successor to HIFI instrument ==
SAFARI is the immediate successor to SRON's molecule hunter HIFI on board the infrared telescope Herschel. This new infrared imaging spectrometer can fully utilize the ultra-sensitive TES detectors in combination with SPICA's extremely cold mirror to look even deeper into the far-infrared universe than HIFI. SAFARI will search for the first galaxies to determine how they were formed and how they evolve. Nearer by the instrument will be used to study the ice and water vapor in protoplanetary discs – the physical and chemical conditions in these protoplanetary discs ultimately determine the formation of planets.

== Leading role of SRON ==
The SAFARI project is complex from both a technological and organizational viewpoint. As Principal Investigator, SRON coordinates the collaboration between the large number of international partners (including JAXA and European Space Agency ESA). In addition to this, SRON is responsible for the further development and testing of the detectors for SAFARI (an SRON/UK joint venture), the optomechanics, the quality control, the construction and the system testing for the entire instrument. TNO is one of the partners in the project.
