= Françoise Masnou-Seeuws =

French physicist

Academic background
- Education: Paris Diderot University

Academic work
- Discipline: physics
- Institutions: French National Centre for Scientific Research
- Main interests: ultracold molecules; photoassociation

Françoise Masnou-Seeuws is a French physicist, specializing in ultracold molecules. Masnou-Seeuws earned a doctorate in physics through Paris Diderot University in 1973. Subsequently, she became a director of research for the French National Centre for Scientific Research, posted to the Laboratoire Aimé Cotton in Orsay.

In 2006, she received the Prix Jaffé of the Institut de France and French Academy of Sciences for her research on photoassociation, a process of laser-intermediated bonding of ultracold atoms into molecules. In the same year, she was named a Fellow of the American Physical Society (APS), after a nomination from the APS Division of Atomic, Molecular and Optical Physics, "for the development and application of original procedures for high precision calculations of the properties of diatomic molecules and the creation of ultracold molecules by photoassociation of ultracold atoms".
