= Stéphane Roux =

Stéphane Roux may refer to:

- Stéphane Roux (actor)
- Stéphane Roux (comics)
- Stéphane Roux (physicist)
