= Shuster + Moseley =

British artist duo working with light

- Education: Goldsmiths College, University of Kent, University of Exeter, European Graduate School
- Years active: 2014–present
- Known for: Light art, Suspended sculpture, Site-specific art
- Website: www.shustermoseley.com

Shuster + Moseley are a British artist duo, Claudia Moseley (born 1984) and Edward Shuster (born 1986). Based in London, they create installations and sculptural works in light and glass, which have been described as drawing on philosophical ideas about light. They began collaborating in 2007 after meeting on a tree-dwelling protest site in the Brecon Beacons, and formally established their practice as Shuster + Moseley in 2014. Building on the traditions of Light and Space, light art, and installation art, they explore phenomenological, spatial, and metaphysical dimensions of light through suspended sculpture and site-specific art. Their work has been exhibited at sites including the Giza Plateau and AlUla, both UNESCO World Heritage sites.

== Artistic Practice and Career ==
=== Practice ===
The artists' optical glass sculptures and installations of suspended hand-blown lenses that manipulate light through refraction and reflection have been integrated into architectural and outdoor sites. Critics have described their work as focusing on light as both medium and subject, examining its relationship to consciousness and technology. Writers have also described their work as referencing contemplative traditions, creating meditative environments that explore the dynamics of attention within technologically mediated perception.

The artists have collaborated with scientists and engineers in fields including spectroscopy, cosmology and neuroscience, such as the Institute for Computational Cosmology.

=== Early Influences and Education ===
Their early work was inspired by Shuster’s background in philosophy and Moseley’s early art practice at Goldsmiths College, which reflected on her family heritage in the British film industry. Early coverage of the duo highlighted their cosmological approach to light-based installations. Moseley studied Fine art and Textiles at Goldsmiths College and holds an MA in Environmental Anthropology from the University of Kent, while Shuster holds an MA in Western Esotericism from the University of Exeter and a PhD in philosophy titled The Pharmakology of Light-Time from the European Graduate School (2017).

=== Selected Works ===
In 2023, the artists appeared in British Vogue Forces for Change film series, featuring a short film of their studio practice and the making of their ‘Light-Mobiles’. Light-Mobiles (2015–ongoing) are a series of suspended glass sculptures exploring the interaction of light and space.

Their large-scale site-specific works include What Matters (The Scattering) (2017), commissioned for Lumiere Durham. The work was described by the festival as mapping the cosmic microwave background radiation in St Oswald's Church, Durham. Horizon of Day and Night (2020) comprised nine prismatic glass monoliths installed in the UNESCO World Heritage site of Mada’in Salih, AlUla, Saudi Arabia, drawing on megalithic stone circle surveying and computational modelling.

Plan of the Path of Light (In the House of the Hidden Places) (2021) was an installation of four large geometric glass sculptures presented as part of Forever Is Now, a contemporary art exhibition on the Giza Plateau, organised under the patronage of UNESCO. The work incorporated geometrical ratios derived from studies of the Great Pyramid of Giza. The installation was reported in outlets including ELLE Decor Italia, The Telegraph Luxury, and Artnet News. Shuster + Moseley were among the ten artists selected for the inaugural exhibition.

Their early collaborations included a series of biophilic pavilions and experimental public-space installations in London parks, such as The TreeHouse Gallery in Regent’s Park (2009), The Invisible City project (2012), and TREExOFFICE (2015).

Other works include Epiphany at a Distance (2018), a site-specific installation for the Light Art Biennale at the Palazzo Ducale in Italy, Progress (2018), selected for the XX Cerveira International Art Biennial in Portugal and now part of the biennial’s collection, and Gossamer (Empty Mirror of the Sky) (2024), commissioned for Noor Riyadh, Saudi Arabia.

The artists are members of the Royal Society of Sculptors. In 2019, Moseley was featured in Bucherer’s global Blue campaign. and the duo were profiled in Vogue Italia in 2025.
