= Gordon Love =

Gordon Love may refer to:

- Gordon Love (rower), French rower
- Gordon D. Love, British physicist
