= Aharonyan =

Aharonyan (Armenian: Ահարոնյան), also transliterated as Aharonian, is an Armenian surname. Notable people with the surname include:

- Avetis Aharonyan (1866–1948), Armenian politician and writer
- Ruben Aharonyan (born 1947), Armenian classical violinist

Aharonian

- Coriún Aharonián (1940–2017), Uruguayan composer and musicologist
- Felix A. Aharonian (born 1952), astrophysicist
