= Elspeth Garman =

Professor of Molecular Biophysics

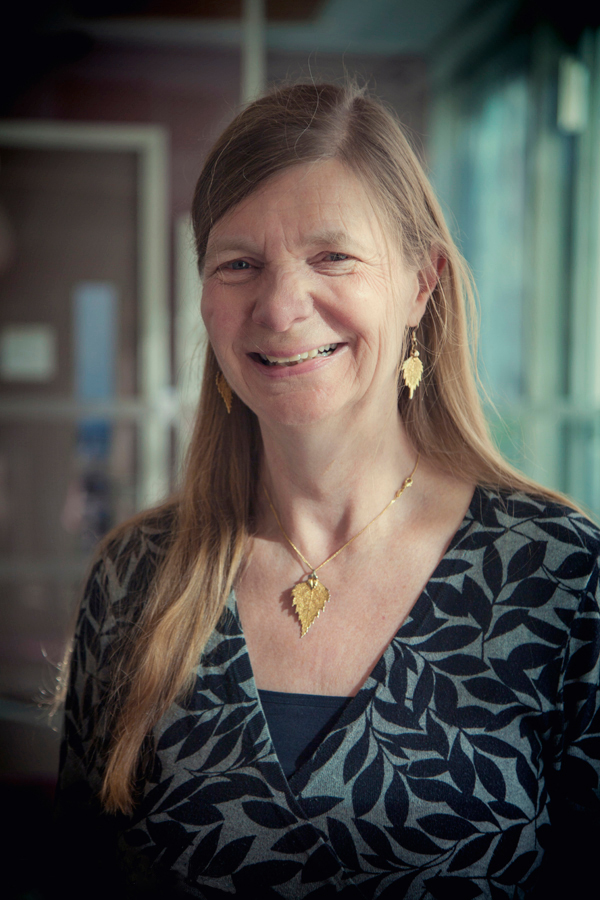
- Born: Rothbury
- Education: Durham University, University of Oxford
- Occupations: Physicist; university teacher; scientist
- Employer: University of Oxford
- Spouse: John James Barnett
- Awards: Suffrage Science award (2020)
- Scientific career
- Fields: Structural biology, crystallography, physics, nuclear physics, X-ray crystallography
- Workplaces: University of Oxford
- Thesis: Inelastic alpha particle scattering from ¹⁶O and medium mass nuclei in the incident energy range 7-18 MeV
- Doctoral advisor: Kenneth Allen
- Website: www.bioch.ox.ac.uk/garmangroup

Elspeth Frances Garman is a retired professor of molecular biophysics at the University of Oxford and a former President of the British Crystallographic Association. Until 2021 she was also Senior Kurti Research Fellow at Brasenose College, Oxford, where she is now an emeritus fellow. The "Garman limit", which is the radiation dose limit of a cryocooled protein crystal, is named after her.

== Education and career ==
Garman studied physics at Durham University and then moved to Linacre College, Oxford, for a doctorate in nuclear physics supervised by Kenneth Allen which she completed in 1980. She taught at Lincoln College, St Hilda's College, St Anne's College, Somerville College, and Worcester College, and switched to biophysics in 1987. Since then, she has co-authored more than 150 Protein Data Bank entries and contributed to techniques for macromolecular structure determination. In particular, Garman has been amongst the pioneers of cryoprotection of macromolecular crystals and has made major contributions to the study of the damage that X-rays induce in macromolecular crystals. In a seminal paper in 2006, Garman and collaborators established the radiation dose limit for cryocooled protein crystals, which was named the "Garman limit" after her. In 2025, Garman and Nicola Laurieri published Mathematics for Biosciences: From Theory to Worked Examples and Applications, an undergraduate textbook covering mathematical methods and applications in the biosciences.

== Awards ==
In 2014, she was awarded the Rose Lecture and Medal at Kingston University and the Humanitarian Award of the Women's International Film and Television Showcase. In 2015 she received the Mildred Dresselhaus Senior Award and guest professorship at the Hamburg Centre for Ultrafast Imaging. In 2016 she received the I. Fankuchen Award of the American Crystallographic Association. In 2008 she was awarded Major Educator by the University of Oxford. In 2014 she was awarded Most Acclaimed Lecturer Award by OUSU as well as an 'Individual Teaching Award' from Mathematical, Physical and Life Sciences (MPLS) Division. Garman is the first recipient of the Sosei Heptares Prize, awarded in July 2018. She received an honorary doctorate from Durham University in July 2019. In August 2019, the European Crystallographic Association awarded her the 11th Max Perutz Prize. She was elected Fellow of the American Crystallographic Association in 2019. In 2020 she was awarded the Suffrage Science Life Sciences Award. In 2021 she was awarded a Lifetime Achievement Teaching Award from the Medical Sciences Division of the University of Oxford.

== Public engagement ==
Garman has been involved in over 40 TV and radio programmes. In December 2017, she gave a talk as part of the Illuminating Atoms exhibition at the Royal Albert Hall. In 2014 she was interviewed for BBC Radio 4's programme The Life Scientific. Garman also helped produce a video with the Royal Institution about "Understanding Crystallography". In 2014 she helped to create an animated video with Oxford Sparks on crystallography. In 2010 she gave the Dorothy Hodgkin Memorial Lecture "Crystallography One Century AD (after Dorothy)". In 2016 she gave the inaugural Rosalind Franklin memorial lecture as well as the inaugural Lawrence Bragg memorial lecture.

== Personal life ==
Garman married John James Barnett (1947–2010), an atmospheric physicist, in January 1979. There are three daughters. Garman is a keen rower, and obtained a rowing half-blue in 1978.
