= Shaun Cole =

British cosmologist and academic

- Born: Chipping, Lancashire, England
- Education: Jesus College, Oxford; Clare College, Cambridge
- Known for: Discovery of Baryon Acoustic Oscillations, Semi-analytical Models in Galaxy Formation
- Awards: Shaw Prize (2014)
- Scientific career
- Fields: Cosmology, Galaxy formation, Galactic Astronomy
- Workplaces: University of California Berkeley; Durham University
- Doctoral advisor: George Efstathiou and Nick Kaiser
- Website: star-www.dur.ac.uk/~cole

Shaun Malcolm Cole (born 19 November 1963) is a British cosmologist.

Cole grew up in Chipping, Lancashire. He graduated from Jesus College, Oxford with a first-class degree in Physics in 1985, and subsequently completed Part III of the Mathematical Tripos at the University of Cambridge. His performance in Part III was strong enough to earn a studentship for a PhD at the Cambridge Institute of Astronomy.

Cole has been Professor of Physics at Durham University since 2005 and was the director of the Institute for Computational Cosmology (2020-2025). He was joint-winner of the 2014 Shaw Prize with Daniel Eisenstein and John A. Peacock.
