= Paula Chadwick =

British physicist and academic

Paula Chadwick FRAS FInstP
- Born: Mary Paula Chadwick
- Education: Queen Mary University of London; Durham University
- Scientific career
- Workplaces: Durham University
- Thesis: Very high energy cosmic gamma rays from radio and x-ray pulsars (1987)
- Website: www.durham.ac.uk/staff/p-m-chadwick/

Mary Paula Chadwick FRAS FInstP is a British physicist who is professor and head of the Department of Physics at Durham University. Her research investigates gamma-ray astronomy and astroparticle physics. She is involved with the Cherenkov Telescope Array.

== Early life and education ==
Chadwick became interested in astronomy as a child. She believes the Apollo 11 moon landing may have triggered her passion. Chadwick was an undergraduate student at Queen Mary University of London. She moved to Durham University for her doctoral research, where she studied high energy cosmic gamma rays from pulsars.

== Research and career ==
Chadwick leads gamma-ray astronomy at Durham University. She is particularly interested in supernova explosions and black holes which produce high-speed jets. When gamma rays (the most energetic form of electromagnetic radiation) hit the atmosphere, they produce a cascade of high energy matter that travels faster than the speed of light in air. This produces a brief flash of high energy light (Cherenkov radiation), which Chadwick tries to detect with large telescopes.

In 2015, Chadwick was awarded the Lawrence Bragg Medal and Prize for her efforts to engage undergraduates with industry.

=== Selected publications ===
- A Abramowski; F Acero; F Aharonian; et al. (22 January 2013). "Search for photon-linelike signatures from dark matter annihilations with H.E.S.S.". Physical Review Letters. 110 (4) 041301. arXiv:1301.1173. doi:10.1103/physrevlett.110.041301. ISSN 0031-9007. PMID 25166149. Wikidata Q51274745.
- F. Aharonian; A. G. Akhperjanian; A. R. Bazer-Bachi; et al. (12 September 2006). "Observations of the Crab nebula with HESS". Astronomy & Astrophysics. 457 (3): 899–915. arXiv:astro-ph/0607333. Bibcode:2006A&A...457..899A. doi:10.1051/0004-6361:20065351. ISSN 0004-6361. Wikidata Q53161742.
- M. Actis; G. Agnetta; F. Aharonian; et al. (23 November 2011). "Design concepts for the Cherenkov Telescope Array CTA: an advanced facility for ground-based high-energy gamma-ray astronomy". Experimental Astronomy. 32 (3): 193–316. arXiv:1008.3703. Bibcode:2011ExA....32..193A. doi:10.1007/s10686-011-9247-0. ISSN 0922-6435. Wikidata Q56933794.
