= DiRAC =

UK supercomputing research facilities

Distributed Research using Advanced Computing (DiRAC)
- Named after: Paul Dirac
- Established: 2009
- Locations: Cambridge; Durham; Edinburgh; Leicester
- Services: Supercomputing
- Director: Mark Wilkinson
- Parent organization: Science and Technology Facilities Council
- Website: dirac.ac.uk

Distributed Research using Advanced Computing (DiRAC) is an integrated supercomputing facility used for research in particle physics, astronomy and cosmology in the United Kingdom. DiRAC makes use of multi-core processors and provides a variety of computer architectures for use by the research community.

== Development ==
- DiRAC: DiRAC was initially funded in 2009 with an investment of £12 million from the Government of the United Kingdom's Large Facilities Capital Fund combined with funds from the Science and Technology Facilities Council (STFC) and a consortium of universities in the UK.
- DiRAC II: In 2012, the DiRAC facility was upgraded with a further £15 million of UK government capital to create DiRAC II which had five installations.
- DiRAC-3: was launched in 2021, with three services offered at four sites:
  - Data intensive service, jointly hosted by the universities of Cambridge (part share in the "Cumulus" HPC platform) and Leicester (Data Intensive 3 and Data Intensive 2.5x supercomputers)
  - Memory intensive service, hosted by Durham University at the Institute for Computational Cosmology (Memory Intensive 3 "COSMA8" and Memory Intensive 2.5 "COSMA7" supercomputers)
  - Extreme scaling service, hosted by the University of Edinburgh (Extreme Scaling "Tursa" supercomputer)

== Paul Dirac ==
"DiRAC" is a backronym which honours the theoretical physicist and Nobel laureate Paul Dirac.
