= Gordon D. Love =

British physicist

Gordon Love
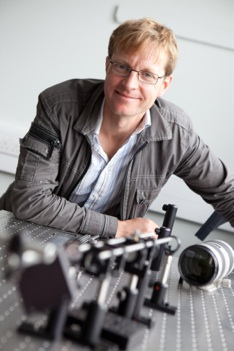
- Born: 1967 (age 58–59); Leeds, UK
- Education: Durham University (BSc, PhD)
- Scientific career
- Fields: Optics
- Workplaces: Durham University; University of Leeds

Gordon D Love (born 1967) is a British physicist. Love is a professor of computer science and physics at the University of Leeds and is the head of the University of Leeds' School of Computer Science. Love is a former professor at the Durham University Department of Physics and a specialist in optics research. He is noted in particular for his work in adaptive optics.

He is a council member of the Institute of Physics and past board member of the European Optical Society.

== Education ==
Love earned both his Bachelor of Science and doctorate from Durham University. He was an undergraduate at Van Mildert College. He attended Ralph Thoresby High School in Leeds.
