= Institute for Computational Cosmology =

Research institute at Durham University

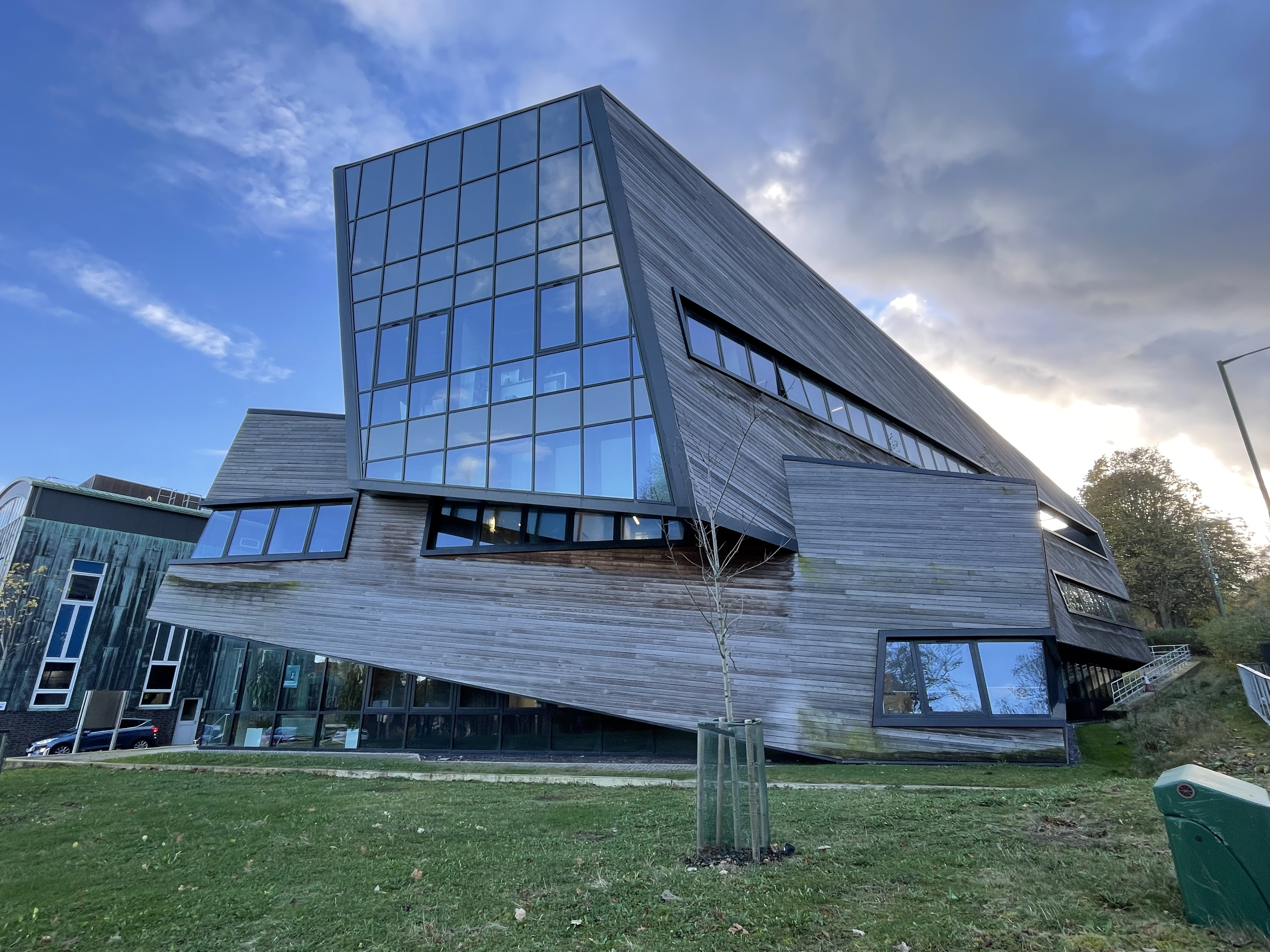
- Established: November 2002
- Purpose: Cosmology
- Coordinates: 54°46′01″N 1°34′30″W
- Director: Shaun Cole
- Parent organization: Durham University
- Website: icc.dur.ac.uk

The Institute for Computational Cosmology (ICC) is a research institute at Durham University in England. It was founded in November 2002 as part of the Ogden Centre for Fundamental Physics. The ICC's primary mission is to advance fundamental knowledge in cosmology, and its topics of active research include the nature of dark matter and dark energy, the evolution of cosmic structure, the formation of galaxies, and the determination of fundamental parameters.

The current director of the ICC is Shaun Cole. ICC researchers have played a central role in the development of the standard model of cosmology, the Lambda-CDM model (ΛCDM), and the ICC has one of the most powerful supercomputers for academic research in the world, the Cosmology Machine (COSMA).

== History ==
Durham University's extragalactic astronomy group was founded in the late 1970s, and secured in 1984–5. A group researching theoretical cosmology grew steadily during the 1980s and 1990s, mainly funded by the UK Particle Physics and Astronomy Research Council (PPARC). A dedicated building for theoretical cosmology was then funded through private donations, principally from alumnus Peter Ogden, and was opened in 2002 by Prime Minister Tony Blair. The ICC now hosts more than 60 researchers, including theoretical and observational cosmologists, as well as astroparticle physicists. Uniquely amongst Durham University's Research Institutes, the ICC and Institute for Particle Physics Phenomenology (IPPP) are structurally integrated within an academic and teaching department, Physics. The physics department as a whole was awarded grade 5A in the 2001 Research Assessment Exercise by the UK government, with the international excellence of research in Astronomy and Particle Physics specifically highlighted. The department's research in Space Science and Astrophysics was rated as number one in Europe and fourth in the world by Thomson Reuters from its Essential Science Indicators (1998–2008).

In November 2016, the ICC moved into the brand new Ogden Centre for Fundamental Physics building, designed by Studio Daniel Libeskind. The new building now houses all three astronomy groups in the Department of Physics, including the Centre for Advanced Instrumentation, Centre for Extragalactic Astronomy, and the Institute for Computational Cosmology.

== Supercomputer ==
The complex nature of questions in cosmology often means that advances require supercomputer simulations in which a virtual Universe is allowed to evolve for 13.8 billion years from the Big Bang to the present day. The ICC's highest resolution simulations of the evolution of the Universe are performed on the Cosmology Machine (COSMA). COSMA-5 was installed in October 2012 as a hub of the UK national Distributed Research utilitising Advanced Computing (DiRAC) consortium. It includes 6720 2.6 GHz Intel Sandy Bridge Central processing unit (CPU) cores, 53,760 GB of RAM, and 2.4 PB of data storage, and is considered one of the most powerful supercomputers in the world. The ICC acts as one of the two main nodes of the international Virgo Consortium for cosmological supercomputer simulations.

== Outreach ==
A founding goal of the ICC is to "stimulate young people to aspire to be the scientists of tomorrow". A full-time outreach officer is employed to develop teaching materials that draw upon current research and coordinate a programme of activities in schools across the North East of England.

The ICC's 3D short movie "Cosmic Origins", which combines sequences of real astronomical data and supercomputer simulations, won first prize for best stereoscopic movie at Stereoscopic Displays and Applications XXI. The movie, and its sequel "Cosmic Origins 2" provided the core entertainment of a touring public exhibition that visited the Royal Society's Summer Science Exhibitions 2009, 2010 and 2013; See Further 2010; the British Science Festival 2013; and Thailand's National Science and Technology Fair 2013.

In 2015, the ICC collaborated on The World Machine project, the centrepiece of the 2015 Durham Lumiere light festival. The project was a celebration of cosmology, projected onto the facade of Durham Cathedral. In July 2016, the ICC hosted an exhibition titled Galaxy Makers: How to make a galaxy at the Royal Society 2016 Summer Exhibition.
