= Télécom Physique Strasbourg =

Engineering college in Strasbourg, France

Coordinates: 48°31′33″N 7°44′16″E

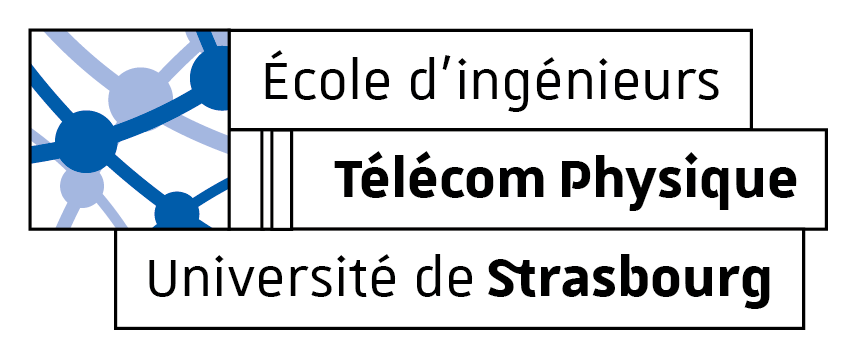
- Type: Public
- Established: 1970
- Affiliations: Conférence des Grandes écoles University of Strasbourg; Institut Mines-Télécom; Commission des titres d’ingénieur Carnot M.I.N.E.S; Conference of Deans of French Schools of Engineering (CDEFI); AlsaceTech
- Location: Illkirch-Graffenstaden, France
- Website: www.telecom-physique.fr

The Télécom Physique Strasbourg (TPS), former École Nationale Supérieure de Physique de Strasbourg (ENSPS), is a French grande école and engineering school in Strasbourg, France. Télécom Physique belongs to the University of Strasbourg.

== Training ==
As most schools of engineering in France, Télécom Physique recruits its students after two years of post-bac intensive studies. The education at the school lasts for three years, and includes theoretical and practical education, training in companies and laboratories. The school offers different areas of expertise:

1. Image Processing and Computer Vision
2. Software and network engineering
3. Automation and Robotics
4. Biophysics
5. Electronics
6. Photonics
7. Physics and modeling

Each of these options can be obtained with a master's degree from the university along with the master of engineering degree.

== History ==
Opened in 1970, the ENSP was a school dedicated to the education of engineers in different trainings related to physics, located on the Esplanade campus of Strasbourg. Classes of about 15 students achieved the school at its beginning. In 1994, the school moved to the Pôle API, in Illkirch-Graffenstaden, to be closer to laboratories and specialized companies.

In 2012, the institute changes its name to Télécom Physique Strasbourg. Nowadays, almost 100 students graduate every year.
