= SPICA (spacecraft) =

Proposed far-infrared space observatory

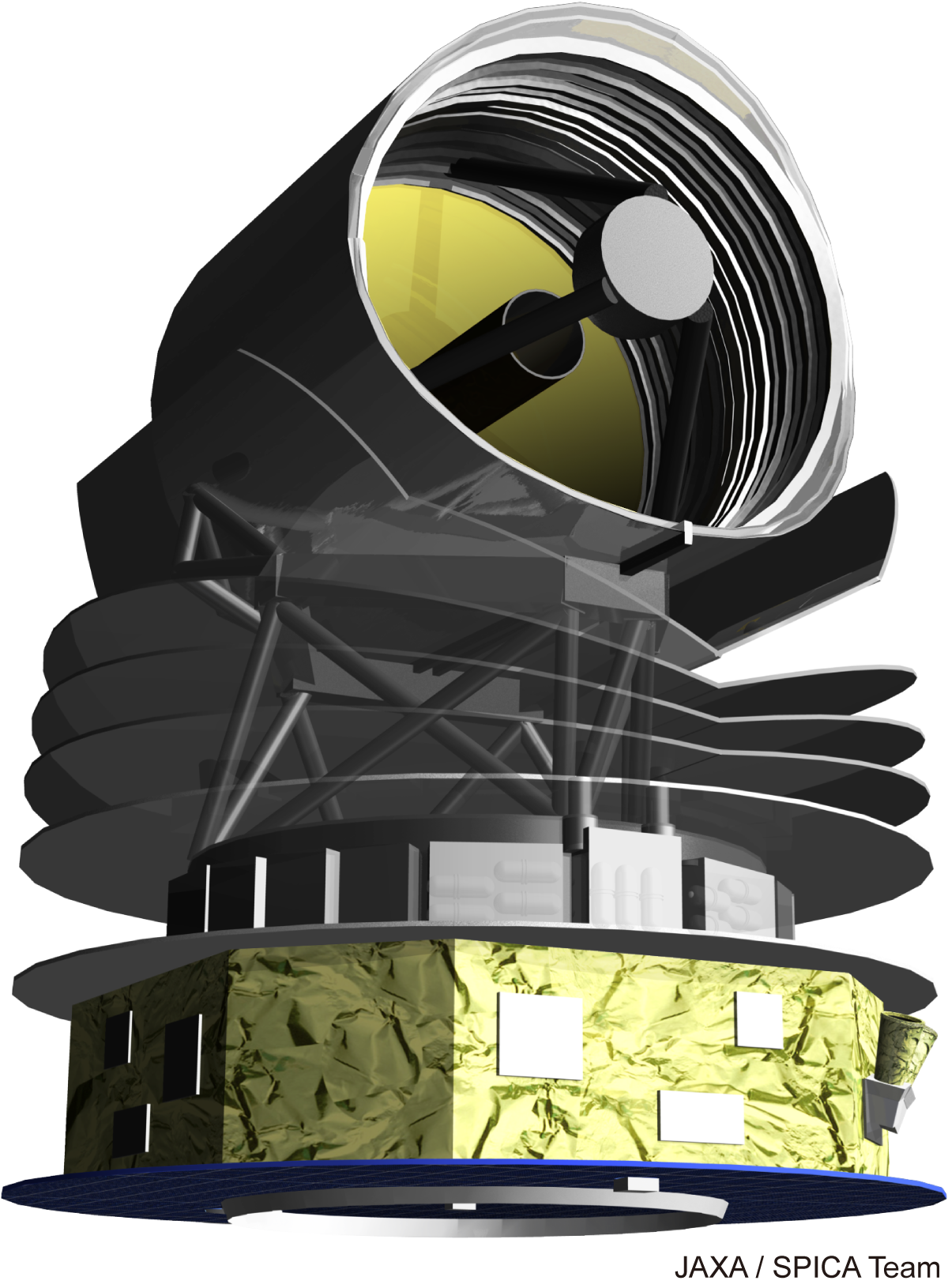
- Mission type: Infrared astronomy
- Operator: ESA / JAXA
- Website: jaxa.jp/SPICA
- Mission duration: 3 years (science mission); 5 years (design goal)

Spacecraft properties
- Launch mass: 3650 kg
- Payload mass: 600 kg
- Dimensions: 5.9 x 4.5 m
- Power: 3 kW from a 14 m^{2} solar array

Start of mission
- Launch date: 2032
- Rocket: H3
- Launch site: Tanegashima, LA-Y
- Contractor: Mitsubishi Heavy Industries

Orbital parameters
- Reference system: Sun–Earth L_{2}
- Regime: Halo orbit
- Epoch: Planned

Main telescope
- Type: Ritchey-Chrétien
- Diameter: 2.5 m
- Collecting area: 4.6 m^{2}
- Wavelengths: From 12 μm (mid-infrared) to 230 μm (far-infrared)

Instruments
SAFARI	SpicA FAR-infrared Instrument
SMI	SPICA Mid-Infrared Instrument
B-BOP	Magnetic field explorer with BOlometers and Polarizers

The Space Infrared Telescope for Cosmology and Astrophysics (SPICA) was a proposed infrared space telescope, follow-on to the successful Akari space observatory. It was a collaboration between European and Japanese scientists, which was selected in May 2018 by the European Space Agency (ESA) as a finalist for the next Medium class Mission 5 (M5) of the Cosmic Vision programme, to launch in 2032. At the time the other two finalists were THESEUS and EnVision, with the latter that was eventually selected for further development. SPICA would have improved on the spectral line sensitivity of previous missions, the Spitzer and Herschel space telescopes, between 30 and 230 μm by a factor of 50—100.

A final decision was expected in 2021, but in October 2020, it was announced that SPICA was no longer being considered as a candidate for the M5 mission.

== History ==
In Japan, SPICA was first proposed in 2007, initially called HII-L2 after the launch vehicle and orbit, as a large Strategic L-class mission, and in Europe it was proposed to ESA's Cosmic Vision programme (M1 and M2), but an internal review at ESA at the end of 2009 suggested that the technology readiness for the mission was not adequate.

In May 2018, it was selected as one of three finalists for the Cosmic Vision Medium Class Mission 5 (M5) for a proposed launch date of 2032. Within ESA, SPICA was part of the Medium Class-5 (M5) mission competition, with a cost cap of 550M Euros.

It stopped being a candidate for M5 in October 2020 due to financial constraints.

== Overview ==
The concept was a collaboration between the European Space Agency (ESA) and the Japan Aerospace Exploration Agency (JAXA). If funded, the telescope would have been launched on JAXA's H3 launch vehicle.

The Ritchey–Chrétien telescope's 2.5-metre mirror (smaller in size to the mirror of the Herschel Space Observatory) would have been made of silicon carbide, possibly by ESA given their experience with the Herschel telescope. The main mission of the spacecraft would have been the study of star and planetary formation. It would have been able to detect stellar nurseries in galaxies, protoplanetary discs around young stars, and exoplanets, helped by its own coronograph for the latter two types of objects.

== Description ==
The observatory would have featured a far-infrared spectrometer and was proposed to be deployed in a halo orbit around the L2 point. The design featured V-groove radiators and mechanical cryocoolers rather than liquid helium to cool the mirror to below 8 K (−265.15 °C) (versus the 80 K or so of a mirror cooled only by radiation like Herschel's) which provides substantially greater sensitivity in the 10–100 μm infrared band (IR band); the telescope was intended to observe infrared light at longer wavelengths than the James Webb Space Telescope. Its sensitivity would have been more than two orders of magnitude over both the Spitzer and Herschel space telescopes.

Large-aperture Cryogenic Telescope

SPICA would have employed a 2.5 m diameter Ritchey–Chrétien telescope with a field of view of 30 arc minutes.

Focal-Plane Instruments

- SMI (SPICA Mid-infrared Instrument): 12–36 μm
  - SMI-LRS (Low-Resolution Spectroscopy): 17–36 μm. Its aim would have been the detection of PAH dust emission as a clue of distant galaxies and emission of minerals from planet formation regions around stars
  - SMI-MRS (Mid-Resolution Spectroscopy): 18–36 μm. Its high sensitivity for line emission with a relatively high wavelength resolution (R=2000) would have enabled the characterization of distant galaxies and planet formation regions detected by SMI-LRS
  - SMI-HRS (High-Resolution Spectroscopy): 12–18 μm. With its extremely high wavelength resolution (R=28000), SMI-HRS could study the dynamics of molecular gas in planet formation regions around stars
- SAFARI (SPICA Far-infrared Instrument): 35–230 μm
- B-BOP (B-BOP stands for "B-fields with BOlometers and Polarizers"): Imaging polarimeter operating in three bands, 100 μm, 200 μm and 350 μm. B-Bop would have enabled the polarimetric mapping of Galactic filamentary structures to study the role of magnetic fields in filaments and star formation.

== Objectives ==
As in the name, the main objective was to make advancement in the research of cosmology and astrophysics. Specific research fields include:

- The birth and evolution of galaxies
- The birth and evolution of stars and planetary systems
- The evolution of matter

=== Discovery science ===
- Setting constraints on the emission of ground state Н_{2} emission from the first (population III) generation of stars
- The detection of biomarkers in the mid-infrared spectra of exo-planets and/or the primordial material in protoplanetary disks
- The detection of Н_{2} haloes around galaxies in the local Universe
- With sufficient technical development of coronagraphic techniques: the imaging of any planets in the habitable zone in the nearest few stars
- The detection of the far infrared transitions of polycyclic aromatic hydrocarbons (PAHs) in the interstellar medium. The very large molecules thought to comprise the PAHs, and which give rise to the characteristic features in the near-infrared, have vibrational transitions in the far-infrared which are widespread and extremely weak
- The direct detection of dust formation in super novae in external galaxies and the determination of the origin of the large amounts of dust in high redshift galaxies

== See also ==
- Akari
- ALMA
- Herschel Space Observatory
- James Webb Space Telescope
- Origins Space Telescope
