= Elizabeth J. Tasker =

British astrophysicist

Elizabeth Tasker
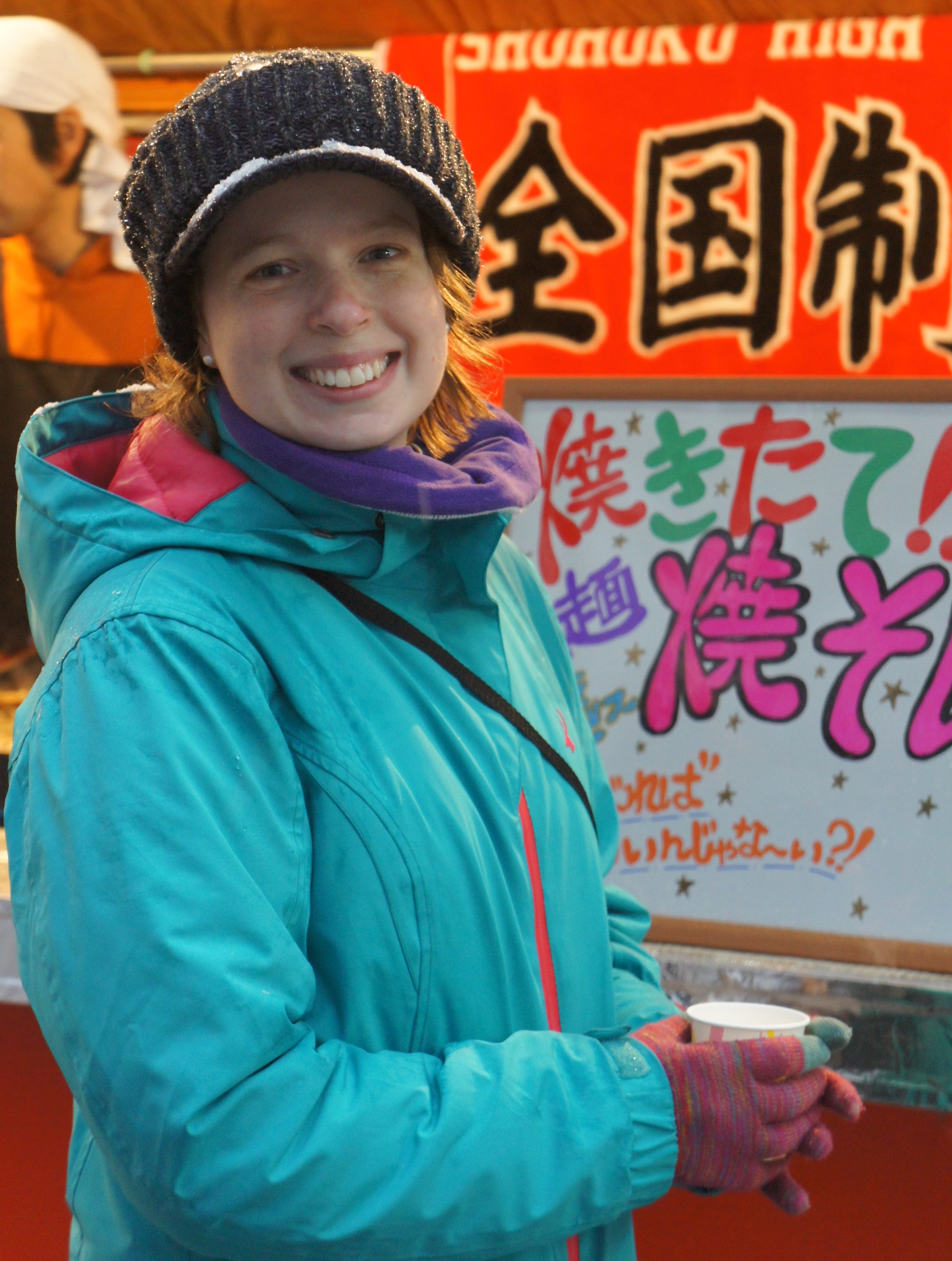
- Tasker in 2014
- Born: Elizabeth J. Tasker; 12 July 1980 (age 46)
- Education: Durham University (MSci); Merton College, Oxford (DPhil)
- Scientific career
- Fields: Computational Astrophysics
- Workplaces: University of Florida; Columbia University; McMaster University; Hokkaido University; JAXA
- Thesis: Numerical simulations of the formation and evolution of galaxies (2005)
- Doctoral advisor: Greg Bryan
- Website: elizabethtasker.com

Elizabeth J. Tasker (born 12 July 1980) is a British astrophysicist and science writer.

Tasker is currently an associate professor at the Japan Aerospace Exploration Agency and is highly active in science communication. Her first book, The Planet Factory, was published by Bloomsbury in 2017.

== Early life and education ==
Tasker graduated from Durham University in 2002 with a MSci in theoretical physics. As an undergraduate, she won the 1999 The Daily Telegraph Young Science Writers Award.

Tasker moved to the University of Oxford for doctoral studies, where her supervisor was Greg Bryan. Her thesis, Numerical simulations of the formation and evolution of galaxies, was completed in 2005.

== Career and research ==
Tasker joined Columbia University as a postdoctoral research assistant, where she worked on simulations of star formation that incorporated feedback from supernovae. She has investigated whether stellar feedback results in the death of Giant Molecular Clouds. She spent three years at the University of Florida as the Theoretical Astrophysics Postdoctoral Fellow, before moving to McMaster University as a CITA National Fellow in 2009.

Tasker's research investigates how stars form in disc galaxies using computer simulations. She looks at how galaxy structure impacts the formation of stars, and how star formation drives galaxy evolution. She has argued for the need to evaluate the language around exoplanet ranking metrics. She joined Hokkaido University as an international tenure-track academic in 2011. She won the Hokkaido University President's Award for Education in 2014, 2015 and 2016. She was appointed to JAXA, the Japan Aerospace Exploration Agency, as an associate professor in 2016, working on hydrodynamical models of star and planet formation.

=== Science communication ===
Tasker is also a popular science writer. She has written for Scientific American, How It Works, Space.com, The Conversation and Astronomy. She has presented popular science lectures at the Communicating Astronomy with the Public conference, the Royal Institution and American Museum of Natural History. In 2015, Tasker presented How Did We Begin at TEDx Hokkaido University. She has spoken about the work of the Earth-Life Science Institute to the general public.

==== The Planet Factory ====
In 2017 Bloomsbury Publishing released Tasker's first book, The Planet Factory. The book was described as "brilliantly written" by Physics World and "splendidly readable and authoritative" by Caleb Scharf.

==== Planetary Diversity ====
Tasker co-authored and edited Planetary Diversity: Rocky planet processes and their observational signatures, an ebook aimed at space science researchers. It was published as a joint venture by the American Astronomical Society and the Institute of Physics in 2020.
