= Felix A. Aharonian =

Armenian physicist and astrophysicist

Felix Albert Aharonian (born 23 May 1952) is a physicist and astrophysicist. He is a recognized authority on the origin of cosmic rays, and has written books and research papers on astroparticle physics, and cosmology.

Born in Yerevan, Armenia (former USSR), Aharonian received his Ph.D. from the Moscow Engineering Physics Institute and is Professor of Astrophysics, Dublin Institute for Advanced Studies (DIAS), Dublin, Ireland and Head of High Energy Astrophysics Theory Group, Max Planck Institute for Nuclear Physics (MPIK), Heidelberg, Germany.

== Professional Activities ==
- Member, editorial board: International Journal of Modern Physics D
- Member: Armenian Astronomical Society
- Member: H.E.S.S. Collaboration Board.

== Honors ==
- 2005 Prize of the President of Armenia
- 2006 EU Descartes Prize (as a member of the H.E.S.S. collaboration)
- 2010 Rossi Prize (shared with Werner Hofmann and H. Völk)
- 2014 Viktor Ambartsumian International Prize in astronomy/astrophysics (with Igor Karachentsev and R. Brent Tully)

== Books ==
Very High Energy Cosmic Gamma Radiation: A Crucial Window on the Extreme Universe
hardcover: 495 pages, World Scientific (2004) ISBN 978-981-256-173-2

TeV gamma-ray astrophysics: theory and observations presented at the Heidelberg workshop, October 3-7, 1994
co-author with Heinrich J. Völk
hardcover, 450 pages, Kluwer Academic Publishers (1996) ISBN 978-0-7923-3854-3

Astrophysics at Very High Energies: Saas-Fee Advanced Course 40. Swiss Society for Astrophysics and Astronomy
with co-authors Lars Bergström, Charles Dermer, Roland Walter, Marc Türler
hardcover: 373 pages, Springer Science & Business Media (2013) ISBN 978-3-642-36134-0

== Selected literature ==
- The Crab Nebula and Pulsar between 500 GeV and 80 TeV: Observations with the HEGRA Stereoscopic Air Cerenkov Telescopes
- 40th Saas-Fee Course: Astrophysics at Very High Energies

== Bibliography ==
Contemporary Authors, vol. 13 (1984)
