= Brian Keith Tanner =

Physicist and academic

Prof. Brian Keith Tanner
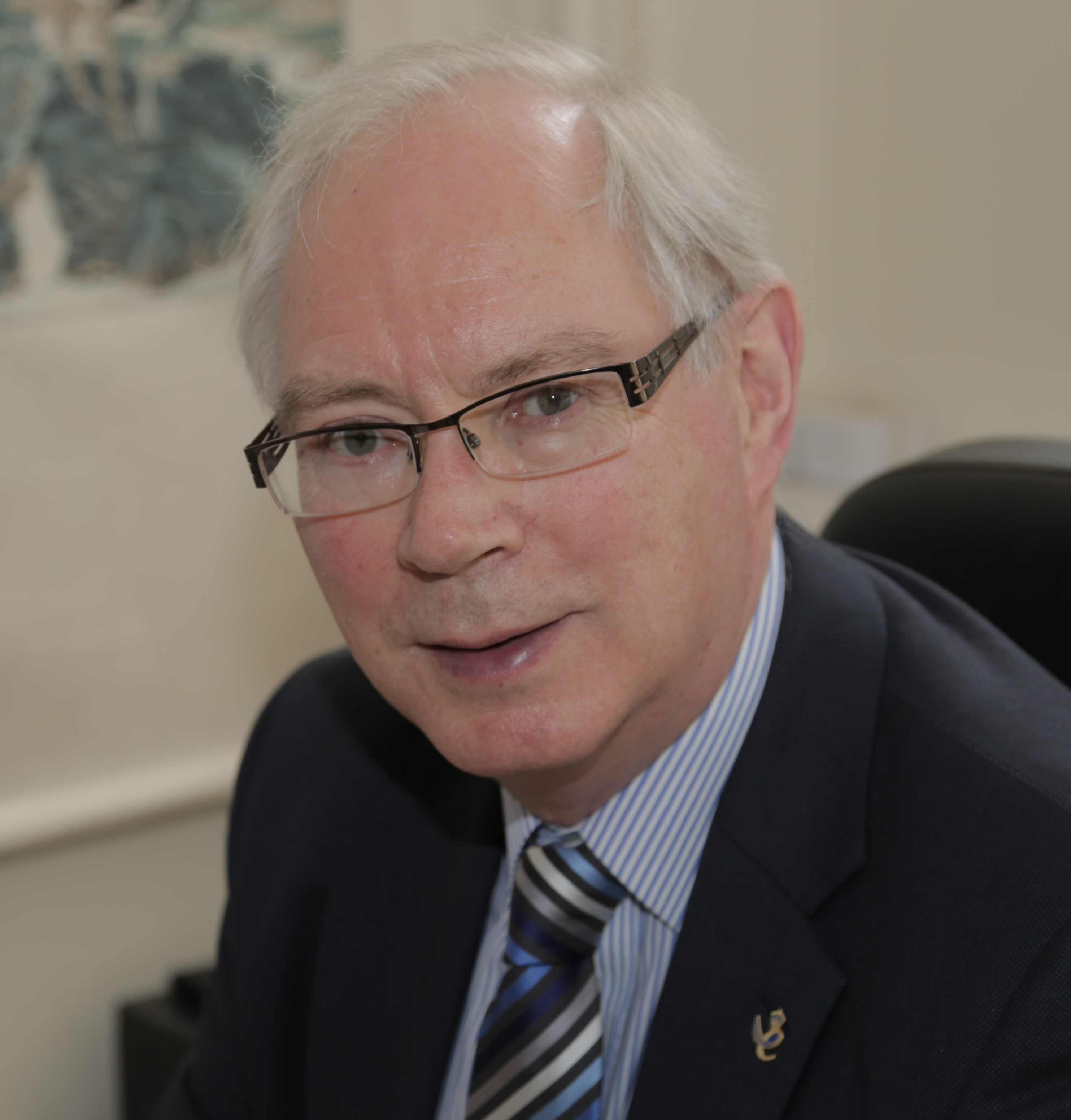
- Born: April 1947 (age 78–79); Northamptonshire
- Known for: Research and business applications of X-ray diffraction topography
- Spouse: Ruth Tanner
- Awards: Chartered Physicist; Fellow of the Institute of Physics; Fellow of the Higher Education Academy; Fellow of the Royal Society of Arts; Barrett Award of the International Center for Diffraction Data (2005); Queen's Award for Enterprise Promotion (2012); Gabor Medal (2014)
- Scientific career
- Fields: Physics
- Workplaces: Durham University; Linacre College, Oxford; Balliol College, Oxford
- Thesis: X-ray diffraction topography; methods and applications (1971)

Brian Keith Tanner CPhys, FRSA, FInstP, FHEA is a British physicist, currently Emeritus Professor of Physics and former Dean of Knowledge Transfer at Durham University.

== Early life ==
Brian Tanner grew up in Northamptonshire, attending Wellingborough Grammar School. He studied undergraduate physics at Balliol College, University of Oxford, where he went on to graduate with a DPhil in 1971 on 'X-ray diffraction topography; methods and applications'.

== Career ==
Tanner is best known for research and business applications of X-ray diffraction topography. Tanner has worked at the Department of Physics at Durham University since 1973, where he was made Professor of Physics in 1996 and was the University Dean of Knowledge Transfer from 2008 to 2016 until his retirement. He has published over 375 papers in international peer-reviewed journals and 4 books. In 1978 he co-founded Bede Scientific Instruments Ltd, since 2008 owned by Jordan Valley Semiconductors. From 2003 to 2015 he was a non-executive director of radiation detection solutions company Kromek, supplying medical imaging, civil nuclear, security screening and homeland security markets.

Professor Tanner was the first Director of the North East Centre for Science Enterprise, and served as chief scientific advisor of the North East Technology Park (NETPark) and chaired the County Durham Economic Partnership.

== Awards and honours ==
Tanner is a Chartered Physicist, a Fellow of the Institute of Physics, Fellow of the Higher Education Academy, and Fellow of the Royal Society of Arts Jointly awarded the 2005 Barrett Award of the International Center for Diffraction Data. Awarded the Queen's Award for Enterprise Promotion in 2012 for his work in promoting enterprise and business in the North East. In 2014, the Institute of Physics awarded Tanner the Gabor Medal for distinguished work in the application of physics in an industrial, commercial or business context.

== Personal life ==
Married to Ruth Tanner, formerly a Trustee and Deputy President of the Workers' Educational Association and currently secretary of the Cobweb Orchestra, about which she published a history in 2013. He has two sons: Rob is a teacher and Director of Cross-Curricular Learning at St Albans School and Tom is a climate change academic at SOAS University of London.
