= Stéphane Roux (physicist) =

French physicist

Stéphane Roux (born 1960) is a French physicist specializing in surface mechanics and fractures. He is director of research at the École normale supérieure de Cachan. He was awarded the Société française de physique annual prix Daniel Guinier and the Médaille d'argent of CNRS in 2006

- Disorder and Fracture (Nato Science Series B: (closed)) by J.C. Charmet, E. Guyon and Stéphane Roux (Jan 31, 1991)
