= Herschel Space Observatory =

ESA space telescope in service 2009–2013

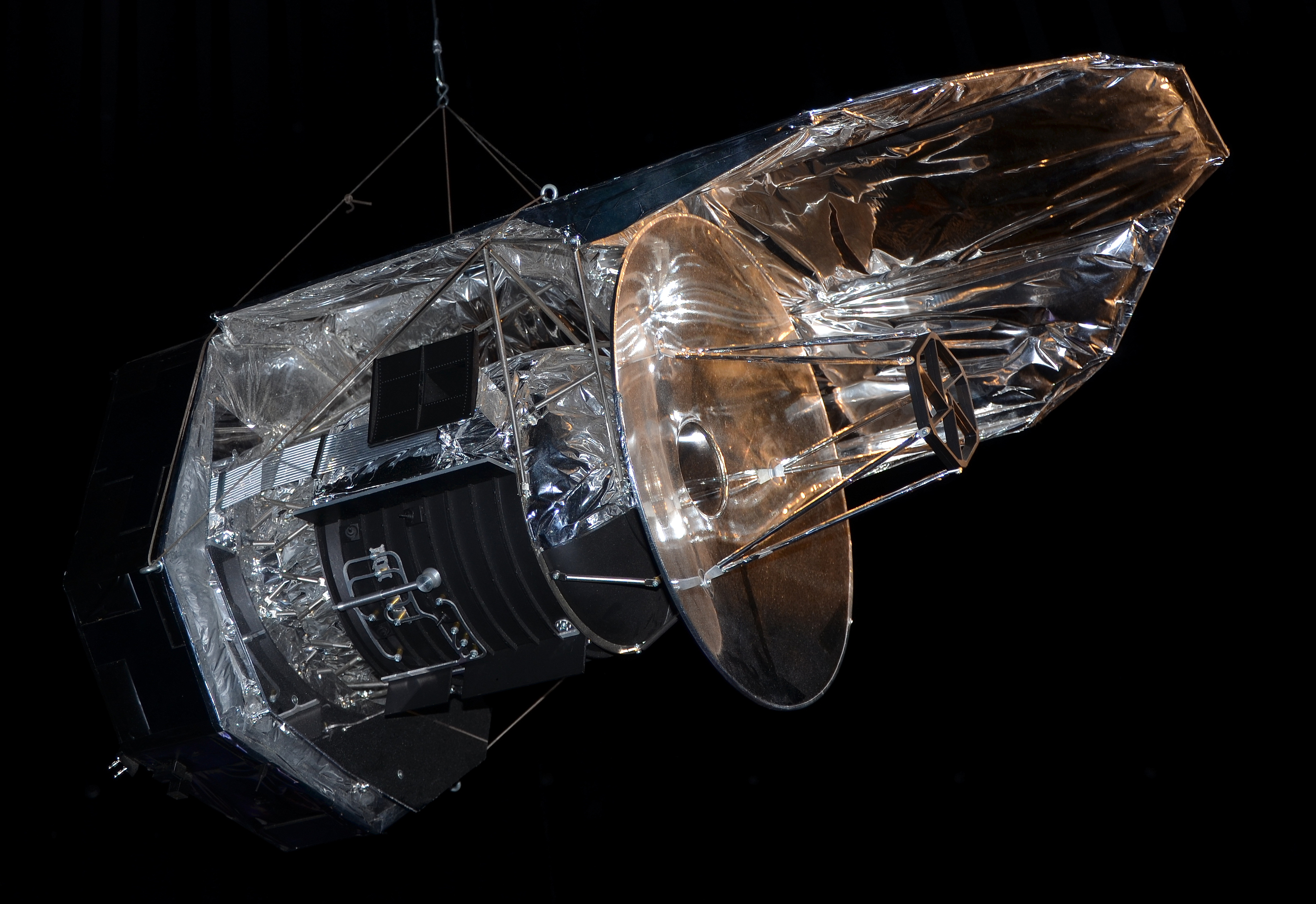
- Model of the Herschel Observatory
- Names: Far Infrared and Submillimetre Telescope
- Mission type: Space telescope
- Operator: ESA / NASA
- COSPAR ID: 2009-026K
- SATCAT no.: 34937
- Website: www.esa.int/herschel
- Mission duration: Planned: 3 years Final: 4 years, 1 month, 2 days

Spacecraft properties
- Manufacturer: Thales Alenia Space
- Launch mass: 3,400 kg (7,500 lb)
- Payload mass: Telescope: 315 kg (694 lb)
- Dimensions: 7.5 m × 4.0 m (25 ft × 13 ft)
- Power: 1 kW

Start of mission
- Launch date: 14 May 2009, 13:12:02 UTC
- Rocket: Ariane 5 ECA
- Launch site: Guiana Space Centre, French Guiana
- Contractor: Arianespace

End of mission
- Disposal: Decommissioned
- Deactivated: 17 June 2013, 12:25 UTC

Orbital parameters
- Reference system: L_{2} point 1,500,000 km (930,000 mi)
- Regime: Lissajous

Main telescope
- Type: Ritchey–Chrétien
- Diameter: 3.5 m (11 ft) f/0.5 (primary mirror)
- Focal length: 28.5 m (94 ft) f/8.7
- Collecting area: 9.6 m^{2} (103 sq ft)
- Wavelengths: 55 to 672 μm (far infrared)
Instruments
- HIFI: Heterodyne Instrument for the Far Infrared
- PACS: Photodetector Array Camera and Spectrometer
- SPIRE: Spectral and Photometric Imaging Receiver
- Contemporary ESA insignia (2000s) Horizon 2000 (Science Programme)

The Herschel Space Observatory was a space observatory built and operated by the European Space Agency (ESA). It was active from 2009 to 2013, and was the largest infrared telescope ever launched until the launch of the James Webb Space Telescope in 2021. Herschel carried a 3.5-metre (11.5 ft) mirror and instruments sensitive to the far infrared and submillimetre wavebands (55–672 μm). Herschel was the fourth and final cornerstone mission in the Horizon 2000 programme, following SOHO, Cluster II, XMM-Newton and Rosetta.

The observatory was carried into orbit by an Ariane 5 in May 2009, reaching the second Lagrangian point (L2) of the Earth–Sun system, 1,500,000 kilometres (930,000 mi) from Earth, about two months later. Herschel is named after Sir William Herschel, the discoverer of the infrared spectrum and planet Uranus, and his sister and collaborator Caroline Herschel.

The observatory was capable of seeing the coldest and dustiest objects in space; for example, cool cocoons where stars form and dusty galaxies just starting to bulk up with new stars. The observatory sifted through star-forming clouds—the "slow cookers" of star ingredients—to trace the path by which potentially life-forming molecules, such as water, form.

The telescope's lifespan was governed by the amount of coolant available for its instruments; when that coolant ran out, the instruments would stop functioning correctly. At the time of its launch, operations were estimated to last 3.5 years (to around the end of 2012). It continued to operate until 29 April 2013 15:20 UTC, when Herschel ran out of coolant.

NASA was a partner in the Herschel mission, with US participants contributing to the mission; providing mission-enabling instrument technology and sponsoring the NASA Herschel Science Center (NHSC) at the Infrared Processing and Analysis Center and the Herschel Data Search at the Infrared Science Archive.

== Development ==
In 1982 the Far Infrared and Sub-millimetre Telescope (FIRST) was proposed to ESA. The ESA long-term policy-plan "Horizon 2000", produced in 1984, called for a High Throughput Heterodyne Spectroscopy mission as one of its cornerstone missions. In 1986, FIRST was adopted as this cornerstone mission. It was selected for implementation in 1993, following an industrial study in 1992–1993. The mission concept was redesigned from Earth-orbit to the Lagrangian point L2, in light of experience gained from the Infrared Space Observatory [(2.5–240 μm) 1995–1998]. In 2000, FIRST was renamed Herschel. After being put out to tender in 2000, industrial activities began in 2001. Herschel was launched in 2009.

The Herschel mission cost €1,100 million. This figure includes spacecraft and payload, launch and mission expenses, and science operations.

== Science ==
Herschel specialised in collecting light from objects in the Solar System as well as the Milky Way and even extragalactic objects billions of light-years away, such as newborn galaxies, and was charged with four primary areas of investigation:

- Galaxy formation in the early universe and the evolution of galaxies;
- Star formation and its interaction with the interstellar medium;
- Chemical composition of atmospheres and surfaces of Solar System bodies, including planets, comets and moons;
- Molecular chemistry across the universe.

During the mission, Herschel "made over 35,000 scientific observations" and "amass[ed] more than 25,000 hours' worth of science data from about 600 different observing programs".

== Instrumentation ==
The mission involved the first space observatory to cover the full far infrared and submillimetre waveband. At 3.5 metres wide (11 ft), Herschel carried the largest optical telescope ever deployed in space. It was made not from glass but from sintered silicon carbide. The mirror's blank was manufactured by Boostec in Tarbes, France; ground and polished by Opteon Ltd. in Tuorla Observatory, Finland; and coated by vacuum deposition at the Calar Alto Observatory in Spain.

The light reflected by the mirror was focused onto three instruments, whose detectors were kept at temperatures below 2 K (−271 °C). The instruments were cooled with over 2,300 litres (510 imp gal; 610 US gal) of liquid helium, boiling away in a near vacuum at a temperature of approximately 1.4 K (−272 °C). The supply of helium on board the spacecraft was a fundamental limit to the operational lifetime of the space observatory; it was originally expected to be operational for at least three years.

Herschel carried three detectors:

PACS (Photodetecting Array Camera and Spectrometer)
An imaging camera and low-resolution spectrometer covering wavelengths from 55 to 210 micrometres, which was designed and built by the Max Planck Institute for Extraterrestrial Physics. The spectrometer had a spectral resolution between R=1000 and R=5000 and was able to detect signals as weak as −63 dB. It operated as an integral field spectrograph, combining spatial and spectral resolution. The imaging camera was able to image simultaneously in two bands (either 60–85/85–130 micrometres and 130–210 micrometres) with a detection limit of a few millijanskys.

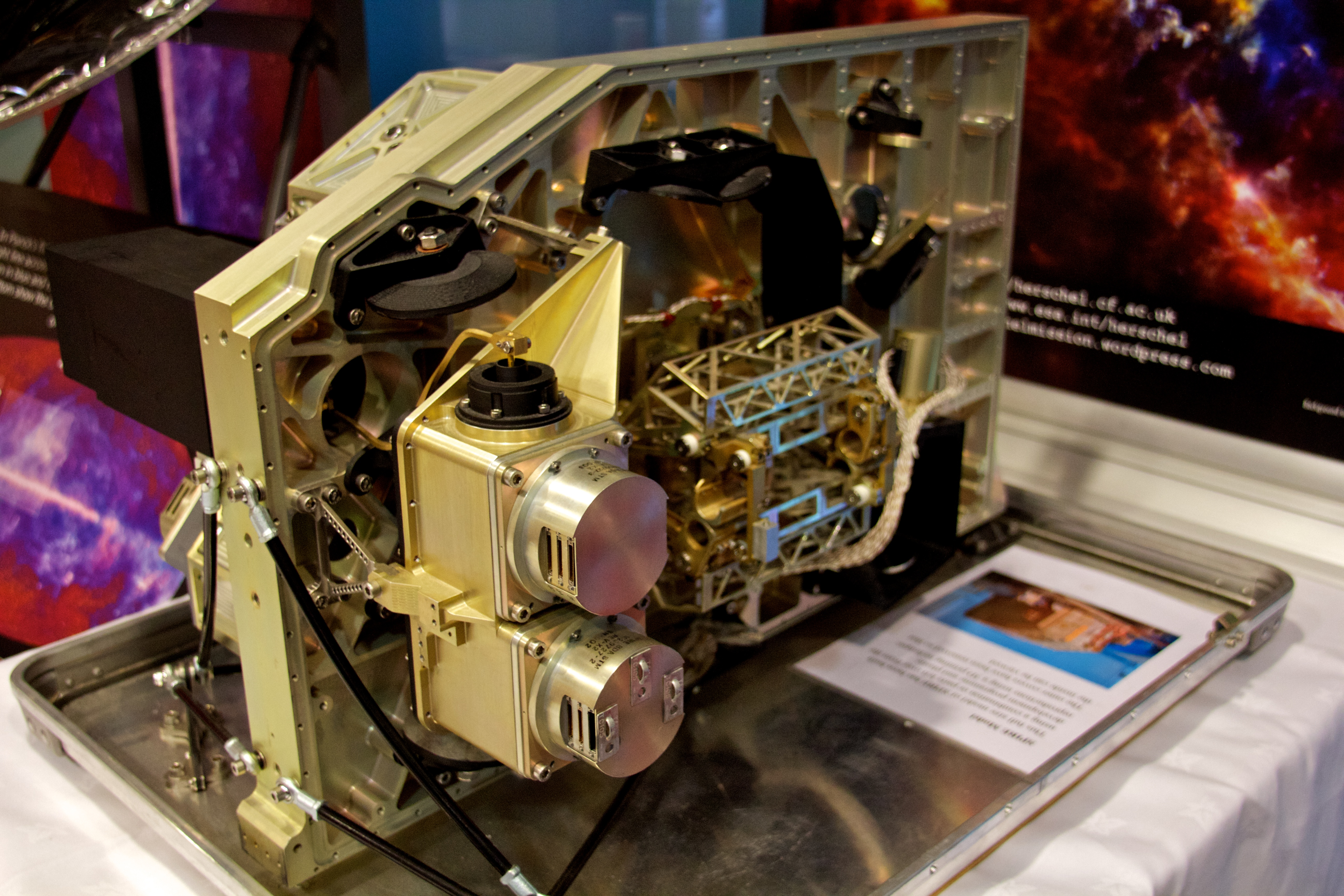
A model of the SPIRE instrument.

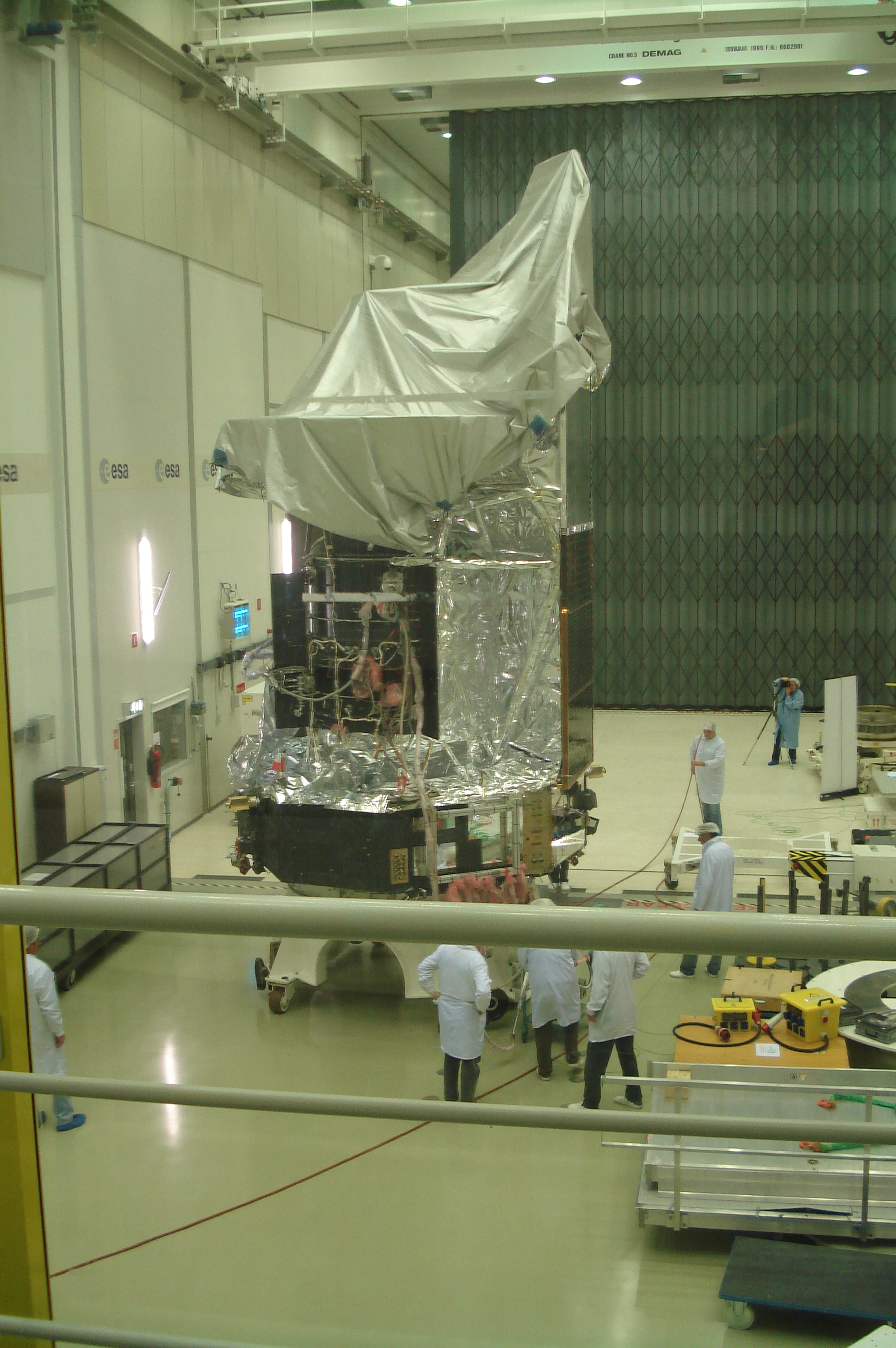
Herschel in a clean room

SPIRE (Spectral and Photometric Imaging Receiver)
An imaging camera and low-resolution spectrometer covering 194 to 672 micrometre wavelength. The spectrometer had a resolution between R=40 and R=1000 at a wavelength of 250 micrometres and was able to image point sources with brightnesses around 100 millijanskys (mJy) and extended sources with brightnesses of around 500 mJy. The imaging camera had three bands, centred at 250, 350 and 500 micrometres, each with 139, 88 and 43 pixels respectively. It was able to detect point sources with brightness above 2 mJy and between 4 and 9 mJy for extended sources. A prototype of the SPIRE imaging camera flew on the BLAST high-altitude balloon. NASA's Jet Propulsion Laboratory in Pasadena, Calif., developed and built the "spider web" bolometers for this instrument, which is 40 times more sensitive than previous versions. The Herschel-SPIRE instrument was built by an international consortium comprising more than 18 institutes from eight countries, of which Cardiff University was the lead institute.

HIFI (Heterodyne Instrument for the Far Infrared)
A heterodyne detector able to electronically separate radiation of different wavelengths, giving a spectral resolution as high as R=10^{7}. The spectrometer was operated within two wavelength bands, from 157 to 212 micrometres and from 240 to 625 micrometres. SRON Netherlands Institute for Space Research led the entire process of designing, constructing and testing HIFI. The HIFI Instrument Control Center, also under the leadership of SRON, was responsible for obtaining and analysing the data.

NASA developed and built the mixers, local oscillator chains and power amplifiers for this instrument. The NASA Herschel Science Center, part of the Infrared Processing and Analysis Center at the California Institute of Technology, also in Pasadena, has contributed science planning and data analysis software.

== Service module ==
A common service module (SVM) was designed and built by Thales Alenia Space in its Turin plant for the Herschel and Planck missions, as they were combined into one single program.

Structurally, the Herschel and Planck SVMs are very similar. Both SVMs are of octagonal shape and, for both, each panel is dedicated to accommodate a designated set of warm units, while taking into account the heat dissipation requirements of the different warm units, of the instruments, as well as the spacecraft.

Furthermore, on both spacecraft a common design has been achieved for the avionics systems, attitude control and measurement systems (ACMS), command and data management systems (CDMS), power subsystems and the tracking, telemetry, and command subsystem (TT&C).

All spacecraft units on the SVM are redundant.

=== Power subsystem ===
On each spacecraft, the power subsystem consists of the solar array, employing triple-junction solar cells, a battery and the power control unit (PCU). It is designed to interface with the 30 sections of each solar array, provide a regulated 28 V bus, distribute this power via protected outputs and to handle the battery charging and discharging.

For Herschel, the solar array is fixed on the bottom part of the baffle designed to protect the cryostat from the Sun. The three-axis attitude control system maintains this baffle in direction of the Sun. The top part of this baffle is covered with optical solar reflector (OSR) mirrors reflecting 98% of the Sun's energy, avoiding heating of the cryostat.

=== Attitude and orbit control ===
This function is performed by the attitude control computer (ACC) which is the platform for the ACMS. It is designed to fulfil the pointing and slewing requirements of the Herschel and Planck payload.

The Herschel spacecraft is three-axis stabilized. The absolute pointing error needs to be less than 3.7 arc seconds.

The main sensor of the line of sight in both spacecraft is the star tracker.

== Launch and orbit ==
Animation of Herschel Space Observatory's trajectory from 14 May 2009 to 31 August 2013 Herschel Space Observatory · Earth

The spacecraft, built in the Cannes Mandelieu Space Center, under Thales Alenia Space Contractorship, was successfully launched from the Guiana Space Centre in French Guiana at 13:12:02 UTC on 14 May 2009, aboard an Ariane 5 rocket, along with the Planck spacecraft, and placed on a very elliptical orbit on its way towards the second Lagrangian point. The orbit's perigee was 270.0 km (intended 270.0±4.5), apogee 1,197,080 km (intended 1193622±151800), inclination 5.99 deg (intended 6.00±0.06).

On 14 June 2009, ESA successfully sent the command for the cryocover to open which allowed the PACS system to see the sky and transmit images in a few weeks. The lid had to remain closed until the telescope was well into space to prevent contamination.

Five days later the first set of test photos, depicting M51 Group, was published by ESA.

In mid-July 2009, approximately sixty days after launch, it entered a halo orbit of 800,000 km average radius around the second Lagrangian point (L2) of the Earth-Sun system, 1.5 million kilometres from the Earth.

== Discoveries ==
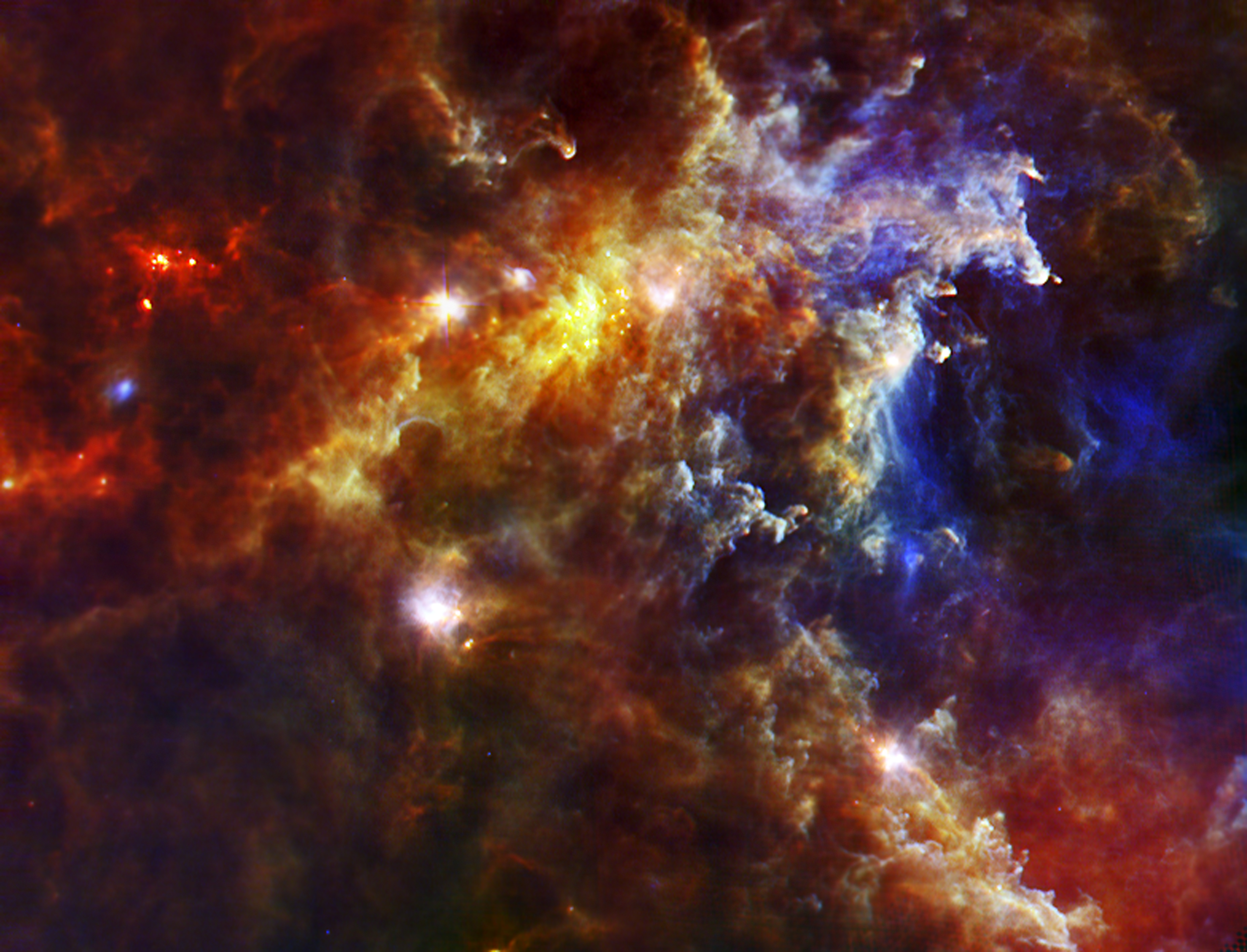
Rosette Nebula image captured by Herschel

On 21 July 2009, Herschel commissioning was declared successful, allowing the start of the operational phase. A formal handover of the overall responsibility of Herschel was declared from the program manager Thomas Passvogel to the mission manager Johannes Riedinger.

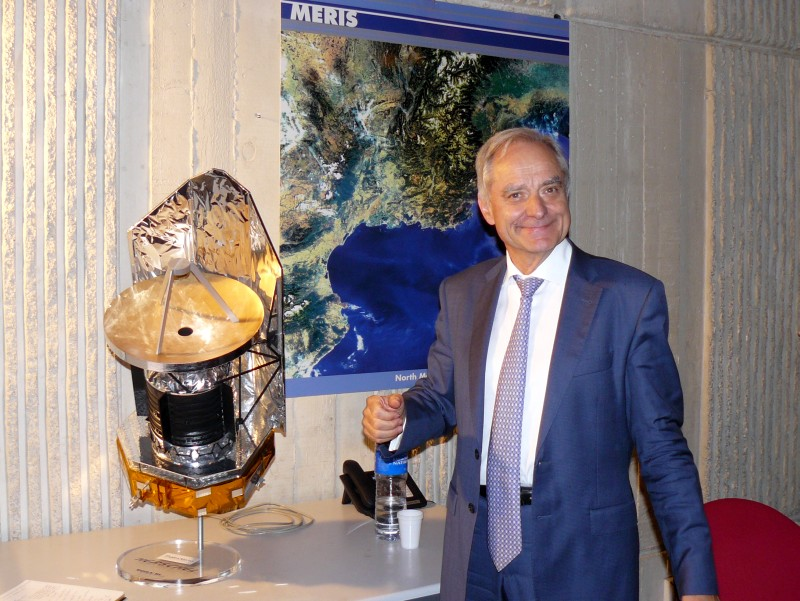
André Brahic, astronomer, during a conference in the Cannes Mandelieu Space Center

Herschel was instrumental in the discovery of an unknown and unexpected step in the star forming process. The initial confirmation and later verification via help from ground-based telescopes of a vast hole of empty space, previously believed to be a dark nebula, in the area of NGC 1999 shed new light in the way newly forming star regions discard the material which surround them.

In July 2010 a special issue of Astronomy and Astrophysics was published with 152 papers on initial results from the observatory.

A second special issue of Astronomy and Astrophysics was published in October 2010 concerning the sole HIFI instrument, due its technical failure which took it down over 6 months between August 2009 and February 2010.

It was reported on 1 August 2011, that molecular oxygen had been definitively confirmed in space with the Herschel Space Telescope, the second time scientists have found the molecule in space. It had been previously reported by the Odin team.

An October 2011 report published in Nature states that Herschel's measurements of deuterium levels in the comet Hartley 2 suggests that much of Earth's water could have initially come from cometary impacts. On 20 October 2011, it was reported that oceans-worth of cold water vapor had been discovered in the accretion disc of a young star. Unlike warm water vapor, previously detected near forming stars, cold water vapor would be capable of forming comets which then could bring water to inner planets, as is theorized for the origin of water on Earth.

On 18 April 2013, the Herschel team announced in another Nature paper that it had located an exceptional starburst galaxy which produced over 2,000 solar masses of stars a year. The galaxy, termed HFLS3, is located at z = 6.34, originating only 880 million years after the Big Bang.

Just days before the end of its mission, ESA announced that Herschel's observations had led to the conclusion that water on Jupiter had been delivered as a result of the collision of Comet Shoemaker–Levy 9 in 1994.

On 22 January 2014, ESA scientists using Herschel data reported the detection, for the first definitive time, of water vapor on the dwarf planet, Ceres, largest object in the asteroid belt. The finding is unexpected because comets, not asteroids, are typically considered to "sprout jets and plumes". According to one of the scientists, "The lines are becoming more and more blurred between comets and asteroids."

== End of mission ==
Animation of Herschel Space Observatory's trajectory around Earth from 14 May 2009 to 31 December 2049 Herschel Space Observatory · Earth

On 29 April 2013, ESA announced that Herschel's supply of liquid helium, used to cool the instruments and detectors on board, had been depleted, thus ending its mission. At the time of the announcement, Herschel was approximately 1.5 million km from Earth. Because Herschel's orbit at the L2 point is unstable, ESA wanted to guide the craft on a known trajectory. ESA managers considered two options:

- Place Herschel into a heliocentric orbit where it would not encounter Earth for at least several hundred years.
- Guide Herschel on a course toward the Moon for a destructive high-speed collision that would help in the search for water at a lunar pole. Herschel would take about 100 days to reach the Moon.

The managers chose the first option because it was less costly.

On 17 June 2013, Herschel was fully deactivated, with its fuel tanks forcibly depleted and the onboard computer programmed to cease communications with Earth. The final command, which severed communications, was sent from European Space Operations Centre (ESOC) at 12:25 UTC.

The mission's post-operations phase continued until 2017. The main tasks were consolidation and refinement of instrument calibration, to improve data quality, and data processing, to create a body of scientifically validated data.

=== After Herschel ===
Following Herschel's demise, some European astronomers have pushed for the joint European-Japanese SPICA far-infrared observatory project, as well as ESA's continued partnership in NASA's James Webb Space Telescope. James Webb covers the near-infrared spectrum from 0.6 to 28.5 μm, and SPICA covers the mid-to-far-infrared spectral range between 12 and 230 μm. While Herschel's dependence on liquid helium coolant limited the design life to around three years, SPICA would have used mechanical Joule-Thomson coolers to sustain cryogenic temperatures for a longer period of time. SPICA's sensitivity was to be two orders of magnitude higher than Herschel.

NASA's proposed Origins Space Telescope (OST) would also observe in the far-infrared band of light. Europe is leading the study for one of OST's five instruments, the Heterodyne Receiver for OST (HERO).

== See also ==
- Atacama Large Millimeter Array (ALMA)
- Spitzer Space Telescope
- List of largest infrared telescopes
- List of largest optical reflecting telescopes
- List of space telescopes
