= Cryochemistry =

Branch of chemistry

Cryochemistry is the study of chemical interactions at temperatures below −150 °C (−238 °F; 123 K). It is derived from the Greek word cryos, meaning 'cold'. It overlaps with many other sciences, including chemistry, cryobiology, condensed matter physics, and even astrochemistry.

Cryochemistry has been a topic of interest since liquid nitrogen, which freezes at −210°C, became commonly available. Cryogenic-temperature chemical interactions are an important mechanism for studying the detailed pathways of chemical reactions by reducing the confusion introduced by thermal fluctuations. Cryochemistry forms the foundation for cryobiology, which uses slowed or stopped biological processes for medical and research purposes.

== Low temperature behaviours ==
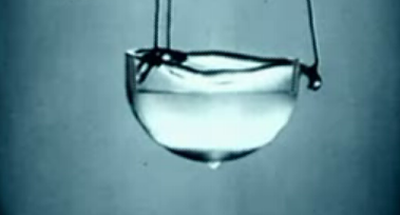
When cooled below the Lambda point (2.17 K or −270.98 °C at 1 atm), liquid helium exhibits properties of superfluidity

As a material cools, the relative motion of its component molecules/atoms decreases - its temperature decreases. Cooling can continue until all motion ceases, and its kinetic energy, or energy of motion, disappears. This condition is known as absolute zero and it forms the basis for the Kelvin temperature scale, which measures the temperature above absolute zero. Zero degrees Celsius (°C) coincides with 273 Kelvin.

At absolute zero most elements become a solid, but not all behave as predictably as this; for instance, helium becomes a highly unusual liquid. The chemistry between substances, however, does not disappear, even near absolute zero temperatures, since separated molecules/atom can always combine to lower their total energy. Almost every molecule or element will show different properties at different temperatures; if cold enough, some functions are lost entirely. Cryogenic chemistry can lead to very different results compared with standard chemistry, and new chemical routes to substances may be available at cryogenic temperatures, such as the formation of argon fluorohydride, which is only a stable compound at or below 17 K (−256.1 °C).

== Methods of cooling ==
One method that used to cool molecules to temperatures near absolute zero is laser cooling. In the Doppler cooling process, lasers are used to remove energy from electrons of a given molecule to slow or cool the molecule down. This method has applications in quantum mechanics and is related to particle traps and the Bose–Einstein condensate. All of these methods use a "trap" consisting of lasers pointed at opposite equatorial angles on a specific point in space. The wavelengths from the laser beams eventually hit the gaseous atoms and their outer spinning electrons. This clash of wavelengths decreases the kinetic energy state fraction by fraction to slow or cool the molecules down. Laser cooling has also been used to help improve atomic clocks and atom optics. Ultracold studies are not usually focused on chemical interactions, but rather on fundamental chemical properties.

Because of the extremely low temperatures, diagnosing the chemical status is a major issue when studying low temperature physics and chemistry. The primary techniques in use today are optical - many types of spectroscopy are available, but these require special apparatus with vacuum windows that provide room temperature access to cryogenic processes.

== See also ==
- Thermochemistry
- Cryogenics
- Bose–Einstein condensate
