= Institute of Advanced Study, Durham University =

Durham University research centre

Institute of Advanced Study
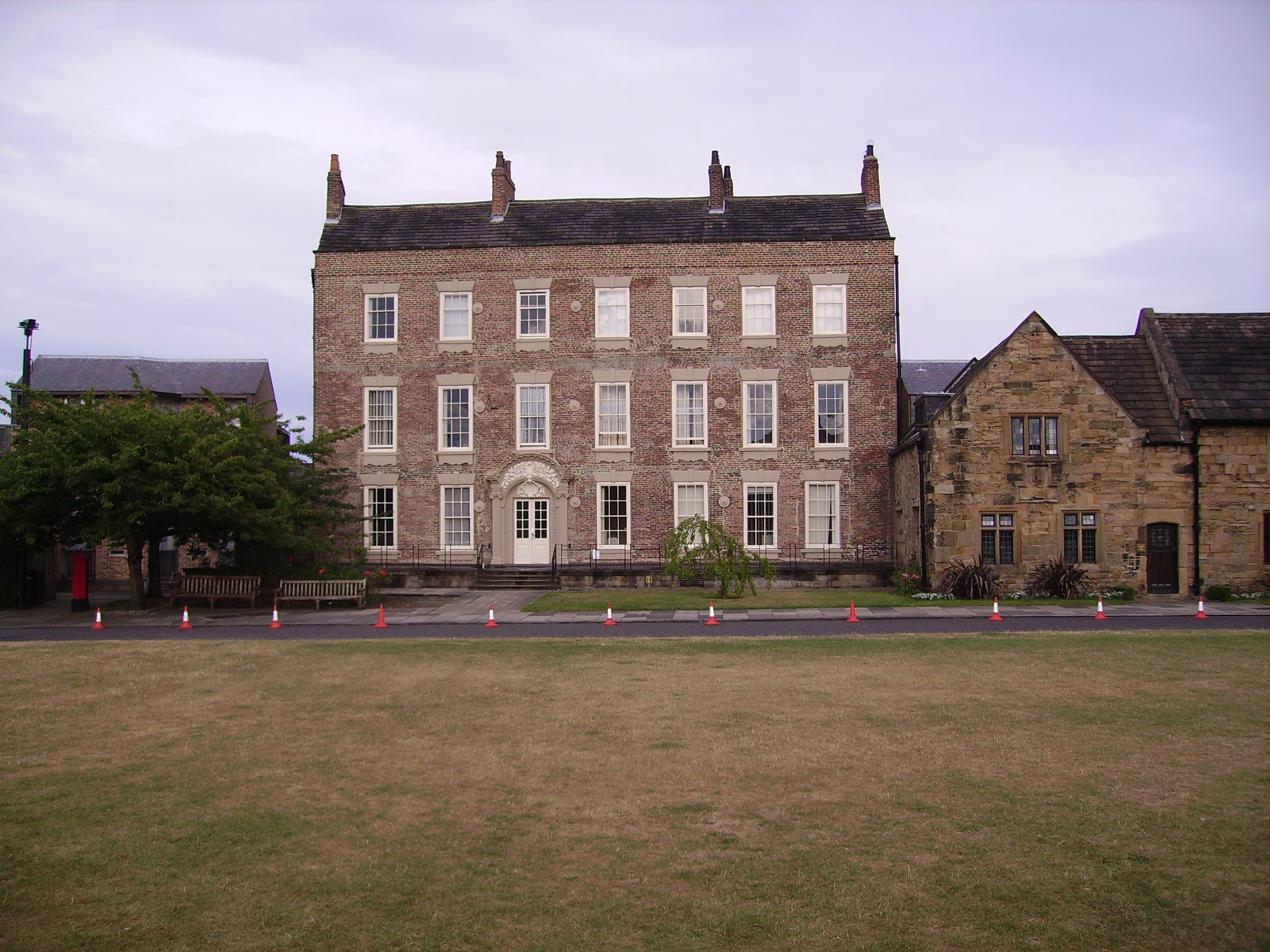
- The institute is housed in Bishop Cosin's Hall
- Established: 2006
- Parent institution: Durham University
- Academic affiliation: Consortium of Institutes of Advanced Study
- Director: Alex Easton
- Address: Cosin's Hall, Palace Green, Durham, DH1 3HB; 54°46′28″N 1°34′30″W
- Website: dur.ac.uk/ias
- Location in Durham, England

The Institute of Advanced Study (IAS) is an interdisciplinary research centre of Durham University. The IAS – set up to mark Durham's 175th anniversary – is intended to attract scholars and public figures from across the world to collaborate on 'agenda-setting research'. It is housed in the Grade II* listed Bishop Cosin's Hall, an early 18th-century building on Palace Green, Durham, within the Durham UNESCO World Heritage Site. The Institute accepted its first fellows in January 2006 and was formally inaugurated into the university in October that year.

== History ==
The institute was launched in 2006 with a debate between university chancellor Bill Bryson, historian Peter Watson and science journalist Matt Ridley. The topic for the first year was the legacy of Charles Darwin, culminating in a conference titled "What Makes a Racist?", with participants including John Hedley Brooke, Robin Dunbar, John Dupre, Anthony Monaco and Madeleine Bunting.

In 2009, the institute's work was showcased in a collection of short essays by experts from across the arts, science and humanities, Thinking About Almost Everything: New Ideas to Light up Minds. The same year, the institute hosted an exhibition of sculptures by Jane Alexander, On Being Human, at Durham Cathedral, inspired by the "Being Human" theme of the ISC in 2008/09, with an associated public debate held at Durham Town Hall. Later in that year, ISC fellow and artist-in-residence Ranjitsinh Gaekwad was commissioned to produce a sculpture, Vessels of Life, at the university's botanic garden, inspired by the ISC's 2009/10 theme of "Water".

In 2010, the institute became one of three British founder-members (with the School of Advanced Study at the University of London and the Centre for Research in the Arts, Social Sciences and Humanities at the University of Cambridge) of the global University-Based Institutes for Advanced Study network at a meeting at the Freiburg Institute for Advanced Studies.

In 2011, Indian filmmaker and IAS fellow Sudheer Gupta launched the film Black River Business contrasting the state of the river Yamuna in Delhi with the successful clean-up of the Tyne, Tees and Wear, that he made during his fellowship at the institute.

In 2015, the institute published Evaluating Interdisciplinary Research: A Practical Guide. In 2017, institute director Veronica Strang was appointed to HEFCE's interdisciplinary advisory panel, in what she called an "acknowledgement of the IAS’s contribution to thinking about interdisciplinarity". This was set up in 2017 to advise on how to address issues encountered by interdisciplinary research in the Research Excellence Framework (REF), which had been highlighted in 2016 by the Stern Review following the 2014 REF. In a 2018 conference on the future of the humanities, Strang, speaking as the director of the IAS, stressed the need for interdisciplinary research and for interdisciplinary centres to be academically and managerially independent from faculties, and to have representation on core institutional bodies and support from senior leadership.

In the 2018/19 academic year, the IAS changed the structure of its research programme from concentrating on a single overarching theme for a year to supporting four major research projects each year.

A major research project on Ukraine in Michaelmas (autumn) term 2004 involving researchers from Durham and IAS fellows from Ukraine contributed to the establishment of Durham University's Centre for the Study of Ukraine in 2025.

From January 2025, the IAS at Durham, the Swedish Collegium for Advanced Study in Uppsala and the College of Fellows at the University of Tübingen have hosted visiting academics from other universities in the Matariki Network of Universities. The IAS also had a long-term collaborative projects with the Tübingen College of Fellows from 2024 to 2026.

== Management ==
The IAS is run by a director and four co-directors, each linked to one of Durham University's four faculties. An advisory council consisting of people with experience of interdisciplinary research supports the IAS.

== Activities ==
IAS activity is based around research projects across the sciences, social sciences, business and humanities. These projects are chosen to provide an interdisciplinary perspective on important questions. Fellows selected by the university advance their own research, engage with academic departments, deliver public lectures and seminars, and contribute to research projects across the university.

Prior to 2018/19, the institute had an annual theme for its activities, beginning with the "Legacy of Darwin" in 2006/07 as a way of exploring the impact of Darwinian thought on multiple academic subjects. Since 2018/19, the institute has instead supported major projects, and smaller development projects, across disciplines at Durham University. Some fellows are associated with these projects, whilst others remain welcome to come to Durham through an open competition. In this way, the institute aims to help support, develop, and grow ideas across Durham University which offer novel perspectives on important topics.

The institute is a member of the Consortium of Institutes of Advanced Study in the UK and Ireland and the global University-Based Institutes of Advanced Study network, and also works with other institutes of advanced study within the global Matariki Network of Universities.

== Fellowships ==
The IAS offers fellowships to UK and international scholars. The fellowships each last three months, with two cohorts of 10 participants joining in January and October. Applicants may be from any academic discipline or professional background, though preference is given to those applying from overseas.

Each fellow becomes a member of one of the university's colleges. As well as accommodation, college membership also entails inclusion with the Senior Common Room and access to formal dinners and events. Every IAS Fellow, regardless of college affiliation, also receives honorary membership of the University College Senior Common Room and the right to take occasional meals at the college.

Academic members of Durham University may become associate fellows of the institute, and the IAS took over administration of the university's internal Christopherson Knott Fellowship in 2006. The IAS also hosts other fellowships, including the Sir Harry Evans Global Fellowship, launched in 2023, and the Addison Wheeler Fellowship for early-career researchers, endowed in 1967. The Durham–European Union COFUND fellowships were hosted at the IAS from 2011 until Britain left the EU in 2019. The institute hosted two CARA fellows, sponsored by the Council for At-Risk Academics, from 2023 to 2025, during the Russo-Ukrainian war.

=== Notable fellows ===
- Barbara Adam (IAS fellow 2010)
- Atholl Anderson (IAS fellow 2007)
- Richard Arculus (IAS fellow 2009)
- John Hedley Brooke (IAS fellow 2007)
- Jane E. Buikstra (IAS fellow 2006)
- David Campbell (IAS fellow 2009)
- Mary Carruthers (IAS fellow 2010)
- Nancy Cartwright (IAS fellow 2007)
- Iain Michael Chambers (IAS fellow 2009)
- Stewart Clegg (IAS fellow 2010)
- Lorraine Code (IAS fellow 2007)
- Andrew Crumey (IAS fellow 2011)
- Bryan R. Cullen (IAS fellow 2007)
- Penelope Deutscher (IAS fellow 2006)
- John Dupré (IAS fellow 2007)
- Mikhail Epstein (IAS fellow 2011)
- Michael Fellows (IAS fellow 2006)
- Ranjitsinh Pratapsinh Gaekwad (IAS fellow 2009)
- Chris Gollon (IAS fellow 2009)
- Monica Grady (IAS fellow 2010)
- Barbara Graziosi (IAS fellow 2010)
- Robert Hariman (IAS fellow 2008)
- Martin Harwit (IAS fellow 2007)
- Stefan Helmreich (IAS fellow 2010)
- Zoltán Kövecses (IAS fellow 2008)
- Russell Jacoby (IAS fellow 2010)
- J. Stephen Lansing (IAS fellow 2007)
- Donald MacKenzie (IAS fellow 2007)
- Mahmood Mamdani (IAS fellow 2008)
- Eduardo Mendieta (IAS fellow 2009)
- Henrietta Mondry (IAS fellow 2010)
- James Moore (IAS fellow 2006)
- Tom Nairn (IAS fellow 2009)
- Paul O'Brien (IAS fellow 2011)
- Adi Ophir (IAS fellow 2009)
- Paul Ormerod (IAS fellow 2007)
- Andrew Pickering (IAS fellow 2010)
- Jonathon Porritt (IAS fellow 2011)
- Roland Robertson (IAS fellow 2010)
- Didier Sornette (IAS fellow 2007)
- David C. Stark (IAS fellow 2007)
- Veronica Strang (IAS fellow 2009)
- Marilyn Strathern (IAS fellow 2010)
- Ezio Todini (IAS fellow 2009)
- Mark Turner (IAS fellow 2008)
- Eric Winsberg (IAS fellow 2008)
- Rachael Wiseman (Addison Wheeler fellow 2014)

== See also ==
- Radcliffe Institute for Advanced Study
- Institute for Advanced Study
- Some Institutes for Advanced Study
- Institute for Advanced Study, Berlin
