= Sacred waters =

Sacred natural sites involving water

Sacred waters are sacred natural sites characterized by tangible topographical land formations such as rivers, lakes, springs, reservoirs, and oceans, as opposed to holy water which is water elevated with the sacramental blessing of a cleric. These organic bodies of water have attained religious significance not from the modern alteration or blessing, but were sanctified through mythological or historical figures. Sacred waters have been exploited for cleansing, healing, initiations, and death rites.

Ubiquitous and perpetual fixations with water occur across religious traditions. It tends to be a central element in the creations accounts of almost every culture with mythological, cosmological, and theological myths. In this way, many groups characterize water as "living water", or the "water of life". This means that it gives life and is the fundamental element from which life arises. Each religious or cultural group that feature waters as sacred substances tends to favor certain categorizations of some waters more than others, usually those that are most accessible to them and that best integrate into their rituals.

== Rivers ==
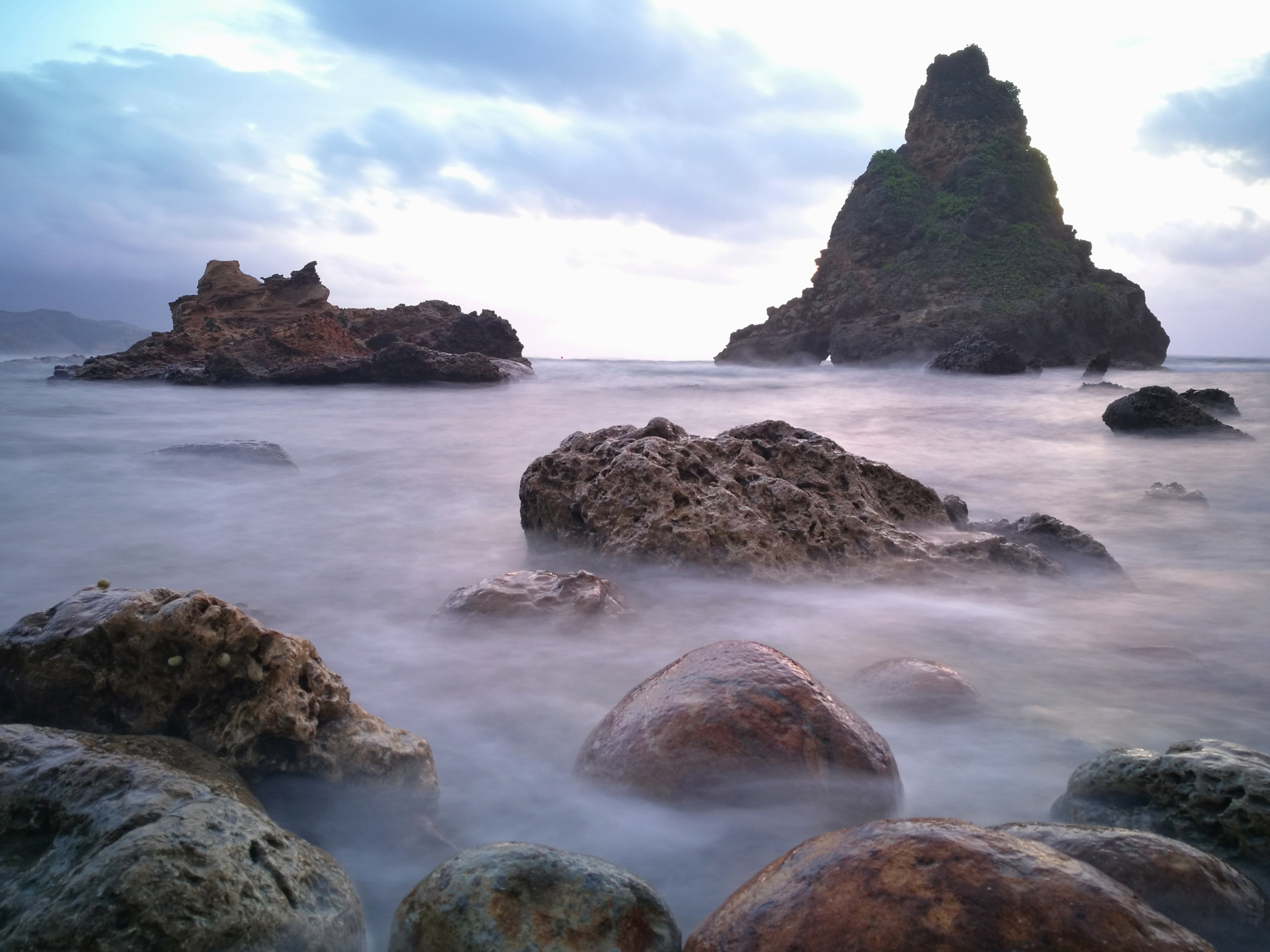
The Diura Fishing Village in Batanes

=== Ganges River ===
While all rivers in Hinduism are sacred, the Ganges River (Ganga) is particularly revered. In the Vedic myths, the goddess Ganga descended upon the earth to purify and prepare the dead. The Ganges in India is seen as the physical embodiment of this goddess. Since the river waters are regarded as both inherently pure themselves and as having major purificatory qualities, people come to bathe in them, drink from them, leave offerings for them, and give their physical remains to them.

The Ganges is said to purify the soul of negative karma, corporeal sins, and even impurities from previous lives. At sunrise along the Ganges, pilgrims descend the ghat steps to drink of the waters, bathe themselves in the waters and perform ablutions where they submerge their entire bodies. These practitioners desire to imbibe and surround themselves with the Ganges’s waters so that they can be purified. Hindu conceptualizations of the sacred are fluid and renewable. Purity and pollution exist upon a continuum where most entities, including people, can become sacred and then become stagnated and full of sin once again. Performing these rituals is also an act to become closer to the Hindu deities, and ultimately the Divine.

The Ganges is one of the most highly favored sites for funerary rituals in India. It is presumed that if a deceased person is cleansed by the Ganges, it will help liberate their soul, or expedite the number of lives they need to achieve this. In the traditional funerary ceremony, a dead person is placed upon a funeral pyre until the body becomes cremated, then the ashes are sent upon the river. Many Hindus go to great lengths to purify themselves one last time before death. When this is not possible, family members will actually mail the ashes to a priest so that he can perform the ceremony of entering the waters.

Manu, the mythic law giver, gave directives and prohibitions regarding the river: “impure objects like urine, feces, spit; or anything which has these elements, blood, or poison should not be cast into the water”. Few or none of these directives hold forth along most places down the Ganges today. As the Ganges River remains interwoven into daily existence, Hindus are vulnerable to urban contamination.

== Lakes and underground water ==
=== Lake Titicaca ===
Lake Titicaca is widely known as being a sacred place for the Inca people. The Inca Empire origins lie in Lake Titicaca. Ancient Incan myths describe the Incas as being blessed by the sun because the sun first emerged from Lake Titicaca. Since then, the sun organizes social order and the movement of the sun organizes rituals and gatherings. The first emergence of people in the time of the sun emergence is said to be the elite in their caste system. The origin of the elite was and continues to be contested among the people on the Island of Lake Titicaca. Thus, creating competition to become part of the elite rank. In recent times, the pollution of Lake Titicaca has built up and caused an increase of green algae. The people of Lake Titicaca Special Projects continuously create ways to bring awareness to the importance of a clean lake for their society.

=== Chichen Itza ===
The ancient Maya people valued social order and their society flourished because of the structure of their order. The ancient Maya strived and focused their actions on pleasing their many gods. Essentially, the Maya believed that the world consisted of three layers: the watery underworld, the middle earthly realm, and the sky realm. The Maya viewed bodies of water as a direct connection to the watery underworld and underground water obtained through a cave as an even better connection to spirits and deities. Cenotes are very important to the Mayas. The famous Sacred Cenote at Chichen Itza proves to be important with the many findings of artifacts and skeletal remains. Sacrifices were common at this site among the ancient Maya. Different people were sacrificed and findings show that most of the people were men and children. Like any archeological site, looting is a problem in preserving and studying the cenote at Chichen Itza.

=== Black Mesa ===
The Navajo and Hopi people have long embraced the water underneath and around the Black Mesa area as sacred to their people. The people have long lived around and became dependent on springs and wells of the Black Mesa. These waters are the only source of drinking water, water for livestock, and water for agriculture for the Navajo and Hopi people. In respect for the water, these people carryout religious and ceremonial tributes to the water of the Black Mesa. These waters have organized their people around the Black Mesa and resulted in the reliance of the waters for all aspects of their lives. With the emergence of Peabody Energy came threats to the preservation of their sacred water. Peabody Energy pumps water out from underneath the Black Mesa to transport their mining minerals. In May 2002 the Navajo and Hopi people from northeastern Arizona joined their people in St. Louis Missouri to fight against Peabody Energy and its shareholders. In January 2002 Peabody proposed and was granted the right to use thirty-two percent more Navajo Aquifer (Naquifer) water than they had already been using. The significant increase in water pumped out of the Naquifer, dramatically affected the drinkability of the water from the springs and wells connected to the Naquifer. Before the significant increase of pumping, the water was clean enough to drink without any kind of purification. Another result of the pumping is the noticeable drop in the water levels of the springs and wells. The drop in water levels was almost immediately recognized after Peabody was granted permission to pump out more water. This had caused disruption in the ceremonial and cultural lives of the Navajo and Hopi people as well as disruption to their farming.

== By culture and region ==
=== Germanic ===
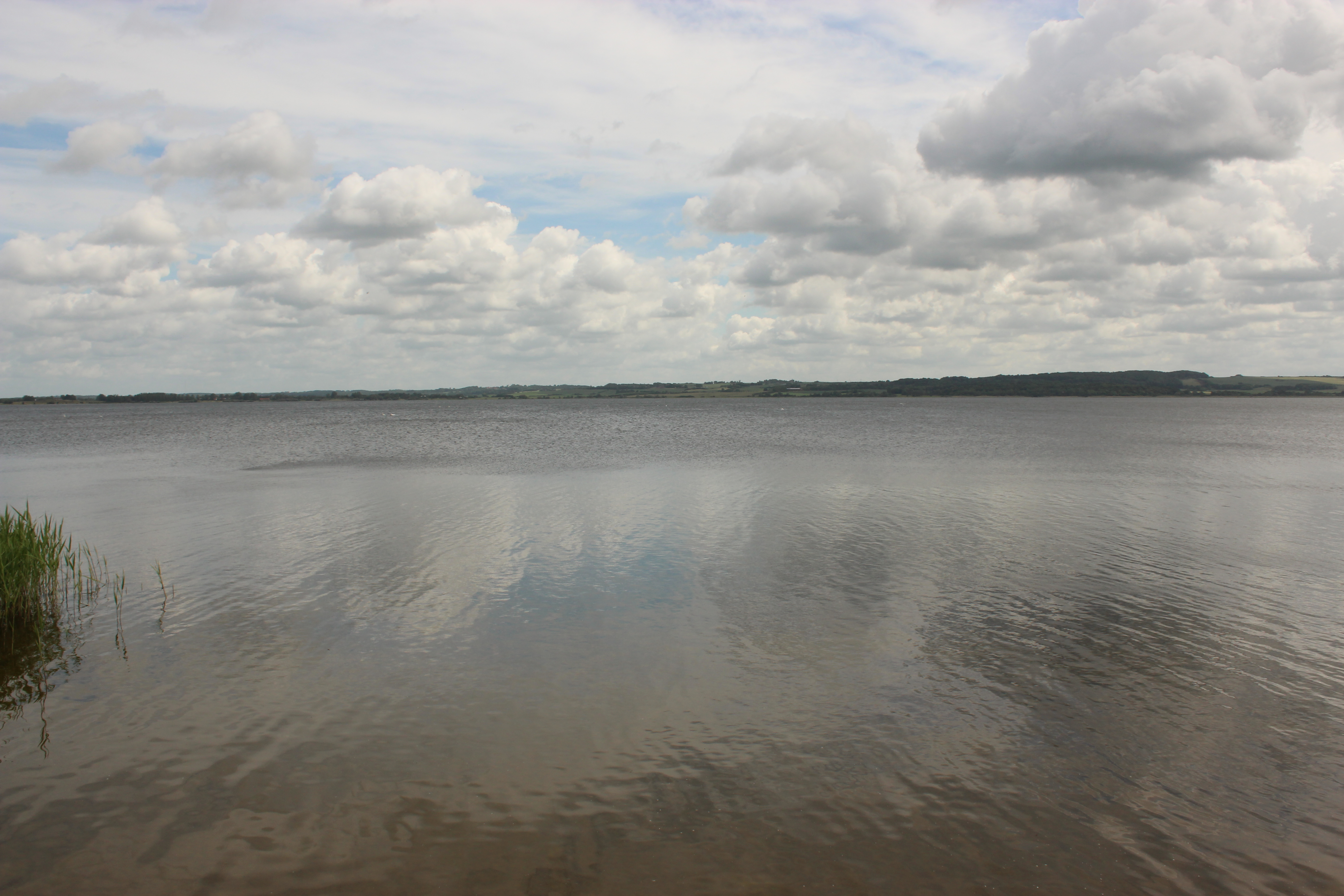
Tissø in Zealand, which was the site of a religious centre in the Viking Age

Watery places have been considered holy in Germanic cultures since the Nordic Bronze Age and used for diverse religious purposes, such as the depositions of items like the Dejbjerg wagon, the Gundestrup cauldron and the Vimose comb. These depositions are typically interpreted as gifts to gods, aiming to either give thanks for, or receive, positive outcomes such as good harvests, success in water or safe passage across the body of water. Bog bodies found in Germanic areas, such as the Grauballe Man, have often been interpreted as sacrifices, however alternative, but not mutually exclusive, proposals include that the person was executed as a punishment, that it was a form of normal burial or that they were placed there after death to stop them from coming back as a harmful being such as a draug. It is also important to note that human depositions are notably rare in comparison to other finds.

Many lakes and rivers have names that are linked to beings such as gods, including Tyesmere (Tīw's mere) in England and Tissø (Týr's or god's lake) in Denmark. The latter body of water was the site of a religious centre during the Viking Age. After the establishment of Christianity, many religious practices involving wetlands were made illegal but some others were incorporated and adapted into the new religion, such as the use of holy wells and the conception of water as a liminal place where supernatural beings could be encountered.

=== New Zealand ===
The Whanganui River, a major river in the North Island of New Zealand, has special status owing to its importance to the region's Māori people. In March 2017 it became the world's second natural resource (after Te Urewera) to be given its own legal identity, with the rights, duties and liabilities of a legal person.

=== African ===
The Osun River is an example of a waterbody considered sacred in Nigeria. It is a central figure in Yoruba spirituality symbolizing fertility, love and beauty. The river is named after the deity Oṣun, one of the river goddesses in Yorubaland, who is revered for her protective and healing properties. The Osun River flows through the Osun-Osoghbo Sacred Grove, a UNESCO World Heritage site dedicated to the deity from which the river takes its name. The Groove is the site of the annual Osun-Osogbo Festival which attracts thousands of pilgrims within and outside Nigeria.

Another example of a sacred water in Africa is Lake Tana located in Ethiopia. Lake Tana is the source of the Blue Nile and is considered a frontier to the ancient monastic traditions of the Ethiopian Orthodox Tewahedo Church. The lake contains a number of islands that house ancient monasteries that preserve sacred manuscripts, religious relics, and centuries-old frescoes.

Lake Bosumtwi is sacred to the Ashanti people of Ghana. It is believed to be a resting place for souls on their journey to the afterlife.

== Further examples ==
- Godavari River – River in south-central India
- Holy Brook – Stream, probably partly artificial, in the United Kingdom
- Jordan River – River that flows to the Dead Sea
- Krishna River – River in southern India
- Gosaikunda – Lake in Nepal's Langtang National Park
- Lake Guatavita – Lake in Cundinamarca Department, Colombia
- Narmada River – River in central India
- Nile – Major river in northeast Africa
- Silwan – Palestinian neighborhood in East Jerusalem, site of a sacred spring (Ayn Silwan)
- Zamzam Well – Well in the Masjid al-Haram in Mecca

== See also ==
- Holy well – Well or spring revered in a religious context
- Living Water – Biblical term
- Misogi – Shinto practice
- Temple tank – Wells or reservoirs built as part of the temple complex near Indian temples
- Theertham – Sacred water linked to a Hindu temple
- Water and religion
- Water rites – Activities performed according to a set sequence
- Yardna – Rivers in Mandaeism

== Bibliography ==
- Altman, Nathaniel (2002). Sacred Water: The Spiritual Source of Life. New Jersey: HiddenSpring.
- Alley, Kelly D. (2008). "Images of Waste and Purification on the Banks of the Ganga". City & Society. 10 (1): 167–182. doi:10.1525/city.1998.10.1.167.
- Bauer, Brian; Seddon, Matthew T. (1998). "The Sanctuary of Titicaca: Where the Sun Returns to Earth". Latin American Antiquity. 9 (3): 240–258. doi:10.2307/971730. JSTOR 971730. S2CID 163867549.
- Brothwell, D. (1996). "European bog bodies: Current state of research and preservation". Human Mummies. The Man in the Ice. Vol. 3. Springer. pp. 161–172. doi:10.1007/978-3-7091-6565-2_16. ISBN 978-3-7091-7352-7.
- Bruhns, Karen; Stothert, Karen E. (1999). Women in Ancient America. Oklahoma: University of Oklahoma Press.
- Eriksen, Listen Original Articles Don’t all mothers love their children? Deposited infants as animate objects in the Scandinavian Iron Age Marianne Hem (2017). "Don't all mothers love their children? Deposited infants as animate objects in the Scandinavian Iron Age". World Archaeology. 49 (3): 338–356. doi:10.1080/00438243.2017.1340189. hdl:10852/65628. S2CID 197856941.
- Haberman, David L. (2006). River of Lover in an Age of Pollution: The Yamuna River of Northern India. Berkeley: University of California Press.
- Hammer, Joshua (2007). "A Prayer for the Ganges". Smithsonian Magazine. 38 (8): 74–82.
- Holston, M. (2008). "Joint Action Protects Lake Titicaca". Americas. 60 (6): 42–43.
- Looijenga, Tineke (1 January 2003). "On the Origin of Runes". Texts & Contexts of the Oldest Runic Inscriptions. Brill. pp. 78–104. doi:10.1163/9789047401285_006. ISBN 9789004123960. S2CID 161898526.
- Lamb, Ramdas (2008). "Sacred". In Mittal, Sushil; Thursby, Gene (eds.). Studying Hinduism: Key Concepts and Methods. London: Routledge.
- Lee, Tanya (2002). "Hopi and Navajo People Confront Peabody Energy on Sacred Water Destruction". The Native Voice: The Women’s Voice.
- Lund, Julie (2010). "Chapter 3, At the Water's Edge". Signals of Belief in Early England: Anglo-Saxon Paganism Revisited. Oxbow Books. ISBN 978-1-84217-395-4. JSTOR j.ctt1cd0nf9.9.
- McClaymond, Kathryn (2008). "Ritual". In Mittal, Sushil; Gene, Thursby (eds.). Studying Hinduism: Key Concepts and Methods. London: Routledge.
- Michaels, Axel (2004). Harshaw, Barbara (ed.). Hinduism: Past and Present. Princeton: Princeton University Press.
- Narayanan, Vasudha (2001). "Water, Wood, and Wisdom: Ecological Perspectives from the Hindu Traditions". Daedalus. 130 (4): 179–206. ISSN 0011-5266. JSTOR 20027723.
- Monikander, Anne (2010). Våld och vatten : Våtmarkskult vid Skedemosse under järnåldern (Thesis) (in Swedish). Stockholm University.
- Nelson, Lance E. (2008). "Ecology". In Mittal, Sushil; Thursby, Gene (eds.). Studying Hinduism: Key Concepts and Methods. London: Routledge.
- Pevan, Erin Kristine (2019). With the wagon-guider, a word do I seek: Examining gender, myth, ceremony, and interment in the social history of wagons in the Viking Age (Thesis). Universitet i Oslo.
- Semple, Sarah (2010). "Chapter 2, In the Open Air". Signals of Belief in Early England: Anglo-Saxon Paganism Revisited. Oxbow Books. ISBN 978-1-84217-395-4. JSTOR j.ctt1cd0nf9.8.
- Simek, Rudolf (2008). A Dictionary of Northern Mythology. Translated by Hall, Angela. BOYE6. ISBN 9780859915137.
- Strang, Veronica (2004). The Meaning of Water. New York: Berg Publishers.
- Varner, Gary R. (2004). Water of Life Water of Death: The Folklore and Mythology of Sacred Waters. Baltimore: PublishAmerica.
- "Gundestrupkedlen, Gundestrup". Nationalmuseets Samlinger Online.
