= Matariki (disambiguation) =

Matariki is the name of the Pleiades star cluster in Māori culture in New Zealand, and also a public holiday of the same name.

Matariki may also refer to:

- Matariki (film), a 2010 New Zealand drama film
- Matariki Court, a specialist court based in Kaikohe, Northland Region
- Matariki Hospital, Te Awamutu, Waipa, New Zealand
- Matariki Network of Universities, an international network of universities
