= Mondry =

Mondry or Mundry is a surname. In Poland, these are non-standard or regional forms of Mądry. Notable people with the surname include:

- Chuck Mondry (born 1968), American screenwriter
- Henrietta Mondry, New Zealand academic
- Isabel Mundry (born 1963), German composer

== See also ==
- Eryka Mondry-Kost (born 1940), Polish gymnast
