= Mądry =

Mądry (Polish pronunciation: [ˈmɔndrɨ]; optional feminine: Mądra) is a Polish surname meaning "wise". Gender inflection is optional for the surname (unlike the adjective from which it derives); some women choose to use Mądry instead of Mądra. Mondry is a respelled or dialectal form, as is Mundry. The Czech, Slovak, and Ukrainian cognates are Moudrý, Múdry, and Mudry, respectively.

Notable people with this surname include:

- Ilona Mądra (born 1966), Polish basketball player
- Maria Ilnicka-Mądry (1946–2023), Polish politician
