= Naturpark Åmosen =

Nature park in Denmark

Coordinates: 55°35′N 11°32′E

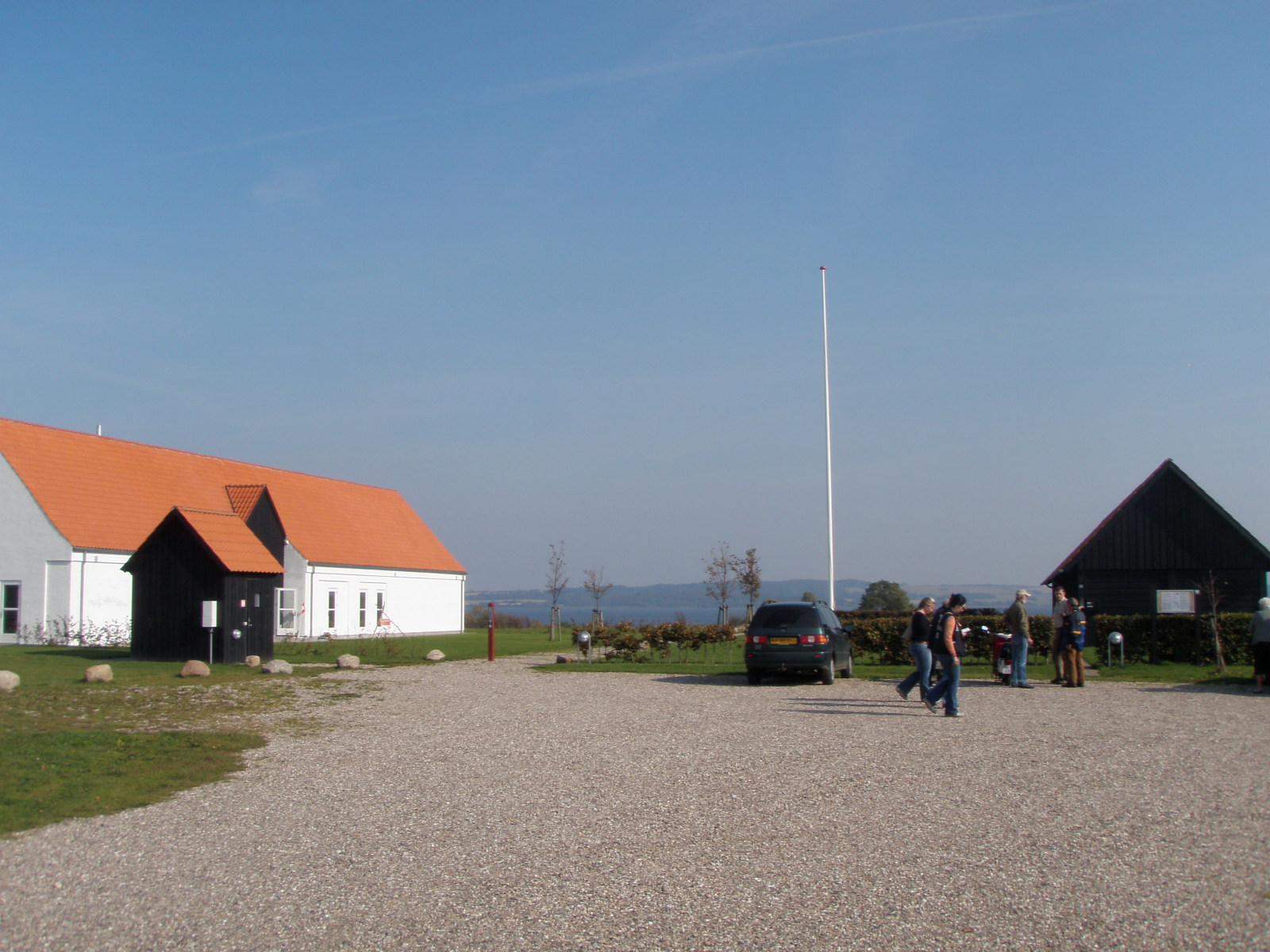
Fugledegård: The headquarters and communication centre of Naturpark Åmosen.

Naturpark Åmosen is a nature park on west Zealand in Denmark.

The nature park comprise c. 8,000 ha of connected wetlands emerging from the lowlying bog of Store Åmose in the east near the town of Hvalsø, through the lakes of Skarresø and Tissø and ending at the sea in the west, at the Great Belt. Most of the area is designated as Natura 2000 and according to the park service, it is believed to hold great natural beauty, landscapes representing typical Danish countrysides, a rich natural diversity and high cultural historic importance. These points have all been essential in establishing the park and it has been certified as a Nature Park by the Danish Outdoor Council and their authorized labeling schemes for Danish Nature Parks from 2013. An excerpt from the nature parks own website states:

"With the nature park, there should be a positive development within all areas: nature, culture, outdoor life, public outreach, business and settling."

Most of Naturpark Åmosen is on private hands, as most of the Danish countryside. Establishing the park is thus a freely cooperation between the State, the Municipality, local citizens and private landowners and the involvement of local citizens have been a major priority in the process. The current agency of the nature park is working on establishing a fund.

The farmhouse of Fugledegård on the western bank of lake Tissø, is the headquarters and communication center of Naturpark Åmosen. They host exhibitions, several events and guided tours throughout the year.

== Gallery ==
Nature

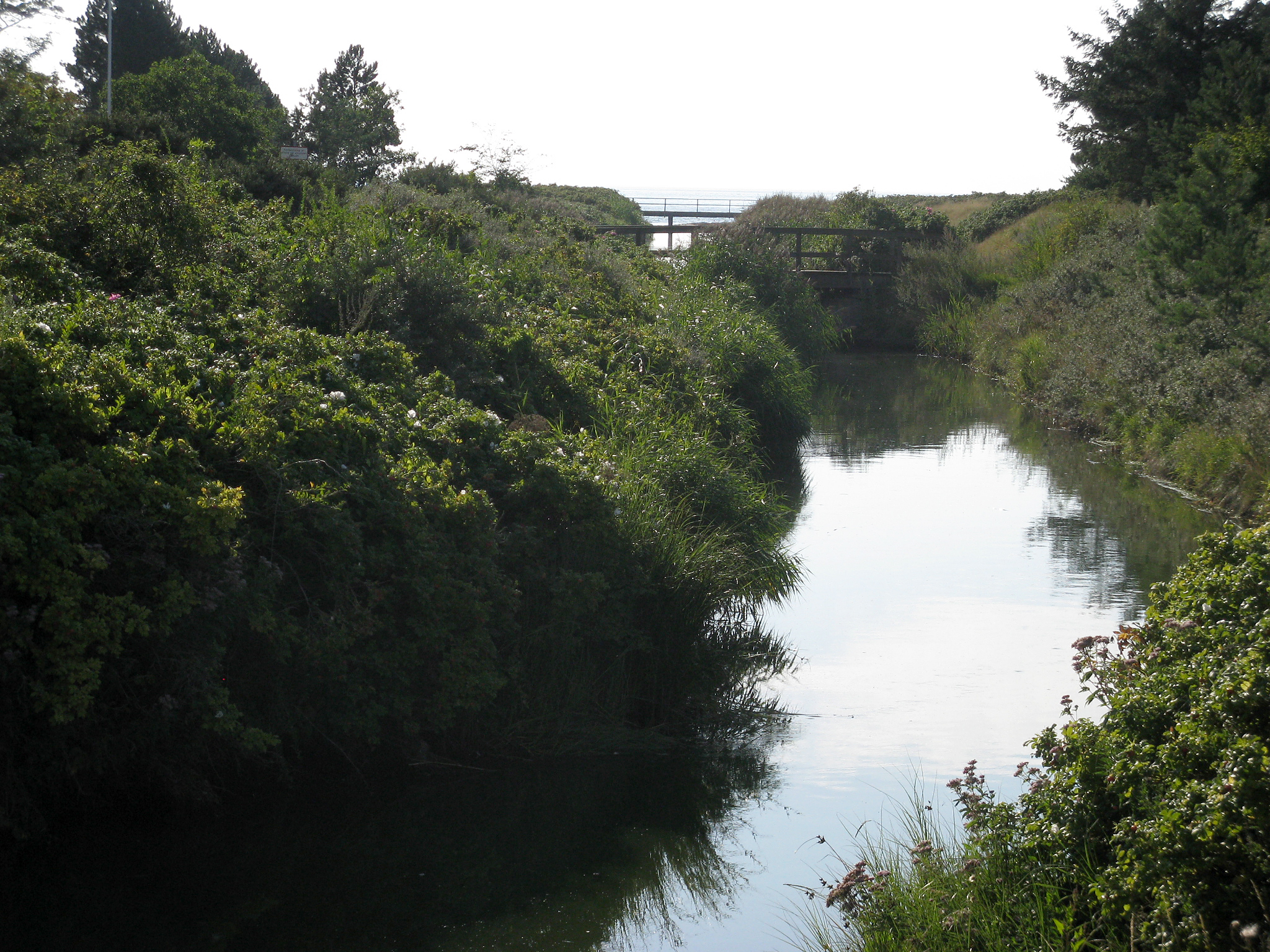
From 'Halleby Å', the stream connecting the wetland areas.

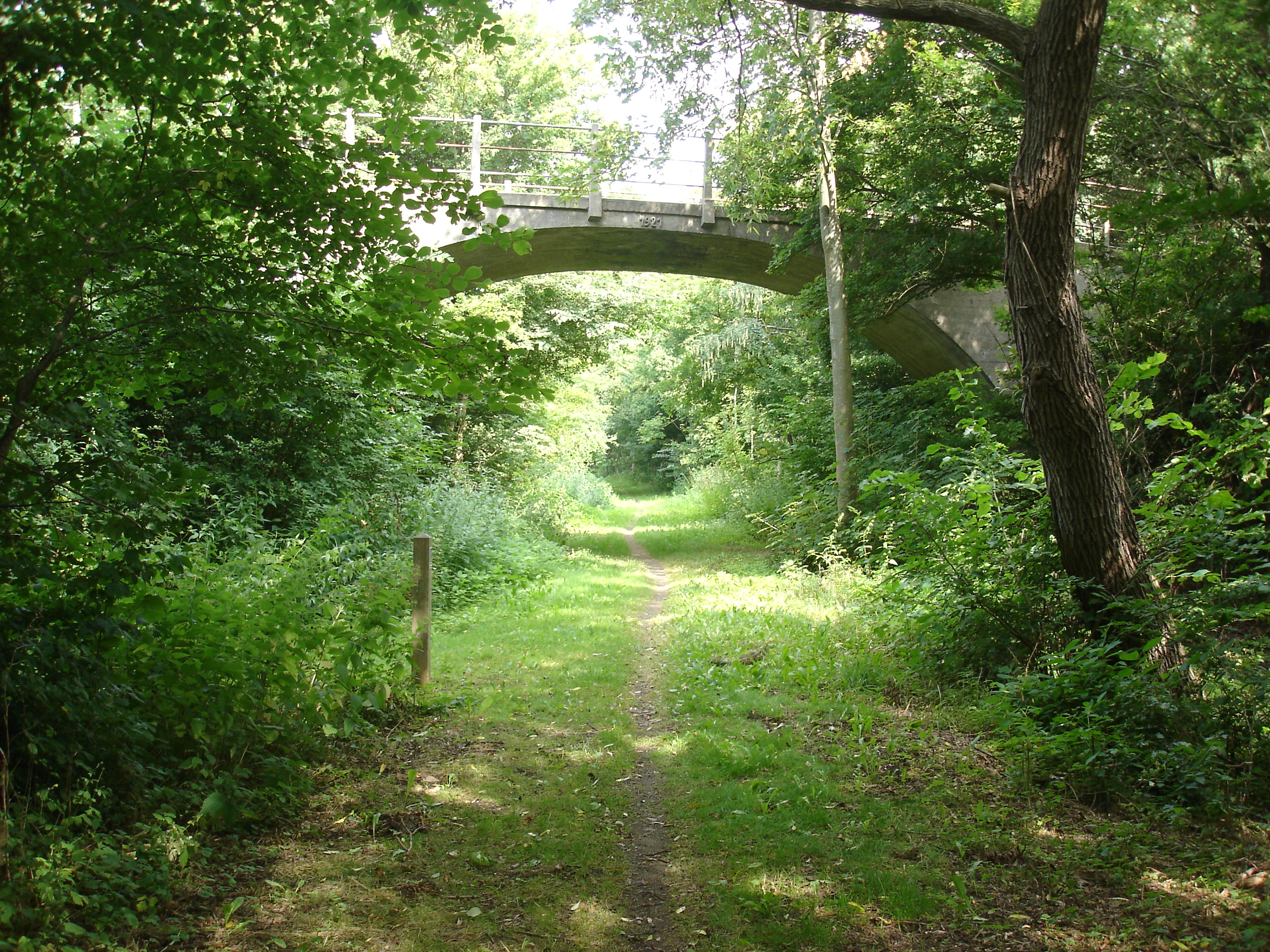
A naturepath on an abandoned railway track

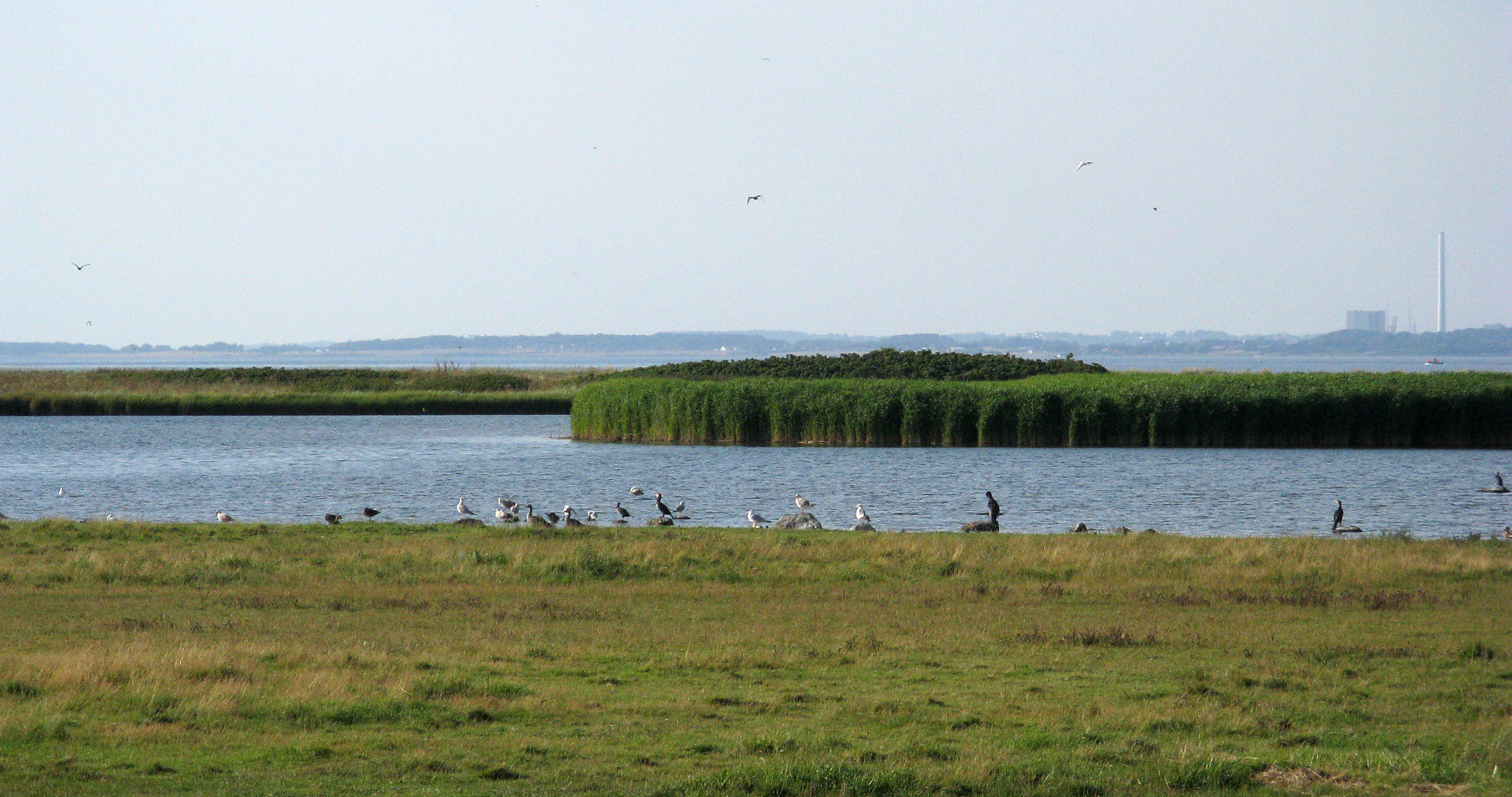
'Flasken', where the nature park meets the sea in the west.

Culture

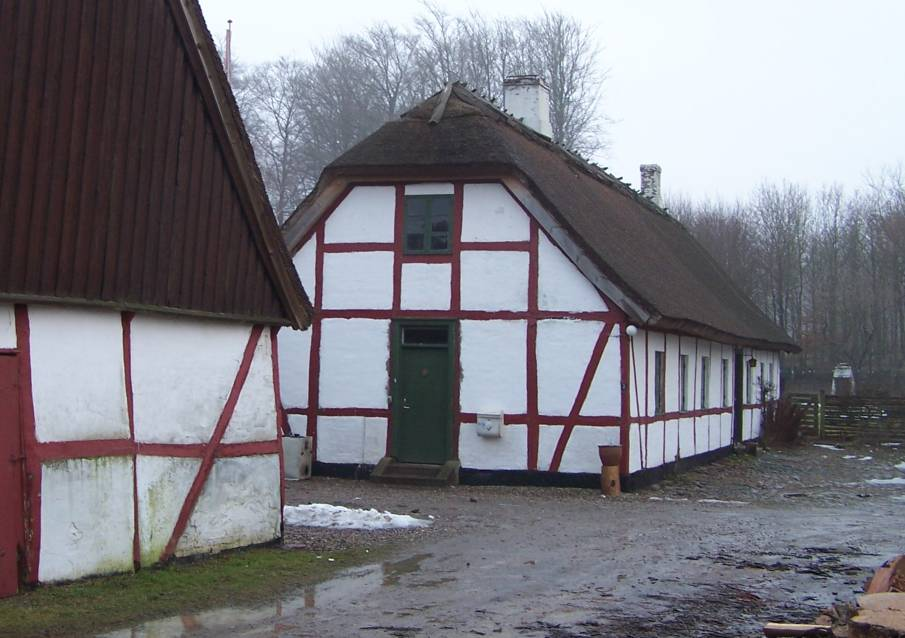
Farmhouses in the hamlet of Halleby Ore, between the lakes of Skarresø and Tissø.

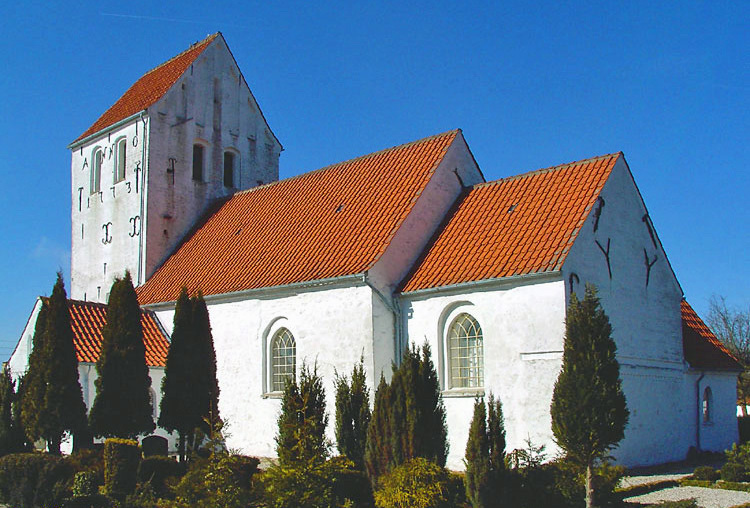
Hallenslev church

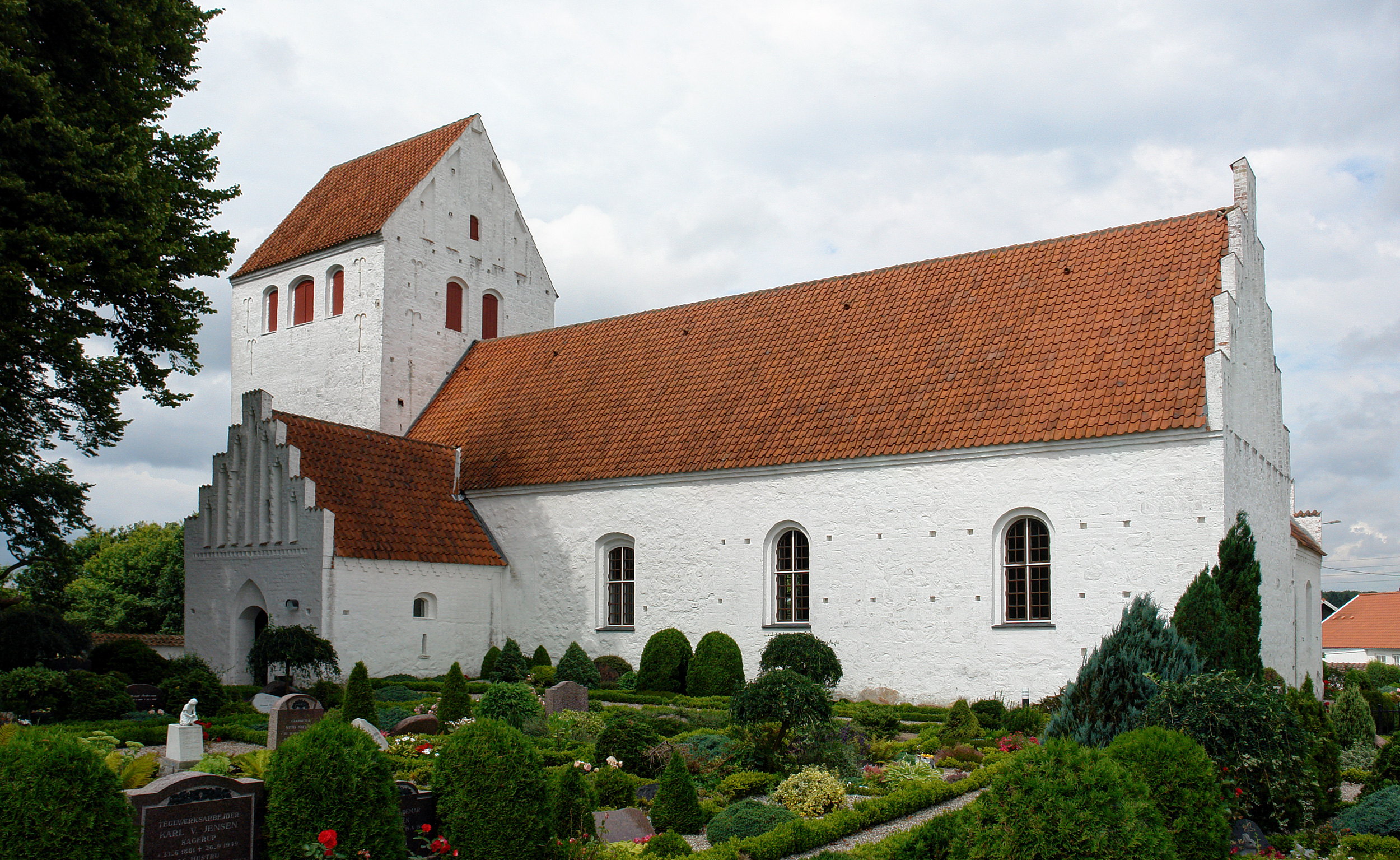
Undløse church

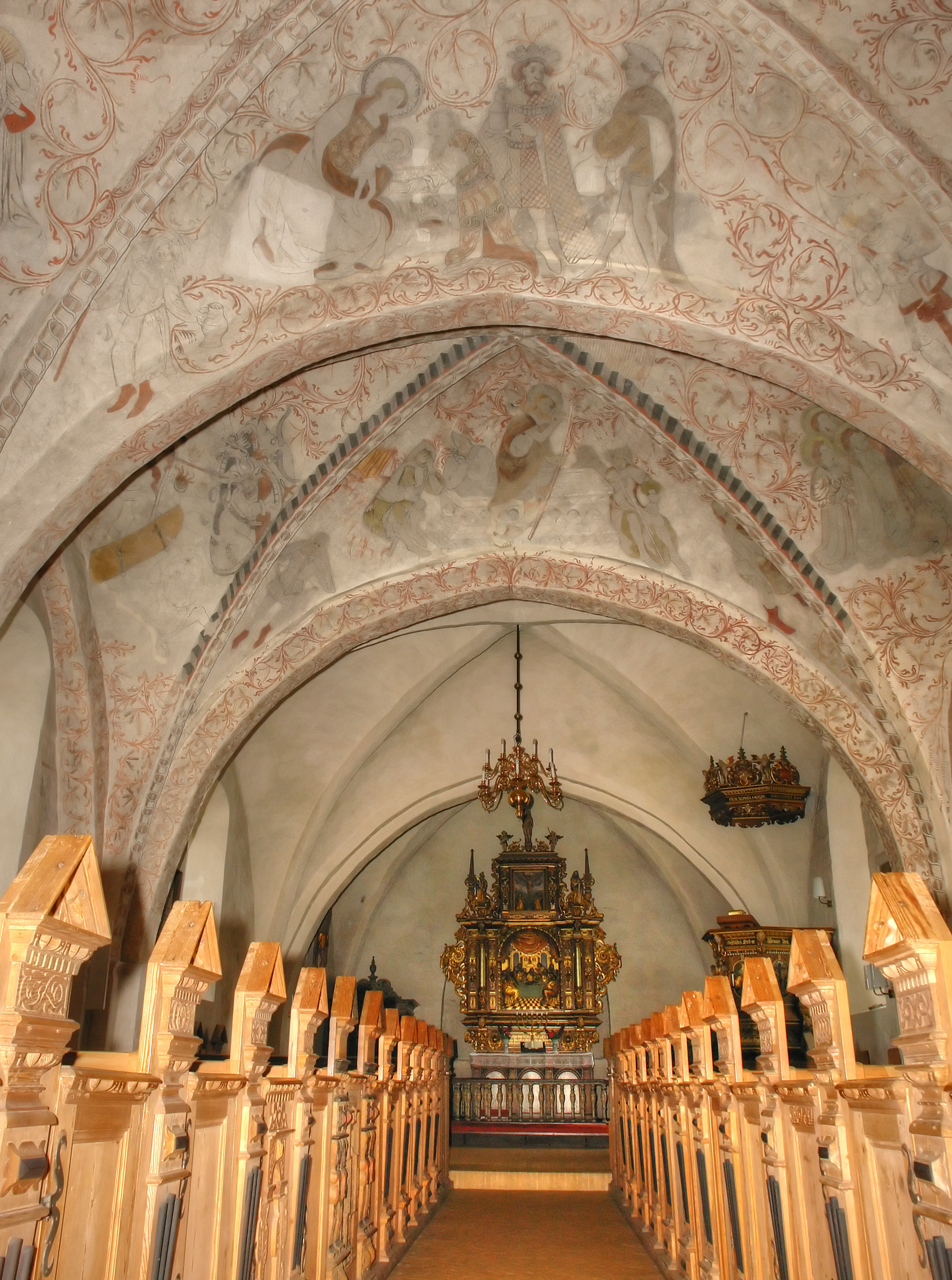
Some of the medieval frescoes in Undløse church

== Sources ==
- 156 Store Åmose, Skarresø og Bregninge Å Danish Nature Agency (in Danish)
- 157 Åmose, Tissø, Halleby Å og Flasken Danish Nature Agency (in Danish)
