= Tissø =

Lake in Kalundborg, Denmark

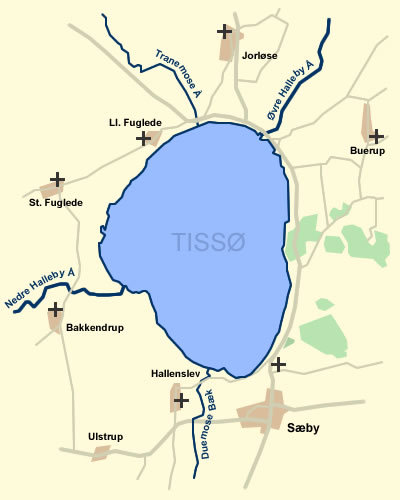
- A map of lake Tissø, the in- and outflows and the nearby towns

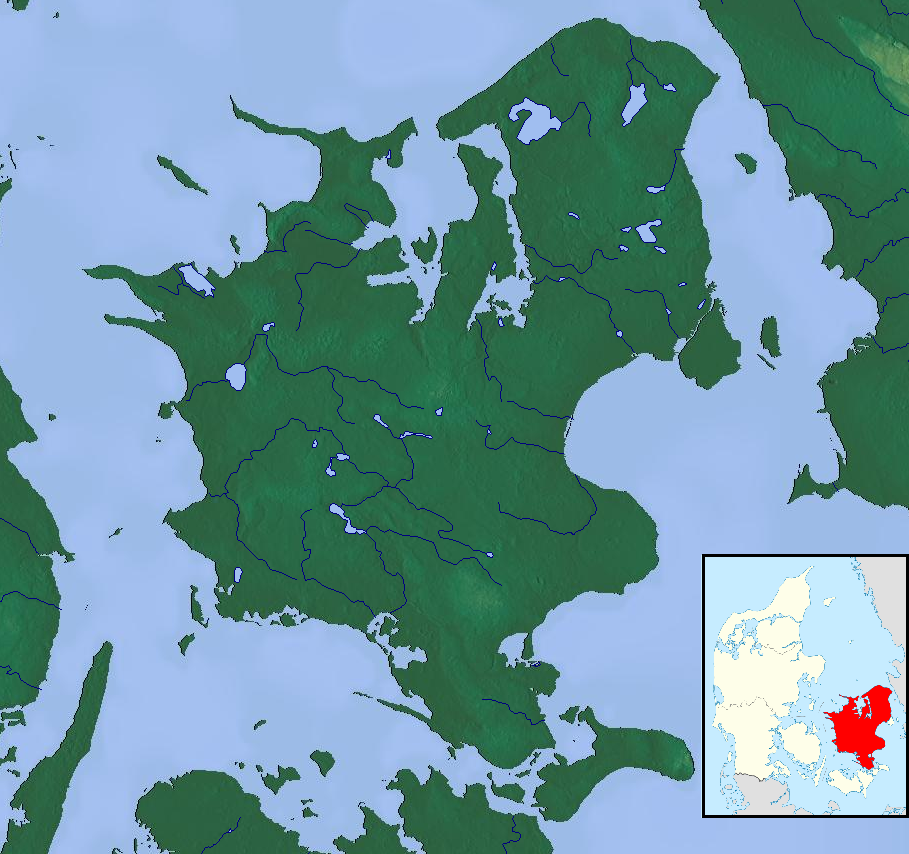
- Location within Zealand
- Location: Zealand, Kalundborg Municipality
- Coordinates: 55.57°N 11.3°E
- Type: Kettle hole
- Primary inflows: Øvre Halleby/Åmose Å, Duemose Bæk, Tranemose Å
- Primary outflows: Nedre Halleby/Åmose Å
- Catchment area: 417.89 km^{2} (161.35 sq mi)
- Surface area: 1,233 ha (3,050 acres)
- Average depth: 8.2 m (27 ft)
- Max. depth: 13.5 m (44 ft)
- Water volume: 100.64 million cubic metres (3.554×10^{9} cu ft)
- Surface elevation: 2 m (6.6 ft)
- Islands: 0
- Settlements: Sæby

Tissø is the fourth largest freshwater lake in Denmark, at 12.3 km^{2}. It is located on the western part of Zealand, in the municipality of Kalundborg.

There are several small towns and villages near the lake, of which Sæby is the biggest at 343 citizens (2013).

In the town of Kalundborg, some of Lake Tissø's outflow is used as cooling water for the Kalundborg Eco-industrial Park.

== Etymology ==
'Tissø' means 'The God's Lake', but the etymology and meaning is not obvious. Basically the name can be broken into Tis-sø, where sø means 'lake' in a literal and simple translation from Danish to English. Tis refers to the old god Tir, whose name is part of many places in Denmark (such as Tisvilde, Tirslund, or Thisted). Thus, Tissø was originally known as 'Tir's Lake'. However, the word Ti is also an Old Danish word meaning 'God', without being specific. For unknown reasons, it appears that at some point during the Iron Age, the new god Tor took over Tir's role as a god of war. This religious change implies that Lake Tissø's name means 'The God's Lake', relying on the meaning of the word ti, without being specific about which god, or gods for that matter.

In recent years, a slightly different understanding of the origins of the name 'Tissø' has emerged. It is possible that the name originally was Tis-ø and that the extra s was added later on, when name-recording was needed. The pronunciation of Tissø and Tis-ø is almost the same, but the later translates as 'Tir's Island', possibly referring to the area around Fugledegård on the western shore of the lake. Fugledegård was once a settlement and a magnates residence in the Viking Age, situated on a relatively high lying area, that used to be an islet. Remains of a cult-house have been excavated and there are numerous remains of animal sacrifices and religious practises at Fugledegård. There is no doubt that the area was an important religious site in former ages and it is possible that it gave name to the entire lake.

There are many myths and legends about the origin of lake Tissø.

== History ==
The lake of Tissø was created after the ice receded at the end of the last ice age. Parts of the ice cover were left behind and landlocked in valleys of the virgin lands. Such ice pockets are known as dead ice. As the climate steadily warmed up, they melted and turned into freshwater lakes known as kettle holes.

Tissø has always had a great importance for the people living nearby. In the earliest of times, humans hunted around the lake in the summer months; there are numerous traces of their activities in the area and the wetlands now surrounding the lake. Of special mention are Maglemosen to the southwest of the lake and Åmosen to the east, where defining archaeological finds of the so-called Maglemosian culture and Kongemose culture were discovered in 1900 and 1952, respectively.

As the climate warmed and people begun to build permanent settlements, the lake also became important as a place for the deposition of votive offerings. There have been many finds from the Iron Age and Viking Age as well as the cult practices continued even after the Christianization of Denmark.

=== Kalmargården ===
There are several excavations of Iron Age settlements around Tissø.

In 1976, a large golden ornamental ring manufactured in the 10th century was unearthed during a regular field-plowing. The Tissø Ring is a neck-ring with a diameter of 30 cm, and at 1.83 kg (originally 2 kg), it is one of the largest gold finds in Denmark. This led to professional investigations. Remains of a Viking estate was discovered at the site now known as 'Kalmargården', near Fugledegård on the western lakebrink. In 1995–2003 large-scale excavations revealed that the total settlement covered about 500,000 m^{2} (50 ha), centered around a 12 m × 48 m hall, with several buildings and structures believed to have ritualistic purposes. In 2012 remains of another large hall measuring 8 m × 35 m was discovered. The magnate's residence of Kalmargården greatly resembles the residences excavated at 'Old Lejre' in central Zealand and at Järrestad in Scania. It has been suggested that Kalmargården served as a seasonal residence for the royal family based in Old Lejre.

Some of the historic evidence is on exhibit at Kalundborg Museum in Kalundborg and others are on exhibit at the National Museum of Denmark in Copenhagen. The Fugledegård visitor centre is near the Viking magnate's former residence.

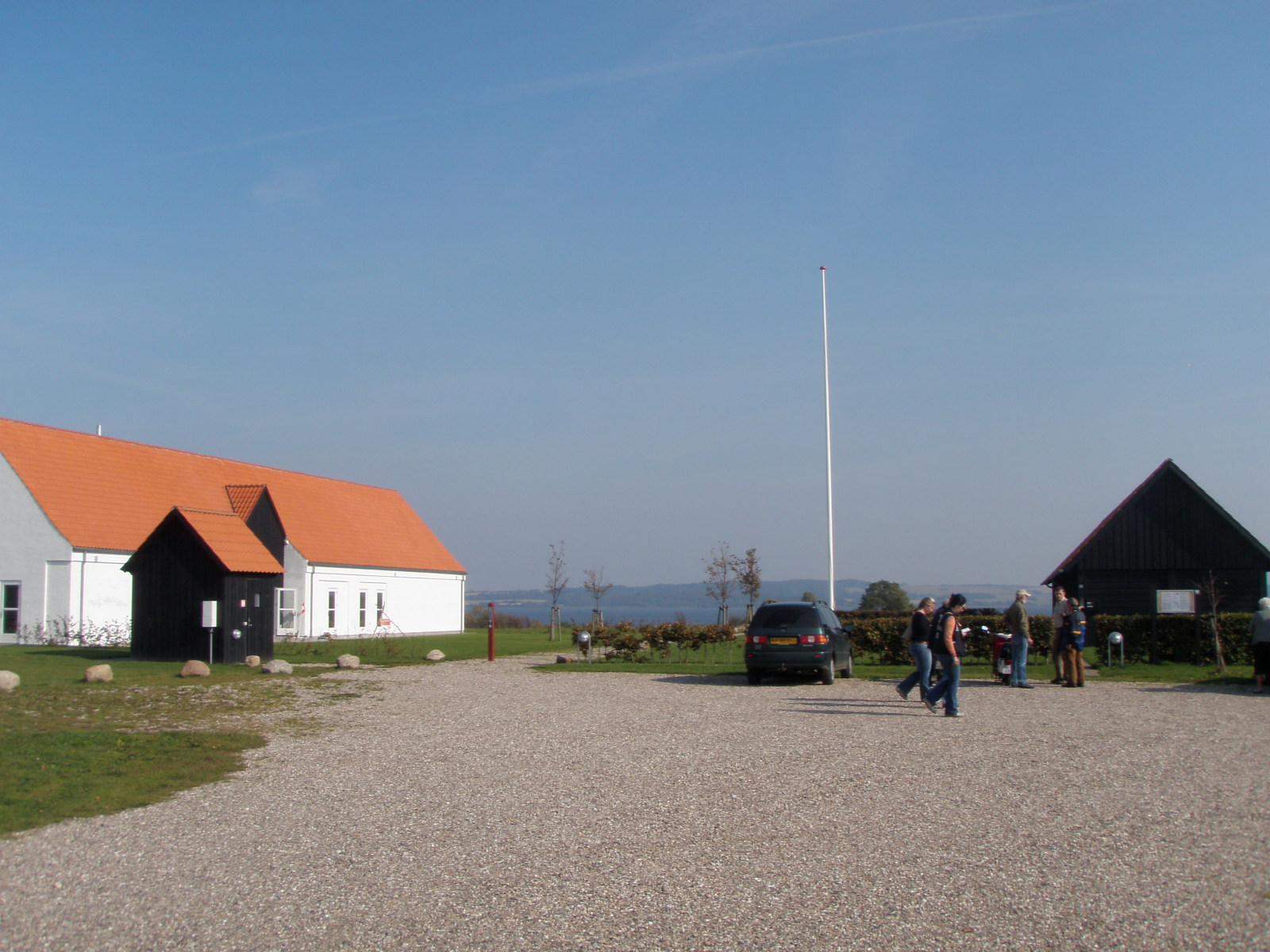
Fugledegård visitor centre on the western lakebrinks

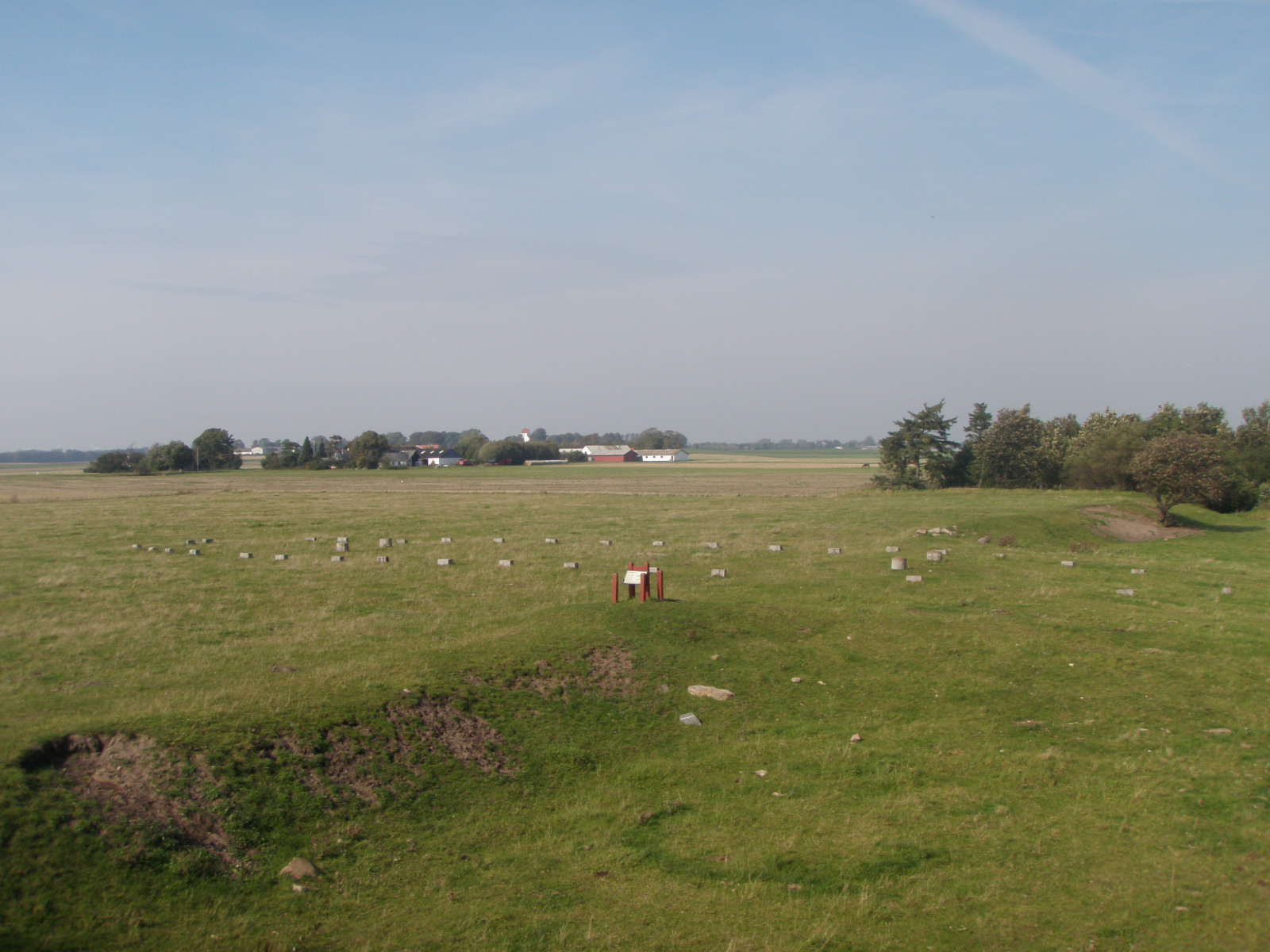
Part of the Kalmargård excavations at Fugledegård

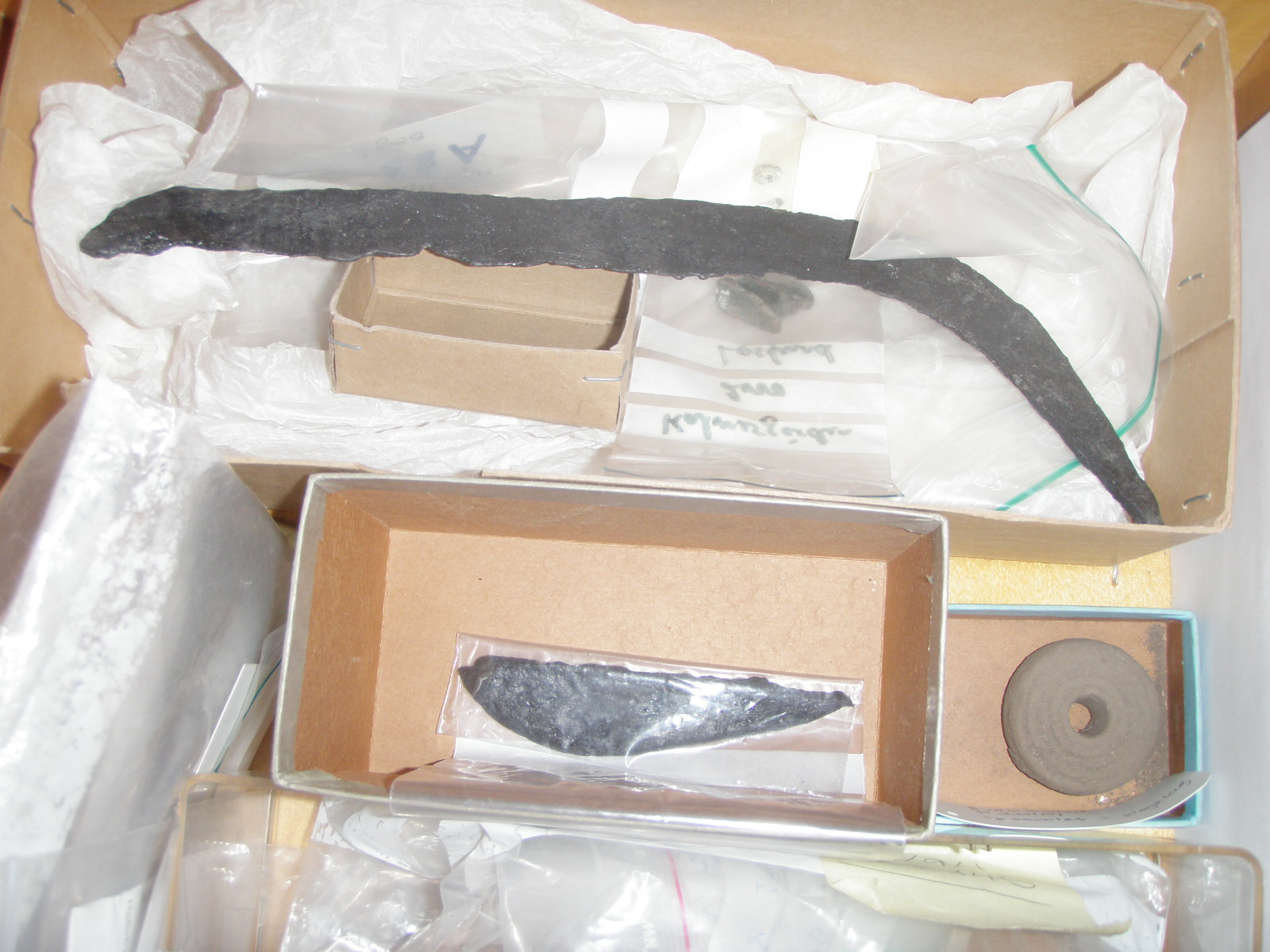
Some excavated artifacts from Kalmargård

== Nature ==
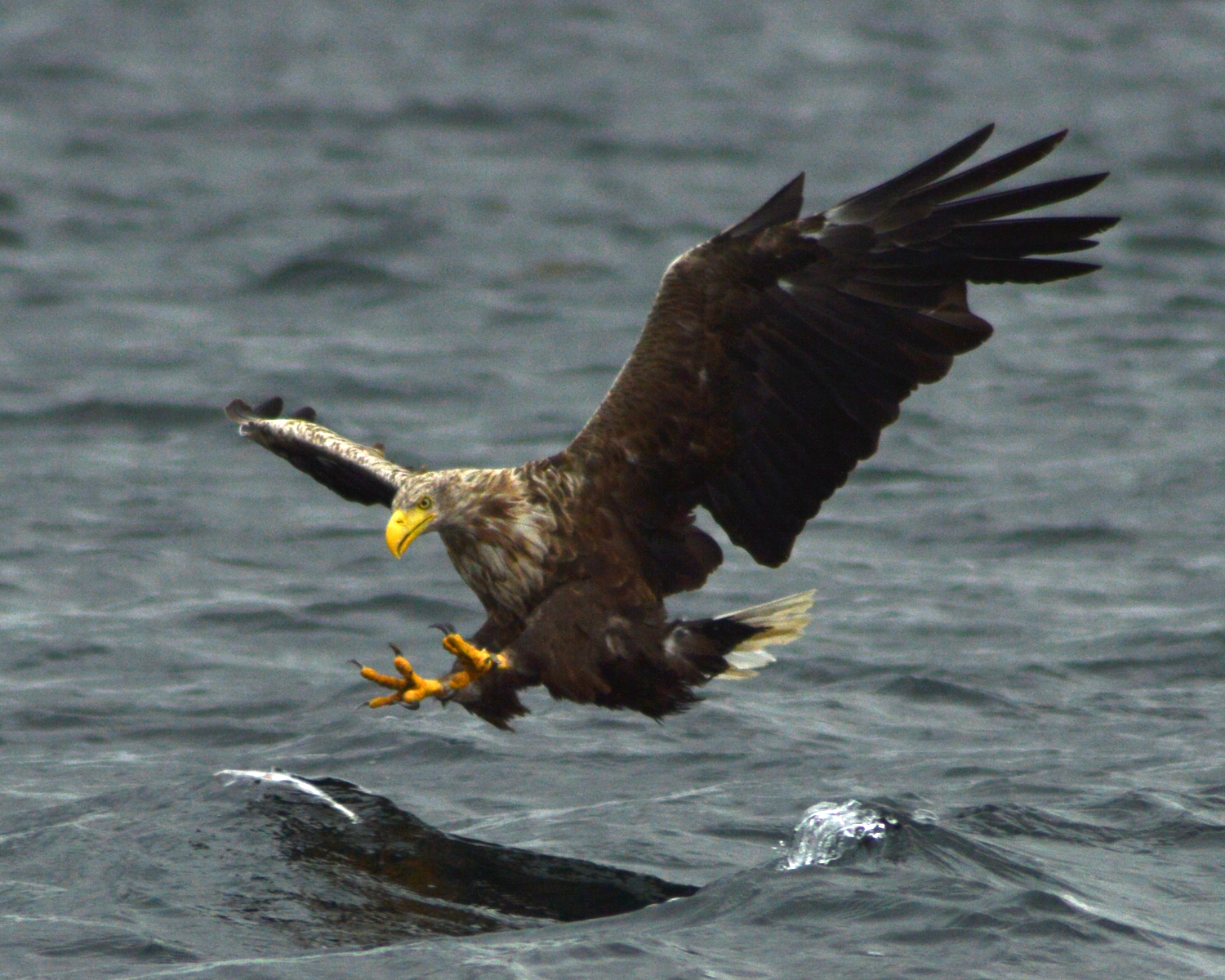
The white-tailed eagle living at lake Tissø are rare in Denmark. The species became extinct in the country in 1917, but returned in 1995 and the population is growing. The birds are occasionally found breeding at the lake.

Even though Tissø is steadily polluted by excess nutrients from the surrounding farmlands and inflows, the environmental standard of the lake is usually considered good, because of the high rate of water exchange and an effective natural oxygenation of surface waters. Therefore, the lake supports rich fish and plant life, with around 20 species of fish. Most of the fish spend their entire life in the lake, but a few, like the ide and the brown trout, migrate from the sea through the stream of Nedre Halleby Å. Surprisingly, the lake also houses European flounder. The flounder can live, but not spawn, in the fresh waters of the lake. According to the angling association 'Lystfiskeriforeningen Anno 1886', the lake is dominated by European perch, but a good-sized population of northern pike is here as well. Other common fish includes tench, various carps, and European eel. There is a small and fragile population of zander.

Tissø formerly supported commercial fishing, but is now exclusively fished by anglers only. Fishing is strongly regulated nowadays, requiring a fishing licence and is restricted to daylight hours more than 100 m from the shores. Two larger areas of the western part of the lake are also to be protected from both fishing and sailing, and rules apply to what size and kind of fish can be caught.

=== Birds ===
Tissø is home to a rich and varied birdlife. Occasionally, hunting white-tailed eagles or ospreys can be seen – a rare sight in Denmark. On the lake itself can be found great crested grebe, common merganser, various dabbling and diving ducks, greylag goose, bean goose, Canada goose, mute swan, whooper swan, tundra swan, and Eurasian coot. The beach meadows and reed beds house many foraging and breeding birds like pied avocet, little tern, common reed bunting, Eurasian reed warbler, and western marsh harrier, in addition to Eurasian bittern, bearded reedling, Eurasian penduline tit, and common grasshopper warbler. Almost all of the lakeside is privately owned, but there is a publicly accessible birdwatching tower near Fugledegård. Both the lake and the associated reed beds are of international importance to migratory birds, so hunting and ordinary traffic is strongly regulated in the eastern section.

=== Plants ===
On the southeastern shores near the village of Sæby is a protected strip of land consisting of dry commons on steep slopes, where human traffic is prohibited from 1 April to 15 July. The protection safeguards a special plant life here, breeding birds, and the general view of the lake. North of this strip is a small deciduous forest known as Klinteskoven, with public access to the lake shores.

The steep slopes at Tissø's northern end are also to be protected. Here sun-loving plants like small pasque flower, sunrose, and dwarf everlast are found, with the rare and threatened fragrant scabious in between. The meadows below the cliffs are also of botanical interest, being a biotope of calcium-rich springs that supports plants like marsh lousewort, bog-star, and various true sedges like blue sedge, along with orchids like early marsh orchid, western marsh orchid, and marsh helleborine.

=== The nature park ===
The lake of Tissø is part of Naturpark Åmosen; an approximately 8,000 ha nature park consisting primarily of Natura 2000 designations. Tissø itself belongs to Natura 2000 area 157 specifically.

== See also ==
- Heathen hofs

== Sources and literature ==
- Gotfredsen, Anne Birgitte & Thomsen, L.G. (2011). Three pit houses at the magnate’s residence at Lake Tissø. In: Boye, L. (ed.) The Iron Age on Zealand. Status and Perspectives. Nordiske Fortidsminder, Series C, volume 8. København, pp. 211–220.
- Jørgensen, Anne Nørgård, Lars Jørgensen & Lone Gebauer Thomsen (2011): Assembly Sites for Cult, Markets, Jurisdiction and Social Relations. Historic-ethnological analogy between North Scandinavian church towns, Old Norse assembly sites and pit house sites of the late Iron Age and Viking Period. Archäologie in Scleswig Sachsensymposium Haderslev 2010, pp. 95–112.
- Bican, Josefine Franck, Anna Severine Bech and Susanne Klingenberg (2011): Pre-Christian Cult Sites – archaeological inverstigations. I: Hans Christian Gulløv, Peter Andreas Toft & Caroline Polke Hansgaard (red): Challenges and solutions. Northern Worlds – Report from workshop 2 at the National Museum, 1 November 2011, pp. 261–268.
- Bican, Josefine Franck (2010): Bulbrogård, the first aristocratic complex at Tissø - and a new approach to the aristocratic sites. I: Gedächtnis-Kolloquium Werner Haarnagel (1907–1984). Herrenhöfe und die Hierarchie der macht im Raum südlich und ¨stlich der Nordsee von der vorrömischen Eisenzeit bis zum frühen Mittelalter und zur Wikingerzeit. 11.-13. oktober 2007, Burg Bederkesa in Bad Bederkesa. Niedesächsisches Institut für historische Küstenforschung (Hrsg.). Siedlungs- und Küstenforschung im südlichen Nordseegebiet 33, pp. 147–154, Rahden.
- Thomsen, Lone Gebauer (2009): Pit Houses on Zealand in the Late Iron Age and the Viking period – a survey based on the material from the excavation at Tissø. I: Glaube, Kult und Herrschaft. Phänomene des Religiösen im 1. Jahrtausend n. Chr. in Mittel- und Nordeuropa. Hrsg.: Uta von Freeden, Herwig Friesinger, Egon Wamers. Kolloquien zur Vor- und Frühgeschichte Band 12, Frankfurt. Römisch-Germanische Kommission des Deutsche Arch. Instituts. Bonn, pp. 501–510.
- Jørgensen, Lars (2008): Manor, cult and market at Lake Tissø. I Stefan Brink & Niel Price (eds.), The Viking World, Routledge/Oxon, pp. 77–82.
- Jørgensen, Lars (2006): Tracking down the aristocracy. Distribution patterns and coin use at the Viking manor and market at Lake Tissø, Denmark. I: H.W. Horsnæs & J.C. Moesgaard (eds.): 6th Nordic Numismatic Symposium. Single Finds: the Nordic Perspective. Nordic Numismatic Journal 2000–2002, Copenhagen, pp. 190–207.
- Jørgensen, Lars (2003): Manor and Market at Lake Tissø in the Sixth to Eleventh Centuries: The Danish "Productive" Sites. I: Pestell, Tim & Katharina Ulmschneider (red): Markets in Earley Medieval Europa. Trading and “Productive” Sites, 650–850. Macclesfield. pp. 175–207.
- Jørgensen, Lars (2001): From tribute to the estate system, 3rd-12th century. A proposal for the economic development of the magnates’ residences in Scandinavia based on settlement structure from Gudme, Tissø and Lejre. I: Arrhenius, B. (red): Kingdoms and Regionality. Transactions from 49th Sachsensymposium 1998 in Uppsala. Theses and papers in Archaeology B:6. Stockholm, pp. 73–82.
- Pedersen, Anne (2001): A Striding Mapn from Tissø – a rare imitation of Charlemagne’s Dorestad-coinage Nordisk Numismatisk Årsskrift 1994–96, pp. 22–40.
- Jørgensen, Lars og Pedersen, Lisbeth (1996): Vikinger ved Tissø. Gamle og nye fund fra et handels- og håndværkscenter. (pp. 22–36) Nationalmuseets Arbejdsmark. København. (in Danish)
