= Bryan R. Cullen =

- Born: Bryan Richard Cullen; December 1951 (age 74–75); Bradford, West Riding of Yorkshire, England
- Education: Rutgers University
- Scientific career
- Fields: Molecular Genetics; Microbiology
- Workplaces: Duke University

Bryan Richard Cullen is a James B. Duke Professor of Molecular Genetics and Microbiology at Duke University Medical Center in Durham, North Carolina. Cullen was the Founding Director of the Duke University Center for Virology.

== Early life and education ==
Cullen was born in December 1951 in Bradford, England, where he graduated head of his class from Thornton Grammar School in 1970. In 1973, he received a B.Sc. in biochemistry from Warwick University, England and in 1974, he received an M.Sc. in virology from Birmingham University, England. Dr. Cullen emigrated to the US in 1974, where he received a Ph.D. in microbiology from Rutgers University, New Jersey, in 1984. He became a US citizen in 1992.

== Research ==
Cullen and his laboratory are currently studying the regulation of viral mRNA expression by epitranscriptomic modifications and the use of CRISPR/Cas as a potential approach to the treatment of chronic diseases caused by DNA viruses.

Cullen discovered the phenomenon of “transcriptional interference” in retroviruses and showed that this explained why proviral 5’LTRs are active while 3’ LTRs are silenced. After starting his own research group in 1984, he demonstrated that the HIV-1 Tat protein activates viral transcription and that the HIV-1 Rev protein induces viral RNA nuclear export. He demonstrated that HIV-1 readily infects non-dividing cells, an unexpected result that overturned then prevalent dogma, and showed that a single variable loop in the Envelope protein, the V3 loop, controls HIV-1 tissue tropism.

His laboratory was the first to express and functionally characterize microRNAs in mammalian cells and the first to identify and functionally characterize the microRNAs encoded by the herpesviruses KHSV, EBV and HSV-1.

Recently, his laboratory was the first to report that several distinct epitranscriptomic modifications added to viral mRNAs promote viral gene expression and replication.

== Controversy ==
On May 24, 2022, Cullen replied-all to a department-wide email about an inclusivity module by claiming that it is a "left-wing Maoist political propaganda workshop" and that he will refuse to engage in it "as a tenured faculty". He was widely criticized in the same email chain, where he was also perceived to be transphobic.

== Awards and honors ==
Cullen was the recipient of the 1989 Ely Lilly Molecular Biology Award. He was awarded a distinguished fellowship by Durham University, UK in 2007. He is a Fellow of the American Academy of Microbiology since 2009 and of the American Association for the Advancement of Science since 2011. He was named one of the top peer reviewers by the Journal of Virology in 2009 and 2011 and has been identified as a highly cited scientist by both Clarivate Analytics at Web of Science and by Thomson Reuters annually since 2001. He was awarded an honorary doctorate of science (D.Sc.) degree by Warwick University in 2016.

== Key publications ==
- Cullen, Bryan R., Lomedico, Peter T. and Ju, Grace. (1984) Transcriptional Interference in Avian Retroviruses-Implications for the Promoter Insertion Model of Leukaemogenesis. Nature 307, 241–245.
- Cullen, Bryan R. (1986) Trans-activation of Human Immunodeficiency Virus Occurs Via a Bimodal Mechanism. Cell 46, 973–982.
- Malim, Michael H., Hauber, Joachim, Le, Shu-Yun, Maizel, Jacob V. and Cullen, Bryan R. (1989) The HIV-1 Rev Trans-activator Acts Through a Structured Target Sequence to Activate Nuclear Export of Unspliced Viral mRNA. Nature 338, 254–257.
- Malim, Michael H., Böhnlein, Sabine, Hauber, Joachim and Cullen, Bryan R. (1989) Functional Dissection of the HIV-1 Rev Trans-activator – Derivation of a Trans-dominant Repressor of Rev Function. Cell 58, 205–214.
- Malim, Michael H., Tiley, Laurence S., McCarn, David F., Rusche, James R., Hauber, Joachim and Cullen, Bryan R. (1990) HIV-1 Structural Gene Expression Requires Binding of the Rev Trans-activator to its RNA Target Sequence. Cell 60, 675–683.
- Hwang, Stephen S., Boyle, Terence J., Lyerly, H. Kim and Cullen, Bryan. R. (1991) Identification of the Envelope V3 Loop as the Primary Determinant of Cell Tropism in HIV-1. Science 253, 71–74.
- Weinberg, J. Brice, Matthews, Thomas J., Cullen, Bryan R. and Malim, Michael H. (1991) Productive HIV-1Ba-L Infection of Nonproliferating Human Monocytes. The Journal of Experimental Medicine 174, 1477–1482.
- Courtney, David G., Kennedy, Edward M., Dumm, Rebekah E., Bogerd, Hal P., Tsai, Kevin, Heaton, Nicholas S. and Cullen, Bryan R. (2017) Epitranscriptomic enhancement of influenza A virus gene expression and replication. Cell Host & Microbe, 22: 377–386.e5.

== Editorship ==
Dr. Cullen has served as an Associate Editor for Cell, and PLoS Pathogens. He has also served as an editorial board member for several major journals.
