= Rachael Wiseman =

Contemporary analytic philosopher

Rachael Wiseman is a British analytic philosopher. She has expounded the work of Elizabeth Anscombe and Ludwig Wittgenstein. In 2022, she was short-listed for the National Book Critics Circle Award for Biography, and won the 2022 HWA Non-Fiction Crown Award.

== Life ==
She lectures at University of Liverpool.

One of the co-founders of the Women in Parenthesis project.

Along with co-author Claire McCumhaill, she has argued that homo sapiens are "metaphysical animals", consciously extending the classic Aristotelian definition of "rational animal" to rebut the materialist anti-metaphysical bias of most 20th century philosophy.

She has correlated the absence of sound ethics and metaphysics in modern thought to the absence of women in philosophy, and has supported the hypothesis of Mary Midgely that both phenomena derive from the fact that most European philosophers have been bachelors.

She has argued for rejecting Sydney Shoemaker's reading of an influential passage from Wittgenstein's Blue Book as "Immunity to Error through Misidentification", holding that the passage reflects neither solipsism nor a purely detached stoicism, but rather "an expression of deep concern for the world, for living things, and for oneself as one object among many". She believes that Saul Kripke made a similar misreading in his rule-following considerations, in that both "mistake the interlocutors voice for Wittgenstein's own, and both generate a line of inquiry that is radically misdirected".

== Selected publications ==
- Wiseman, Rachael (2015-01-01). "Anscombe's Intention". Jurisprudence. 6 (1): 182–193. doi:10.5235/20403313.6.l.182 (inactive 12 July 2025). ISSN 2040-3313.
- Wiseman, Rachael (2016). "The Intended and Unintended Consequences of Intention" (PDF). American Catholic Philosophical Quarterly. 90 (2): 207–227. doi:10.5840/acpq201622982. "On 1st May 1956, Oxford University's Convocation ...considered nominations for honorary degrees ... One of the nominations was Harry S. Truman ... Anscombe ..."caused a small stir" ... by arguing that the nomination should be rejected on the grounds that Truman was guilty of mass murder ... Anscombe's speech did not persuade ...The House was asked to indicate its attitude toward the nomination, and showed overwhelming support. ... On 20th June, Truman was awarded his honorary degree"
- Mac Cumhaill, Clare; Wiseman, Rachael (2022). Metaphysical animals : how four women brought philosophy back to life. London. ISBN 978-0-385-54570-9. OCLC 1289274891.
- Great Thinkers: Jane Heal FBA on Elizabeth Anscombe FBA British Academy blog podcast with Rachael Wiseman (13 May 2019)
- Wiseman, Rachael (December 2019). "The Misidentification of Immunity to Error through Misidentification". The Journal of Philosophy. CXVI (12): 663–677. doi:10.5840/jphil20191161242. S2CID 213512230.
