= Henrietta Mondry =

New Zealand professor of Russian culture

- Education: University of Witwatersrand
- Awards: FRSNZ, FNZAH
- Scientific career
- Fields: Russian cultural history
- Workplaces: University of Witwatersrand; University of Canterbury
- Thesis: The Evaluation Of Recent Trends In Soviet Dostoevsky Scholarship (1970s–1980s) (1984)

Henrietta Mondry is a New Zealand academic, and is a full professor at the University of Canterbury, specialising in Russian cultural history, especially in relation to the history of Jewish people in Russia. Mondry was elected a Fellow of the Royal Society Te Apārangi as of 2009.

== Academic career ==
After an MA, Mondry earned a PhD titled The Evaluation Of Recent Trends In Soviet Dostoevsky Scholarship (1970s–1980s) at the University of Witwatersrand. Mondry taught at Witwatersrand from 1980, and was made Head of Russian Studies in 1987 and then associate professor in Russian. She was appointed to the University of Canterbury in 1994. She is a full professor at the University of Canterbury, where she coordinates the Russian programme.

Mondry has written more than ten books, over seventy scholarly articles and over forty book chapters. She was involved in developing two international journals, the New Zealand Slavonic Journal and the South African-published Slavic Almanac.

== Selected works ==
- Henrietta Mondry (January 2021), Embodied Differences: The Jew's Body and Materiality in Russian Literature and Culture, Boston: Academic Studies Press, OL 22198835W, Wikidata Q108112243
- Henrietta Mondry (11 February 2015), Political Animals: Representing Dogs in Modern Russian Culture, OL 25692228W, Wikidata Q101252578
- Henrietta Mondry (2011). "The Jewish Persona in the European Imagination: A Case of Russian Literature". Slavic Review. 70 (3): 713–714. doi:10.5612/slavicreview.70.3.0713. ISSN 0037-6779. Wikidata Q101492432.
- Henrietta Mondry (1 November 2009). Exemplary Bodies: Constructing the Jew in Russian Culture, 1880s to 2008. Academic Studies Press. doi:10.2307/j.ctt21h4wgs. ISBN 978-1-61811-852-3. JSTOR 10.2307/j.ctt21h4wgs. OL 31367519M. Wikidata Q60189588.
- Henrietta Mondry (1 January 2006), Pure, Strong and Sexless: the Russian Women’s Body and Gleb Uspensky, OL 4353484W, Wikidata Q108112338
- Henrietta Mondry (December 2002). "Is the end of censorship in the former Soviet Union a good thing? The case of Vasily Rozanov". East European Jewish Affairs. 32 (2): 114–120. doi:10.1080/13501670208577980. ISSN 1350-1674. Wikidata Q58524264.
- Henrietta Mondry (June 1999). "A note on the invocation of Russian classics in the present‐day nationalist and philosemitic Russian press". East European Jewish Affairs. 29 (1–2): 129–139. doi:10.1080/13501679908577896. ISSN 1350-1674. Wikidata Q58501172.

== Awards and honours ==
Mondry was elected a Fellow of the Royal Society Te Apārangi in 2009. She was also elected a Fellow of the New Zealand Academy of Humanities (now the Humanities Society of New Zealand) the same year.
