= Veronica Strang =

Author and professor of social anthropology

Academic background
- Education: Oxford University (PhD, 1995)

Academic work
- Discipline: Anthropology
- Sub-discipline: Cultural anthropology; Environmental studies
- Institutions: Auckland University of Technology; Durham University; Oxford University; Pitt Rivers Museum; University of Auckland; University of Wales, Lampeter

Veronica Strang is an author and professor of anthropology affiliated with Oxford University. Her work combines cultural anthropology with environmental studies and focuses on the relationship between human communities and their environments. Strang's publications include Uncommon Ground (1997), The Meaning of Water (2004), Gardening the World (2009), What Anthropologists Do (2009, 2021), Water (2015), and Water Beings (2023).

== Background ==
Veronica Strang was born in Durham, England. The family moved to Northamptonshire in the early 1960s, and Strang left the UK in 1979 to work as a graphic designer and freelance writer in the Caribbean, Canada and then Australia, where she spent a year working on a stock team in Far North Queensland. On returning to the UK in 1988, Strang began studying anthropology. She completed her PhD at Oxford in 1995, which led to the publication of Uncommon Ground (1997). Between 1994 and 1997, Strang taught at the Department of Anthropology and the Pitt Rivers Museum, while also conducting research at Oxford's Environmental Change Institute. She helped to establish a new anthropology department at the University of Wales, Lampeter.

In 2000, Strang received a Royal Anthropological Institute Fellowship in Urgent Anthropology. She moved to New Zealand shortly after this to take up professorial posts at Auckland University of Technology, and the University of Auckland and this enabled further research on water issues in New Zealand and Australia.

Strang returned to the UK in 2012, serving as the executive director of Durham University's Institute of Advanced Study. She served as the chair of the Association of Social Anthropologists of the UK and the Commonwealth from 2012 to 2017. She is now based in Oxford and affiliated with the university's School of Anthropology and Museum Ethnography.

== Scholarship ==
Much of Strang's work focuses on people's beliefs and values in relation to water, and how these drive sustainable or unsustainable practices. Her publication, The Meaning of Water, has analysed this subject, and she has since worked on multiple projects that examine how different groups, including indigenous communities, engage with water.

Being founded in cultural anthropology, Strang's work maintains a close interest in how material culture and the materiality of water overlap. As the director of a research institute, she has also written extensively about interdisciplinarity itself, and she continues to encourage collaborative research as an advisor to a number of institutes and funding councils internationally, including the NICHE Institute at Ca' Foscari University and the CIRCUS Institute at the University of Uppsala.

Strang has done work on water issues with UNESCO and with the United Nations, most recently working with the UN's High Level Panel on Water providing input about cultural and spiritual issues in relation to water. She has also assisted indigenous communities in Australia, and the Maori Council, with land and water claims.

== Recognition ==
- Royal Anthropological Institute Fellowship in Urgent Anthropology, 2000
- International Water Prize, UNESCO, 2007
- HEFCE's national Interdisciplinary Advisory Panel Fellowship, 2017
- Chair of the Association of Social Anthropologists of the UK, 2013–2017
- Election as Fellow of the Academy of Social Sciences, 2019.

== Selected publications ==
=== Authored books ===
- Strang, Veronica (1997). Uncommon Ground: Cultural Landscapes and Environmental Values. New York University Press.
- Strang, Veronica (2004). The Meaning of Water. Berg/Bloomsbury.
- Strang, Veronica (2009). Gardening the World: Agency, Identity, and the Ownership of Water. Berghahn.
- Strang, Veronica (2015). Water: Nature and Culture. Reaktion Books/University of Chicago Press.
- Strang, Veronica (2021) [2009]. What Anthropologists Do. Berg/Bloomsbury.
- Strang, Veronica (2023). Water Beings: From Nature Worship to the Environmental Crisis. Reaktion Press.

=== Edited volumes ===
- Strang, Veronica; Busse, Mark, eds. (2011). Ownership and Appropriation. Berg.
- Johnston, B.; Hiwasaki, L.; Klaver, I.; Ramos-Castillo, A.; Strang, Ceronica, eds. (2012). Water, Cultural Diversity and Global Environmental Change: Emerging Trends, Sustainable Futures?. Springer and UNESCO.
- Fardon, VeronicaRichard; Harris, Olivia; Marchand, Trevor H. J.; Nuttall, Mark; Shore, Cris; Strang, Veronica; Wilson, Richard A., eds. (2012). The SAGE Handbook of Social Anthropology. Vol. 1–2. SAGE Publications.
- Strang, Veronica; Edensor, T.; Puckering, J., eds. (2018). From the Lighthouse: Interdisciplinary Reflections on Light. Routledge.
- Strang, V. and Krause, F. (eds) 2026. Water, Scale and Materiality: anthropological perspectives on hydrosocial relations, Oxford, New York: Berghahn.

=== Edited journals ===
- Krause, F.; Strang, Veronica, eds. (2013). "Living Water: the powers and politics of a vital substance (Special Issue)". Worldviews: Global Religions, Culture and Ecology. 17 (2).
- Krause, F.; Strang, Veronica, eds. (2016). "Thinking Relationships Through Water (Special Issue)". Society and Natural Resources. 29 (6).
