= Matariki Network of Universities =

The Matariki Network of Universities (MNU) is an international group of universities that focuses on strong links between research and undergraduate teaching. Each member is leading international best practice in research and education based on long academic traditions. The MNU was established in 2010 to enable universities to enhance diversity, to share ideas and expertise, and to learn international best practice from each other, recognising the shared commitment to an ethos of excellence in research, scholarship and rounded education.

== Name and activities ==
Matariki is the name in the Māori language for the Pleiades star cluster, also known as the Seven Sisters. It reflects the seven founding member universities of the MNU.

The Matariki Undergraduate Research Network (MURN) ran in 2012 and 2013 as an attempt to foster international undergraduate research. Assessment of MURN found that it had worked well locally but the international element had been less effective, in particular due to differences in time zones and in academic calendars.

The academic libraries of the member institutions have collaborated on benchmarking activities to set their performance in an international context and to develop and share best practices. The libraries also collaborated on assessing whether 'flipped subscription' models for open access publishing, where funds previously used for journal subscriptions are flipped to instead pay article publishing costs, were viable for mid-sized research universities.

The "Oceans and the Blue Economy" theme brought together researchers from the Matariki universities to identify ways in which the marine economy could achieve economic goals while also building environmental resilience.

== Universities ==
The network was set up by seven universities in 2010. These were joined by an eighth university, University of the Western Cape in South Africa, in 2024. Two founder members, Dartmouth College and the University of Western Australia, left the network in 2025.

Members	Country	Year established	Year joined
Durham University	United Kingdom	1832	2010
Queen's University	Canada	1841	2010
University of Otago	New Zealand	1869	2010
University of Tübingen	Germany	1477	2010
University of the Western Cape	South Africa	1959	2024
Uppsala University	Sweden	1477	2010

Universities of the MNU
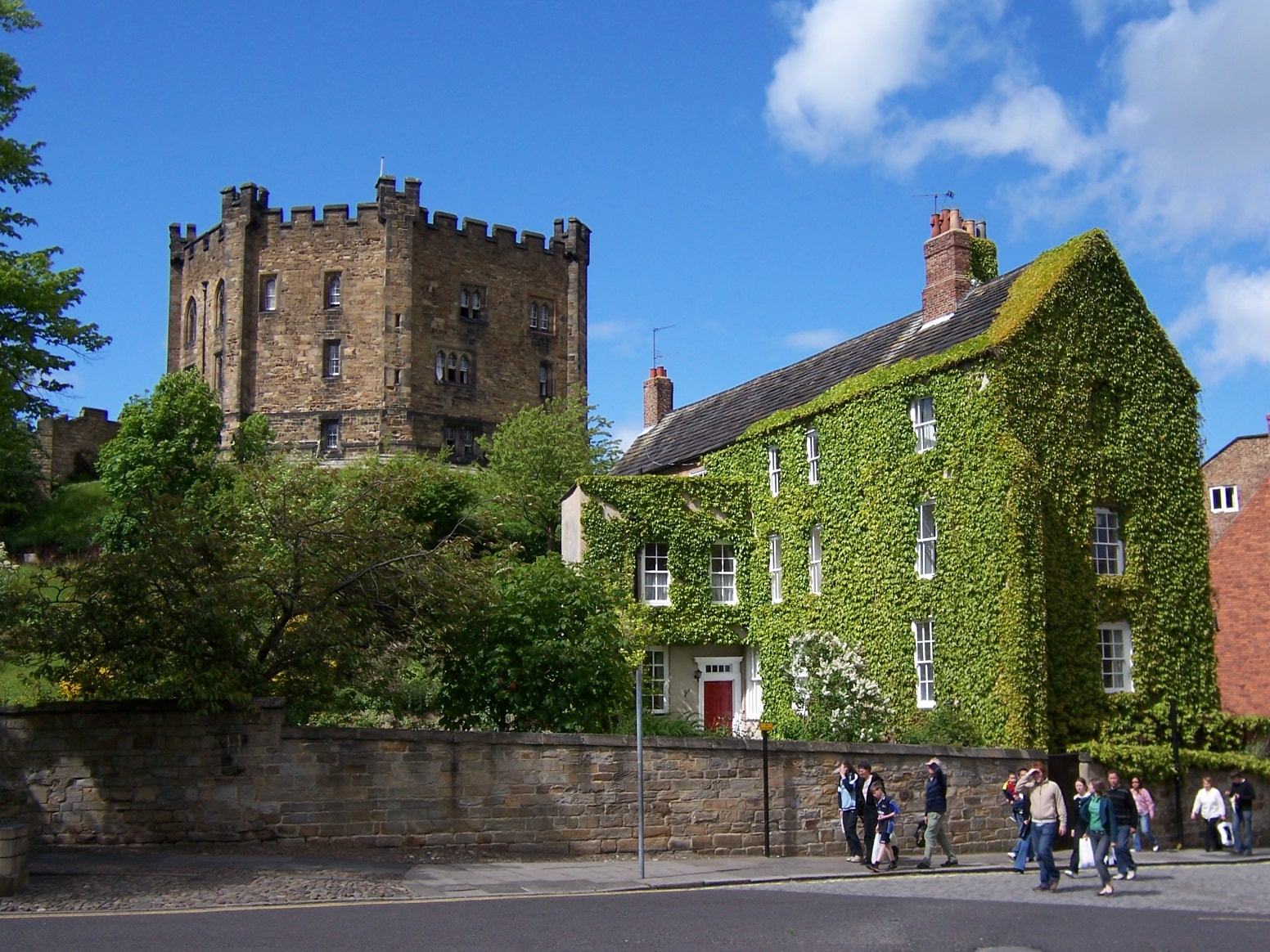
Durham University: University College

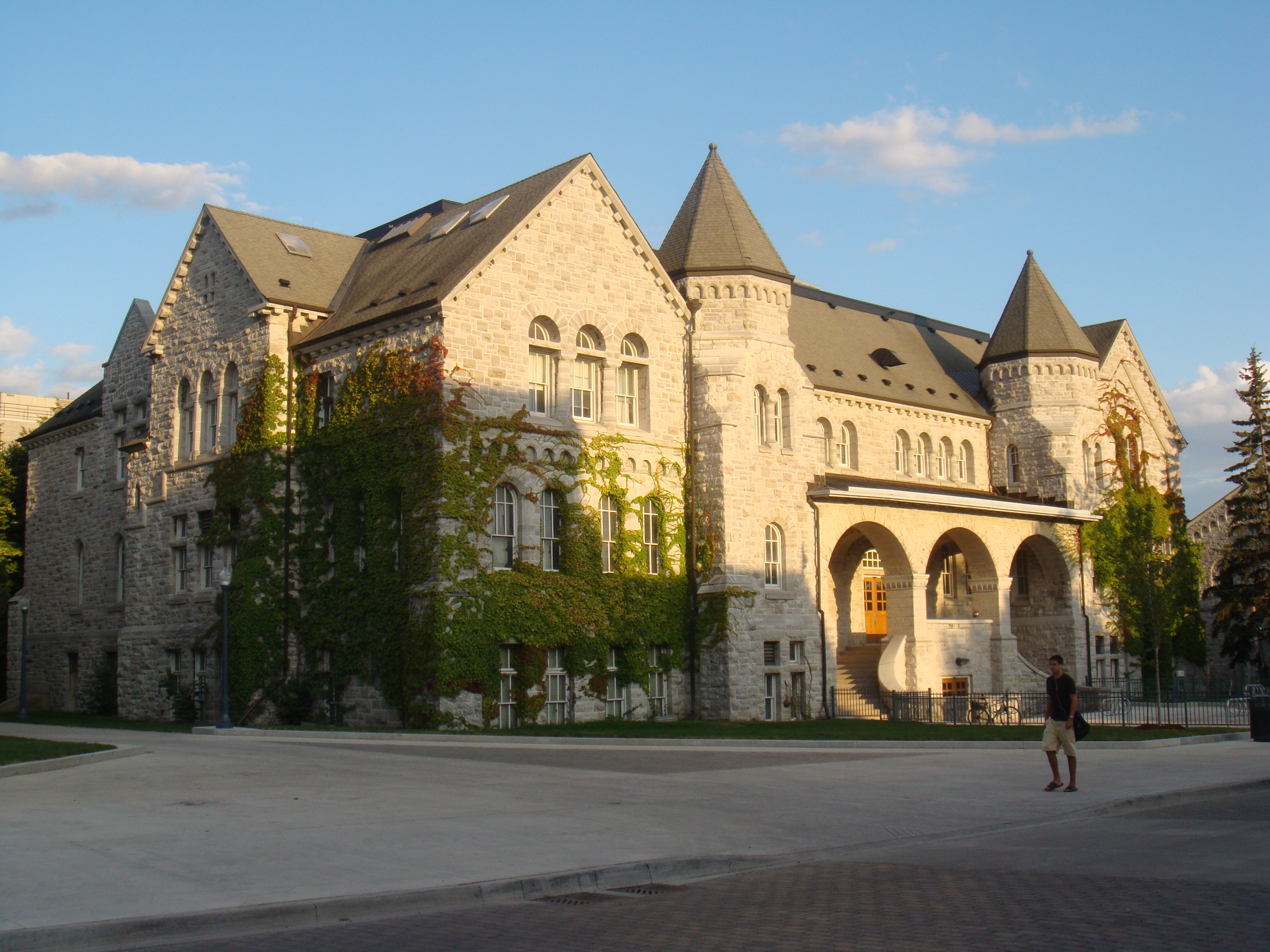
Queen's University: Ontario Hall

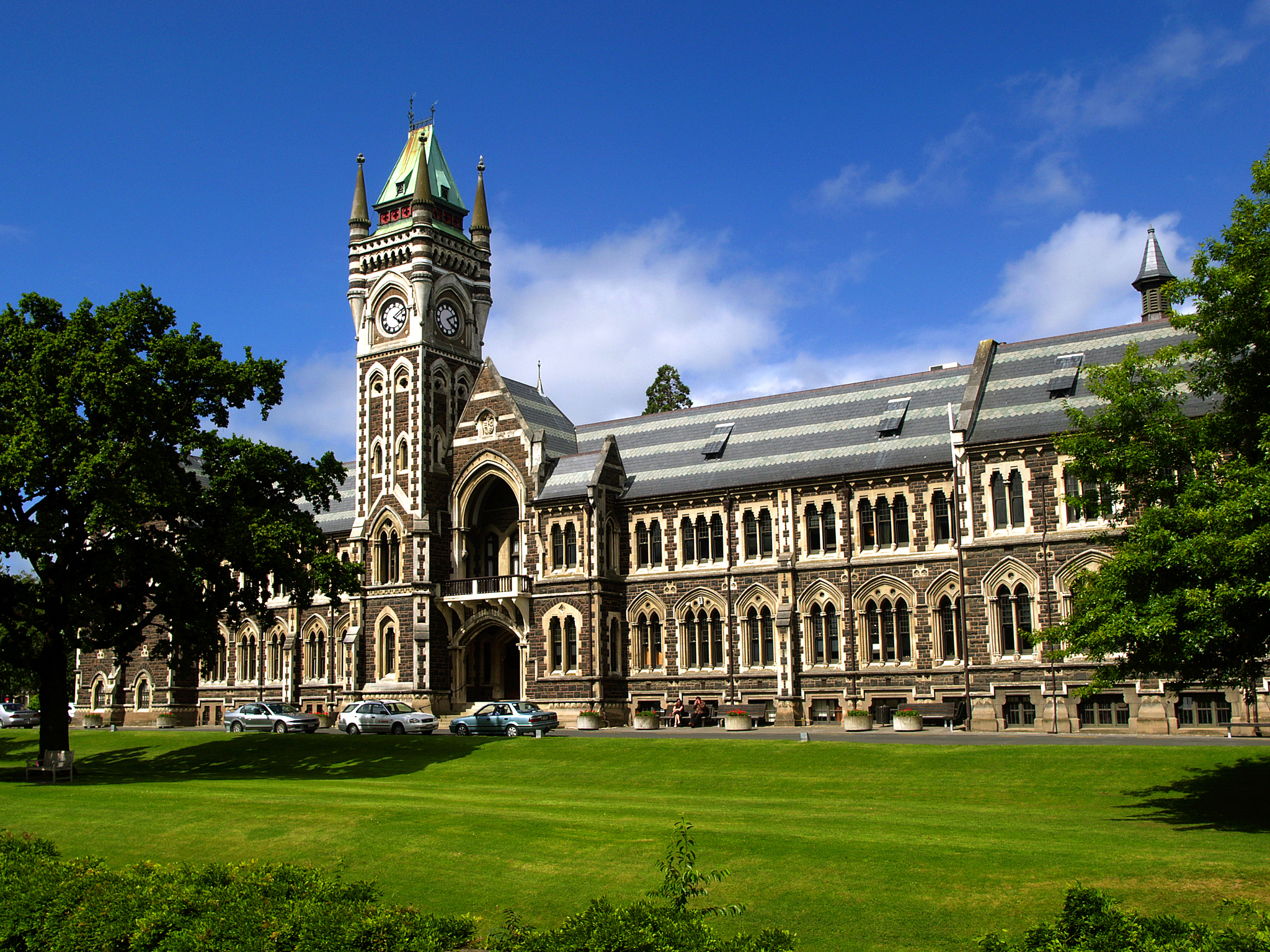
University of Otago: Clocktower Building

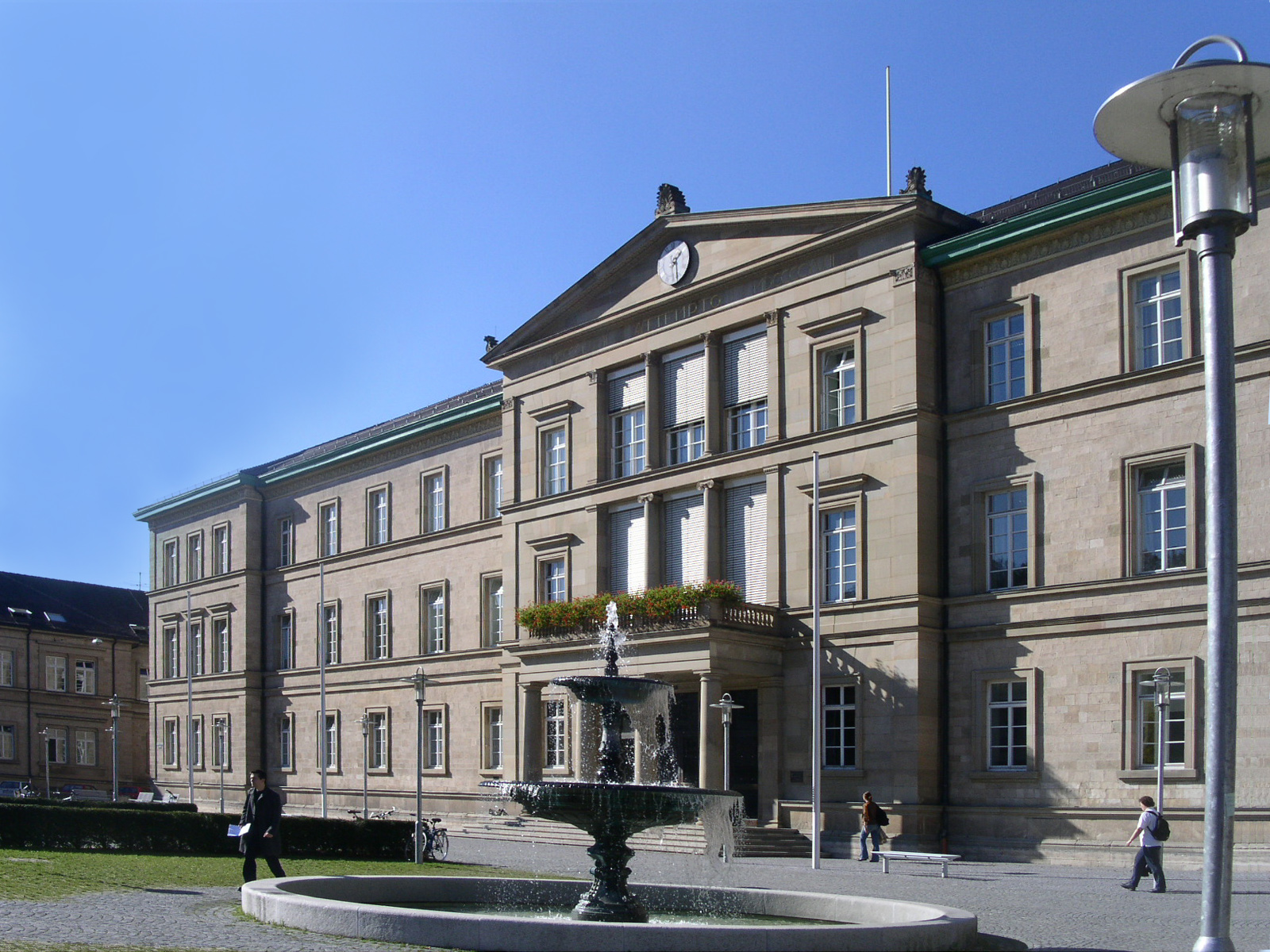
University of Tübingen: the Neue Aula

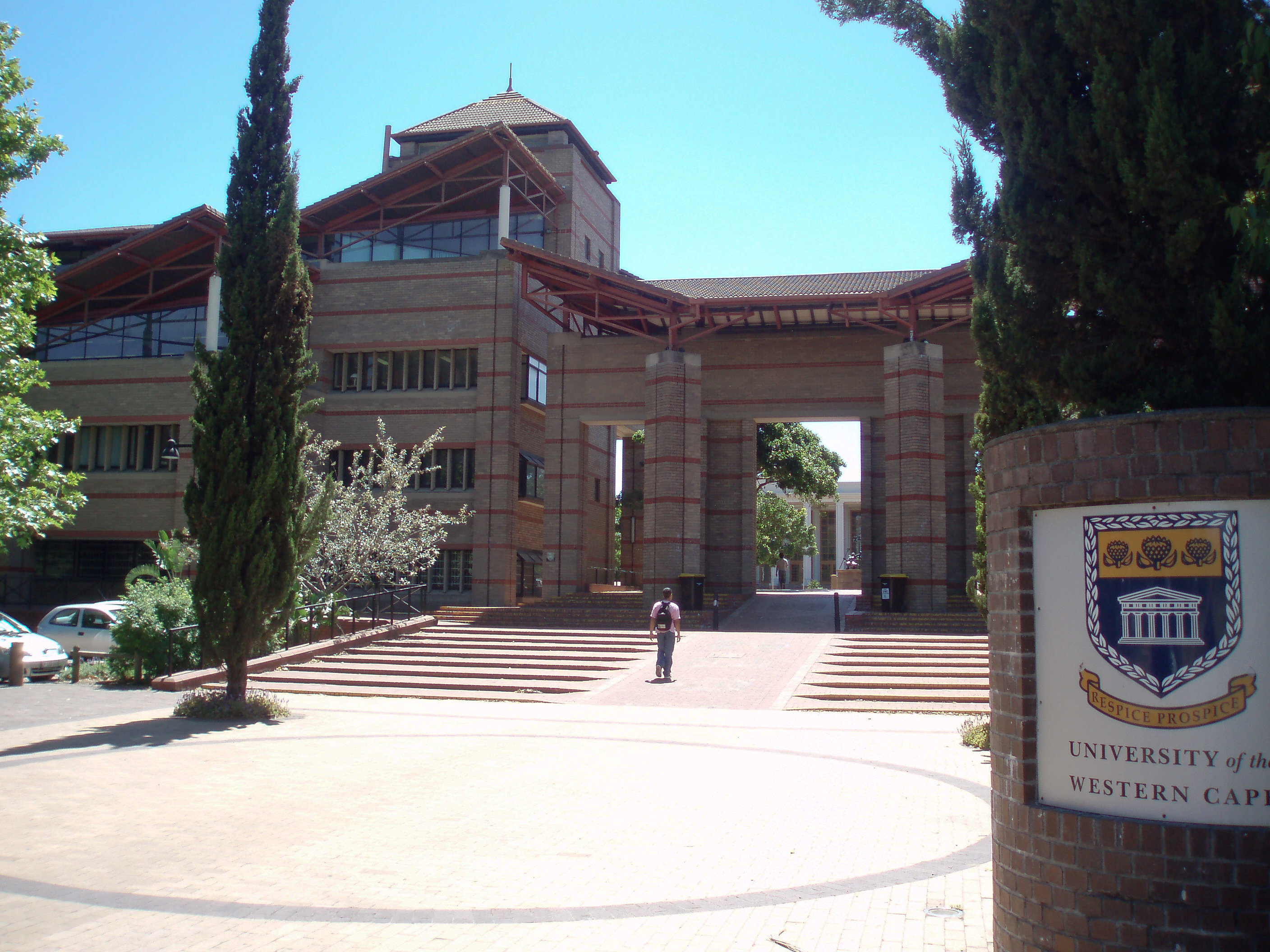
University of the Western Cape: entrance to the central campus

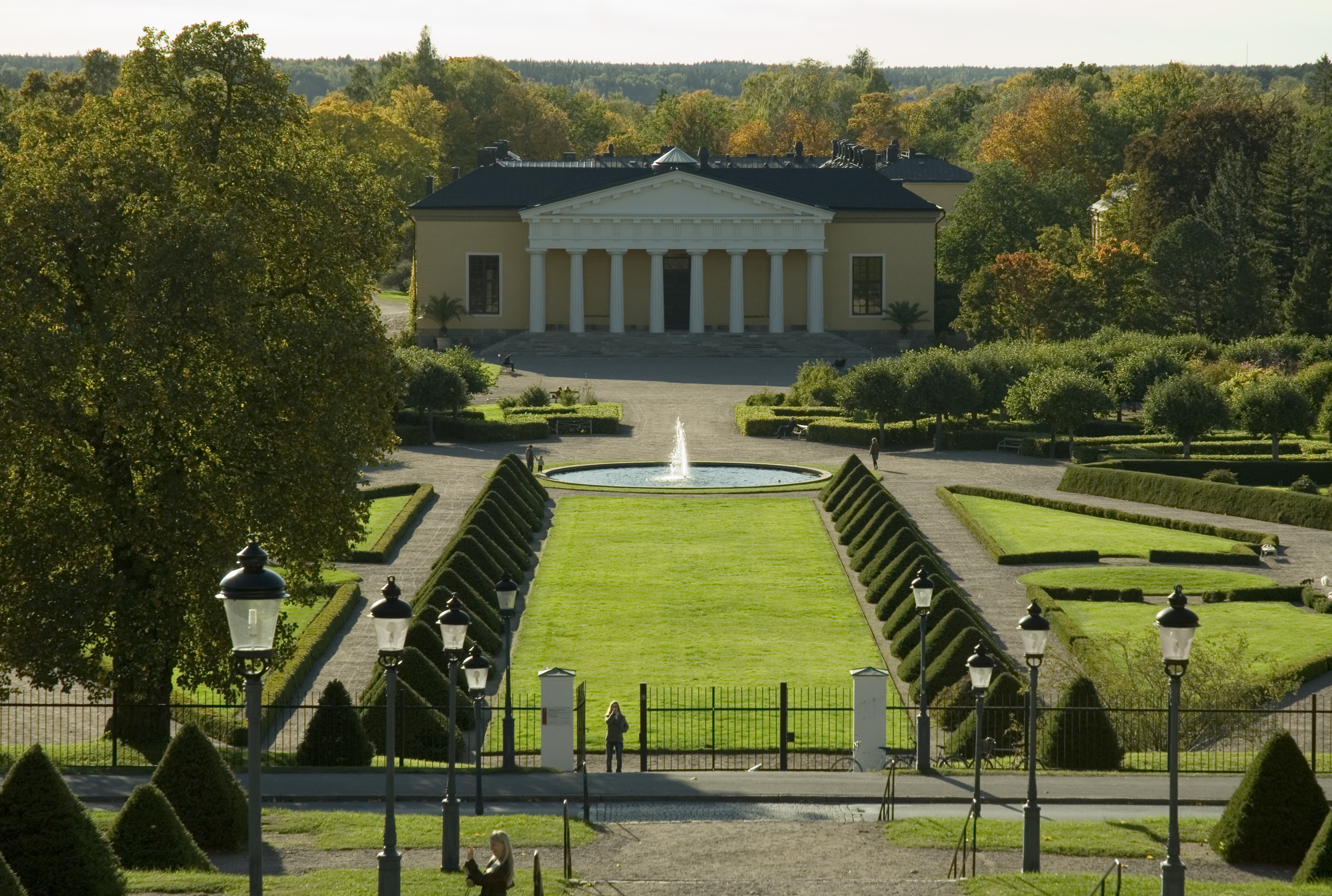
Uppsala University: botanic gardens
