= Mountjoy =

Mountjoy may refer to:

== Places ==
=== Ireland ===
- Mountjoy Prison, a medium security prison in Dublin, Ireland opened in 1850
- Mountjoy Square, a city square in Dublin

=== United Kingdom ===
- Brockagh (also known as Mountjoy), a hamlet in County Tyrone, Northern Ireland
- Mountjoy Castle, a castle in Magheralamfield, County Tyrone, Northern Ireland
- Mountjoy, a former barony of Ireland, now known as Dungannon Upper, in County Tyrone, Northern Ireland
- Mountjoy, Durham, an escarpment south of Durham, England, where pilgrims got their first view of the cathedral, now home to a campus of Durham University

=== Elsewhere ===
- Mountjoy, a neighbourhood in Timmins, Ontario, Canada
- Monte do Gozo (Mountjoy), the hill near Santiago de Compostela, Spain, where pilgrims get their first sight of the cathedral
- Mons Gaudi (Mountjoy), now Nabi Samwil, the hill roughly 4 kilometers (2.5 miles) north of Jerusalem where the army of the First Crusade rejoiced upon getting their first glimpse of Jerusalem in June of 1099

== People ==
=== Title ===
- Baron Mountjoy, a hereditary title given to the men of two families
  - William Blount, 4th Baron Mountjoy (died 1534)
  - Charles Blount, 5th Baron Mountjoy (1516–1544)
  - Charles Blount, 1st Earl of Devonshire, Lord Mountjoy, Lord Deputy of Ireland

=== Surname ===
- Celeste Mountjoy, Australian artist and illustrator
- Dick Mountjoy (1932–2015), American politician from California
- Don Mountjoy (1906–1988), Australian politician
- Doug Mountjoy (1942–2021), Welsh Snooker player
- Eric W. Mountjoy (1931–2010), Canadian emeritus professor at McGill University
- Penelope Mountjoy, archaeologist

=== Given name ===
- Mountjoy Blount, 1st Earl of Newport (c. 1563–1606), illegitimate son of Charles Blount, 1st Earl of Devonshire

=== Fictional ===
- Mountjoy (comics), a mutant in the Marvel Comics Universe
- Montjoy, the French herald in Shakespeare's Henry V

== Ships ==
- The Mountjoy was a merchant ship used to relieve the Siege of Derry in Ulster in 1689.
- Mountjoy was the codename for the ship used in the 1914 Larne Gun Running.

== Music ==
- "Mountjoy" (song), from the 2014 album World Peace Is None of Your Business

== See also ==
- Mount Joy (disambiguation)
- Montjoi (disambiguation)
- Montjoie (disambiguation)
