= Mount Joy =

Mount Joy may refer to:

== Antigua and Barbuda ==
- Mount Joy, Antigua and Barbuda, a locality in Vernons

== Canada ==
- Mount Joy, Ontario, a community in Canada
  - Mount Joy GO Station, a station in this community

== United States ==
- Mount Joy, New Jersey
- Mount Joy, Ohio
- Mount Joy Township, Adams County, Pennsylvania
- Mount Joy Township, Lancaster County, Pennsylvania
  - Mount Joy, Pennsylvania, a borough of Lancaster County
    - Mount Joy (Amtrak station), a station in this borough
- Mount Joy (Whitemarsh, Pennsylvania), a historic house in Montgomery County
- Mount Joy, an unincorporated community in Scott County, Iowa
- Mount Joy, a small mountain in Valley Forge National Historical Park

== United Kingdom ==
- A small hill on Mountjoy escarpment near Durham

== Other uses ==
- Mt. Joy (band)
  - Mt. Joy, the band's eponymous debut album, 2018
- Mt. Joy (restaurant)

== See also ==
- Mountjoy (disambiguation)
