= Wolfson Research Institute =

Research institution of Durham University

Coordinates: 54.5636°N 1.2964°W

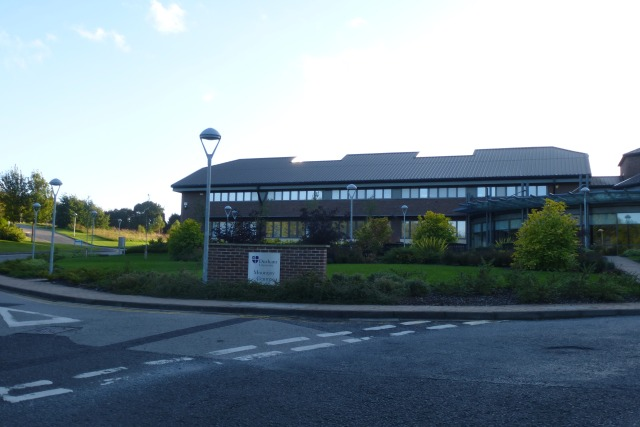
The Mountjoy Centre, home of the Wolfson Research Institute

The Wolfson Research Institute for Health and Wellbeing is an interdisciplinary research centre within Durham University. It is based in the Mountjoy Centre on the university's Upper Mountjoy Campus.

The institute's core staff comprises an Executive Director, Co-Directors, and ECR Director and an Institute Manager who handles the administration of the institute. The team are responsible for supporting both a fellowship and Early Career Researcher program that comprises Durham academics/researchers whose research focuses on interdisciplinary research in health and wellbeing as well as the application of health research on society. External Honorary Professors and Fellows are appointed on the basis of their seniority and collaboration with the institute. The institute's management board is composed of academic members of the university who represent their departments, ECR and College reps and is chaired by the Executive Director.

== History ==
Initial funding for the institute (originally known as the Wolfson Research Institute for Health, Medicine and the Environment) came from the Wolfson Foundation with a £4 million grant in 1999. A further £3.5 million was provided by the European Regional Development Fund towards the overall building cost of £10 million. Construction began in 2001, with the building housing offices and wet laboratories. The institute was formally opened on 17 June 2002 by Baroness Susan Greenfield.

The first director of the institute was Professor Charlie Heywood of the Department of Psychology. He was followed by Professor Ray Hudson of the Department of Geography and then Professor Tim Blackman of the School of Applied Social Sciences. Professor Blackman was succeeded by Professor Clare Bambra of the Department of Geography (2011), and then Professor Jan Illing of the School of Medicine Pharmacy and Health took over as Interim director (2014). Professor Illing was succeeded by Professor Ian Greener (2015) from the School of Applied Social Sciences. The current Executive Director (since 2016) is Professor Amanda Ellison of the Psychology Department.

=== Notable research ===
In 2007, research at the institution found that implementation of the Disability Discrimination Act, intended to reduce discrimination against disabled people, had actually had the effect of reducing employment of disabled people. This effect was concentrated on the least skilled occupational sectors, with no significant decrease being seen in professional occupations.

In 2010, a review by the institute of ten independent studies found that workers who have more control over their working hours through flexible working policies are better rested and less stressed, leading to better health.

In 2013, analysis by the institute of the plans for resource allocation within NHS England found that the plans would decrease spending in poorer areas with worse health outcomes and increase spending in richer, healthier areas. According to academics from the institute quoted in the national press, this would "undermine the principle of 'equal opportunity of access for equal need'".

In 2014, research by the institute in collaboration with the universities of Liverpool, West of Scotland, Glasgow and Edinburgh found that rising inequality, unemployment, welfare cuts and housing policies under the government of Margaret Thatcher caused 30,000 premature deaths and led to lasting regional disparities in health and life expectancy.

== Fellowship ==
Fellows of the institute are nominated by their head of department and two other fellows. Upon successful application to the scheme, fellows can access several modes of support, including peer review of grant applications, ethics advice, advice on funding opportunities and promoting of achievements.

Fellows of the institute are a broad mix of academics from across almost all Durham University Departments. In 2021, there were over 140 fellows.

== Research areas and outreach activities ==
Research within the umbrella of the institute is originated by the Fellows, whose work is returned to their home departments. Individual research interests within the Fellowship are highly variable as a reflection of the overall diversity of academic work within the university. The Institute does not produce any research outputs directly but supports and promotes interdisciplinary research in Health and Wellbeing.

The institute publishes a fortnightly newsletter. The newsletter contains news of Fellows' achievements, grant calls and successes and any events organised and hosted by the Institute including public seminars and conferences. External Events of interest are also included to promote engagement and networking.
