= Montjoie =

Montjoie may refer to:

== Places ==
=== France ===
- Montjoie-le-Château, a commune in Doubs
- Montjoie-Saint-Martin, a commune in Manche
- Montjoie-en-Couserans, a commune in Ariège
- Saint-Michel-de-Montjoie, a commune in Manche
- Les Contamines-Montjoie, a commune in Haute-Savoie

=== Germany ===
- Montjoie, alternate name for Monschau (North Rhine-Westphalia)

=== Palestine ===
- Montjoie, the mountain of Nabi Samwil from which the Crusaders first could see Jerusalem

== Other ==
- Order of Montjoie, a military order during the Crusades.
- Montjoie, a French battle standard known as an oriflamme.
- Montjoie Saint Denis!, the motto of the Kingdom of France
- Montjoie!, a historical French cultural magazine edited by Ricciotto Canudo et al.

== See also ==
- Montjoi (disambiguation)
- Mountjoy (disambiguation)
- Monte do Gozo
