= Montjoi =

Montjoi may refer to the following places in France:

- Montjoi, Aude, a commune in the Aude department
- Montjoi, Tarn-et-Garonne, a commune in the Tarn-et-Garonne department

== See also ==
- Montjoie (disambiguation)
