= Lower Mountjoy Teaching and Learning Centre =

Educational building of Durham University in Durham, England

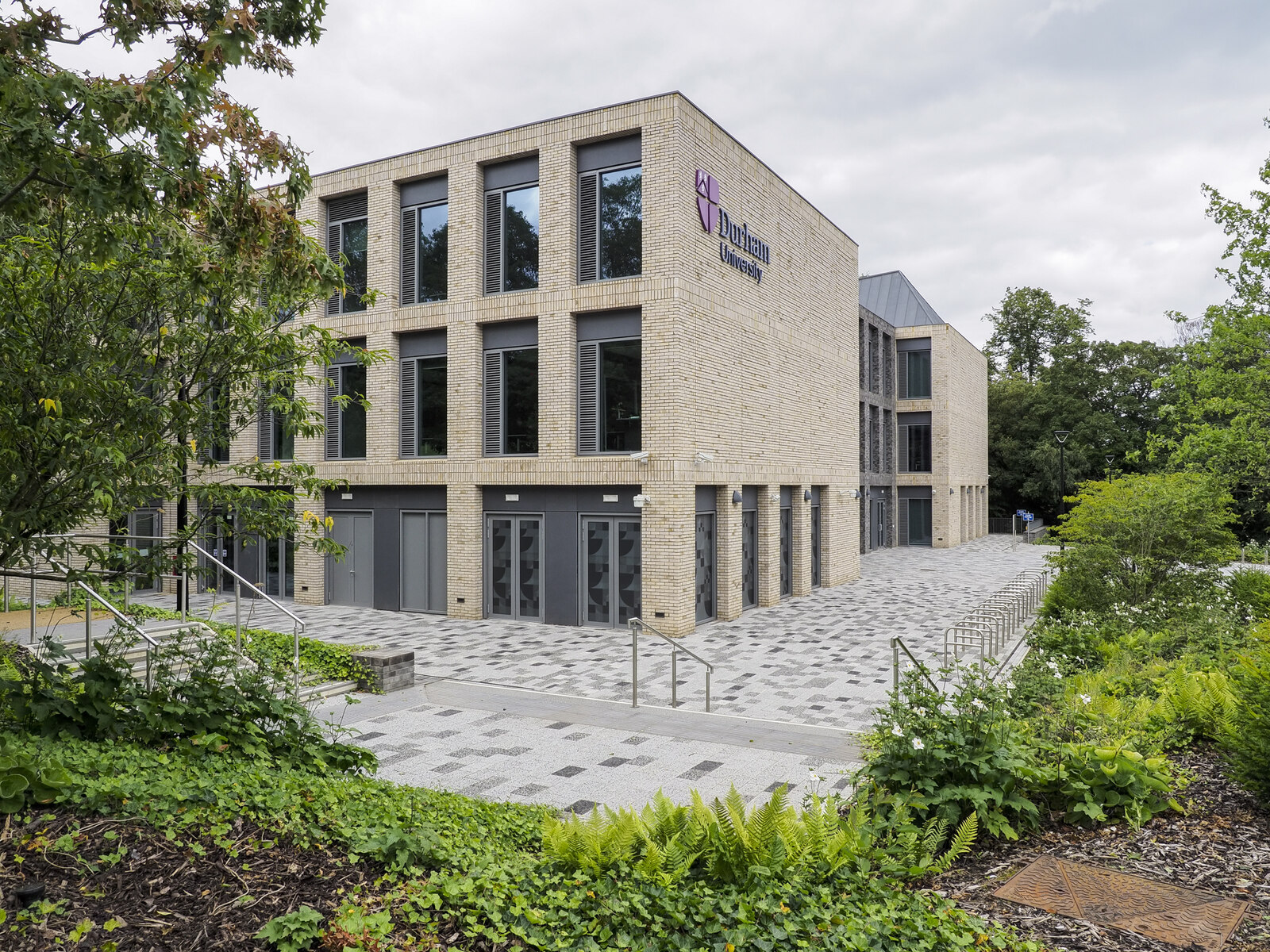
- Interactive map of the Lower Mountjoy Teaching and Learning Centre area

General information
- Architectural style: Contemporary; complementary
- Location: South Road, Durham, DH1 3LS, Durham, England
- Coordinates: 54°46′02″N 1°34′34″W
- Elevation: 66.0 metres (216.5 ft)
- Construction started: 14 December 2017
- Completed: 17 September 2019
- Inaugurated: 9 December 2019
- Cost: £25 million
- Owner: Durham University

Height
- Height: 16.2 m (53 ft)

Dimensions
- Other dimensions: 66 m × 54 m (217 ft × 177 ft)

Technical details
- Floor count: 3
- Floor area: 8,250 m^{2} (88,800 sq ft)

Design and construction
- Architect: FaulknerBrowns Architects
- Awards: RIBA National Award 2021; Civic Trust Awards: Highly Commended 2021

Other information
- Parking: 3 disabled spaces

The Lower Mountjoy Teaching and Learning Centre (TLC) is an educational building of Durham University in Durham, England. It is intended to blend into the Durham area, including views of the Durham Castle and Cathedral World Heritage Site, with a design that breaks up the bulk of the building. The building won a RIBA National Award for its architecture and was highly commended in the Civic Trust Awards. It was officially opened on 9 December 2019, having been in use since the start of the 2019/20 academic year in September. It was designed by FaulknerBrowns Architects and constructed at a cost of £25 million by Galliford Try with engineering by Buro Happold. The total project cost was £40 million.

== Site ==
The Teaching and Learning Centre was built on a former sports field owned by the university between Vincent Harris's neoclassical St Mary's College and the Edwardian Arts and Crafts-style Bow School, directly opposite Daniel Liebeskind's deconstructivist Ogden Centre for Fundamental Physics, on the university's Lower Mountjoy campus on the other side of South Road. It overlooks Durham Cathedral, a World Heritage Site, and is just outside the Durham City Conservation Area.

== Architecture ==
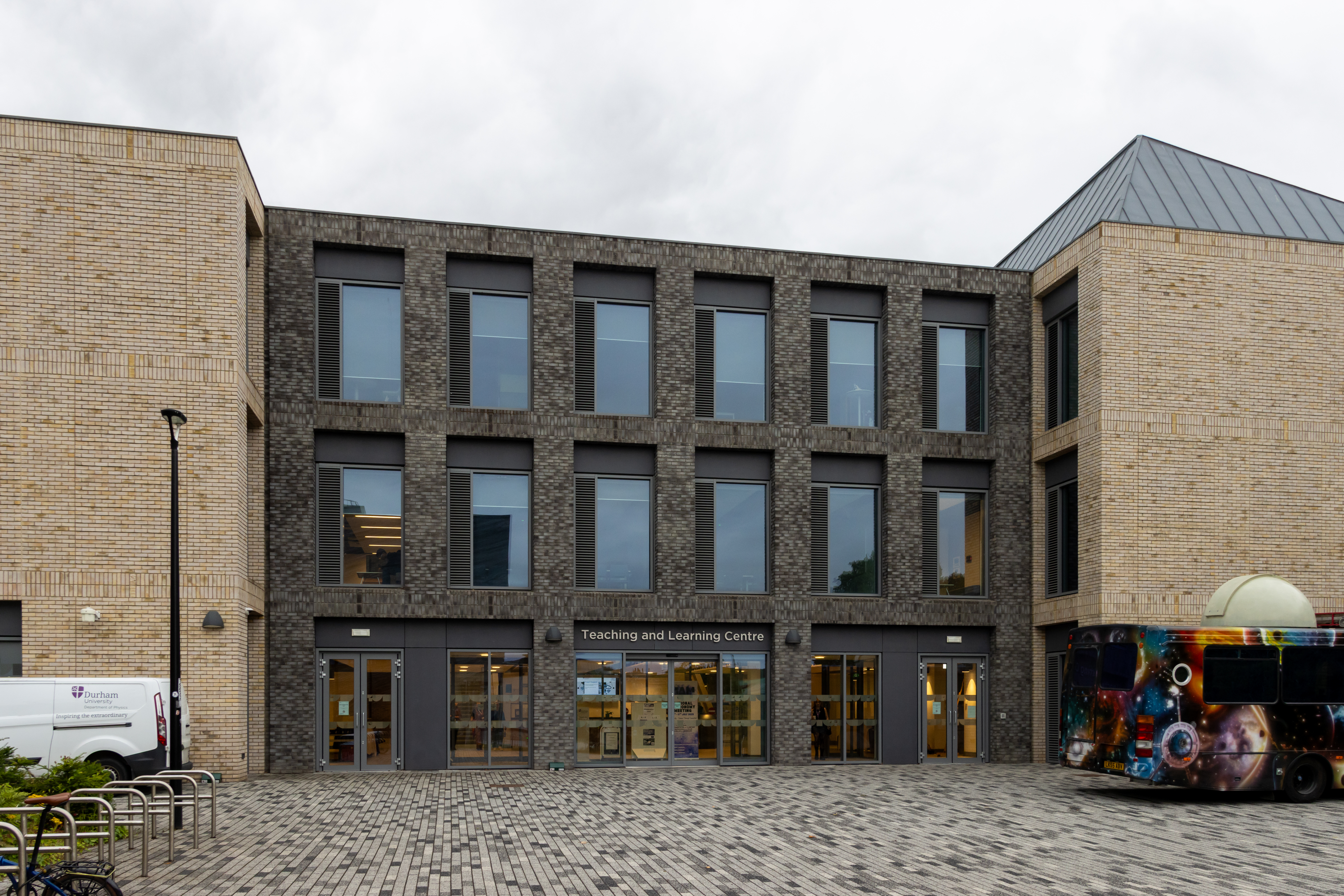
The front entrance, showing the different coloured brickwork on the protruding and recessed sections

The concept for the teaching and learning centre is of a shared space, reflecting a collaborative approach to learning that was integrated into Durham University's 2017–2027 masterplan. The centre is thus not a facility designed for any particular faculty or department but instead is intended a 'melting pot' for ideas. FaulknerBrown, the principal architects on the project, conducted research on the impact of spatial design on learning at leading international business schools, resulting in the spatial model of the teaching and learning centre as a structures around a central (enclosed) courtyard. The glass skylight over this courtyard incorporates thin photovoltaic films, generating renewable energy.

In order to create a large building that hid its bulk, so as not to intrude on views of the world heritage site, the centre was designed around twelve modular "houses", each measuring 15 m × 18 m (49 ft × 59 ft). These were arranged in varying orientations in a three wide by four deep pattern, with one inner module left empty as a full-height interior courtyard covered by a glass roof. Each module has an asymmetric pyramidal roof topped with a skylight, the different orientations and the use of a reflected symmetry giving eight different roof patterns so only three are repeated. The modules being rectangular rather than square, the different orientations also led to them protruding or being recessed, breaking up the side of the building into smaller units. As the modules are used to organise the interior, the way their arrangement affects the shape of the outer wall also reflects the way these divide the interior of the building or, in the case where two modules are joined to form a single large lecture theatre, giving the only two-module-wide section of unbroken outer wall, how they are combined. The colour of the brickwork on the facings was chosen to be similar to St Mary's College, except in recessed facings where a darker shade was used to aid in breaking up the bulk of the building, while the jumble of asymmetric roofs is intended to reflect the roofline of the city houses.

The architecture designed by FaulknerBrowns establishes itself entirely opposed to that of Daniel Libeskind, who in 2017, realized the Astronomy department’s Research Center with an angular and asymmetric pavilion that hides fluid spaces inside. Instead, at the Learning Centre, a composition was chosen to communicate — even from the outside — the organization of spaces and internal halls, which are easily traced by the sweeping windows.

— Ciro Marco Musella, Elle Decor

The entrance plaza on the east side is joined to the main Lower Mountjoy site via a pedestrian crossing on South Road. Despite the deliberate asymmetries in the design, the entrance is symmetrical, with a recessed entrance flanked by protruding wings. This gives the impression of a building fighting its own symmetry, described by Hugh Pearman as "a bit like the insect alien in Men in Black, scarcely able to remain within the forcibly-obtained human skin he has occupied".

The building was designed to meet the BREEAM Excellent standard and an Energy Performance Certificate 'A' rating.

== Construction ==
Planning permission was granted by Durham County Council on 13 September 2017. Work began with a turf cutting ceremony on 14 December 2017, with Alan Houston (pro vice chancellor for education at Durham University), Sabrina Seel (postgraduate academic officer at Durham Students' Union) and Jeremey Barnett (operations director at Galliford Try). The construction was led by Galliford Try with engineering provided by Buro Happold and cost £25 million, with a total project cost of £40 million.

The building was handed over on 17 September 2019. The official opening then took place on 9 December 2019, and science and universities minister Chris Skidmore gave an opening speech on 24 January 2020.

== Awards ==
The Lower Mountjoy Teaching and Learning Centre won "Best Public Service or Educational Building" at the Local Authority Building Control (LABC) Northern Building Excellence Awards in September 2020. Due to the COVID pandemic, no national 'Grand Final' was held for the LABC 2020 awards and most other awards were postponed until 2021.

In August 2021, the Teaching and Learning Centre won a Royal Institute of British Architects (RIBA) Regional Award for the North East of England, going on to win a RIBA National Award later that year. The judges praised the way the design minimised the appearance of volume in the building, saying: "This is a substantial building in volume, but a clever and layered design approach has resulted in it feeling appropriate in its context where it could easily have felt imposing." They also singled out the contribution made by the design of the roof: "The roof forms are one of the key elements of the design. The architects have created a roofscape that responds to the conservation and UNESCO world heritage site setting. The series of zinc standing seam asymmetric pyramidal forms are rotated to echo the ad hoc evolution of the mediaeval rooftops of the city, and this connection is highly successful."

The judges for the 2021 Civic Trust Awards, where the Teaching and Learning Centre was "Highly Commended", agreed, saying that: "Close collaboration with Durham County Council planners helped deliver a successful massing strategy. The building volume was broken down into an assembly of smaller repeated elements to relate more closely to the prevailing grain of the city." And also: "The dynamic roof profile not only delivers complexity and interest in the external form, it also creates a series of dramatic top-lit ceiling coffers to the upper-level open learning commons - a modern interpretation of the traditional reading room."

The centre also won an AV Technology Award for Education Project of the Year 2020, for its IT and audio-visual systems.

== Facilities ==
The centre includes two large tiered lecture theatres, with capacities of 500 and 250 people, as well as a number of smaller flat rooms that can be arranged in multiple layouts. As lecture rooms, these include two 100-person rooms, two 80-person rooms and two 53-person rooms, as well as three seminar rooms with a capacity of 24 people. There are also 400 spaces for independent study or group work on the top floor of the building.

On the ground floor, students and visitors can enjoy the café (named "Zing Kitchen"), offering a variety of hot beverages, snacks, and paninis.

In addition to teaching, the centre was designed to support conferences outside of term time, with the stated aim of boosting the local economy by £2 million per year and attracting up to 4,500 conference attendees during university vacations.

=== Durham Centre for Academic Development ===
The Durham Centre for Academic Development (DCAD) has its main offices in the teaching and learning centre. DCAD is responsible for lecturer, researcher and student development, with divisions including an education lab, a digital learning team and Durham's foundation programmes. It is also responsible for supporting the teaching of staff and postgraduates, similar to the teaching and learning centres found at many US universities.
