= Mountjoy, Durham =

Escarpment in Durham, England

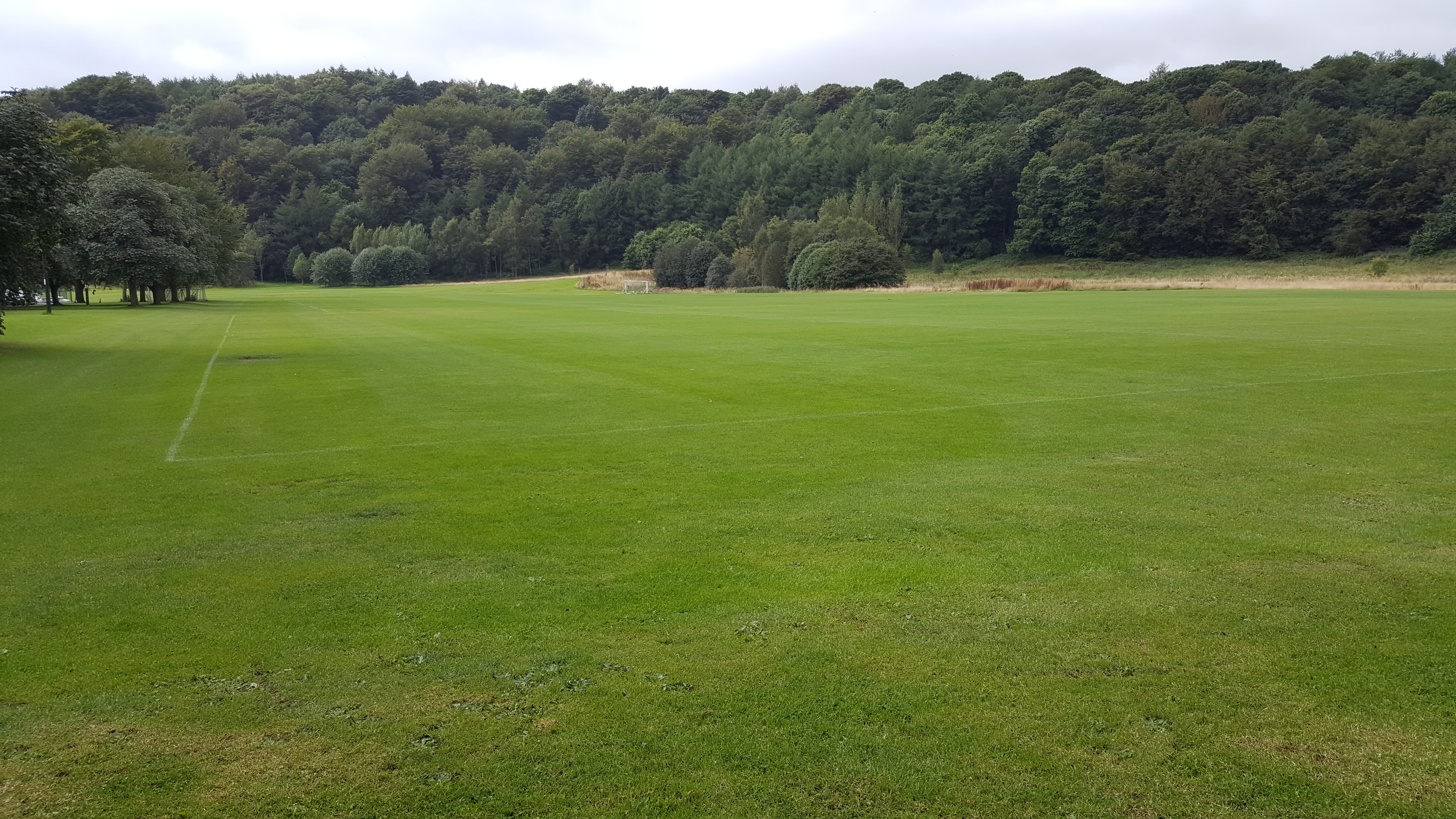
The east scarp face of Mountjoy seen from East Durham College, Houghall Campus

Mountjoy or Mount Joy is an escarpment above the valley of the River Wear approximately 1 kilometre (0.62 miles) southeast of the city of Durham, England, rising to a height of slightly over 100 metres (330 ft). Its name comes from medieval pilgrims travelling to Durham Cathedral, who would get their first close view of the cathedral after climbing the southern scarp face. Modern pilgrims continue to use this route, and the view from the top of Mountjoy is one of the key viewpoints of the Durham Castle and Cathedral World Heritage Site. The site is also associated with legends of the arrival of St Cuthbert's body in Durham. Archaeology has identified a Bronze Age enclosure, a possible Neolithic or Bronze Age settlement, and Iron Age and Romano-British field systems on Mountjoy.

The hill has a variety of land uses, with academic buildings – including some award-winning and controversial 21st-century designs – on Durham University's Upper Mountjoy and Lower Mountjoy sites on the gentle northern slopes, containing all of the departments in the university's faculty of science and most of the departments in the faculty of social science and health. Two of the university's residential colleges are built on Buck's Hill, on the western side of Mountjoy. The scarp slopes are covered by ancient woodland, while the university's botanic garden, locally listed as a historic park, lies in a valley on the southwest side of the hill. The woodland and the undeveloped eastern part of Mountjoy are part of the Hollingside, Mountjoy and Whinney Hill area of high landscape value and form part of the Durham City Green Belt.

== Geography ==
Mountjoy is described in a 2011 archaeological survey as "a prominent NE-SW escarpment which falls sharply away to the wide floodplain of the River Wear to the south-east, and to the Wear itself, looping around Durham City, only 1 km to the north-west". There is an almost right angle corner in the scarp at the east end of the escarpment, where it turns from running approximately east-northeast along the south side of the escarpment to running north. There is an abandoned service reservoir on the ridge at this point, and a 21st-century service reservoir just to the north of this, with a spot height of 101m on the footpath just northeast of the abandoned reservoir in a Durham University site plan.

The bedrock beneath Mountjoy and the surrounding area is the Pennine Middle Coal Measures, composed of sandstone in some areas and of mudstone, siltstone and sandstone in others. The superficial deposits are Devensian glaciofluvial deposits. This separates Mountjoy from the Holocene river terrace deposits of Elvet, north of Stockton Road, and the alluvium of the Wear floodplain.

On the western part of the escarpment, the lower (north) and upper (south) parts are separated by the steep wooded slope of the Little High Wood, considered to probably be ancient woodland and listed as such and as a local wildlife area in the County Durham Local Plan. There is a more gentle slope on the eastern part of Mountjoy, north of the reservoirs, in a field traditionally known as "Long Rigg" and referred to in the archaeological report as the east field, with a road connecting upper and lower Mountjoy. The Little High Wood and the east field are included in the Durham City Green Belt and the Hollingside, Mountjoy and Whinney Hill area of high landscape value. The Mountjoy ridgeline forms the edge of the "inner setting" for the Durham City World Heritage Site, with most of Mountjoy therefore within the inner setting.

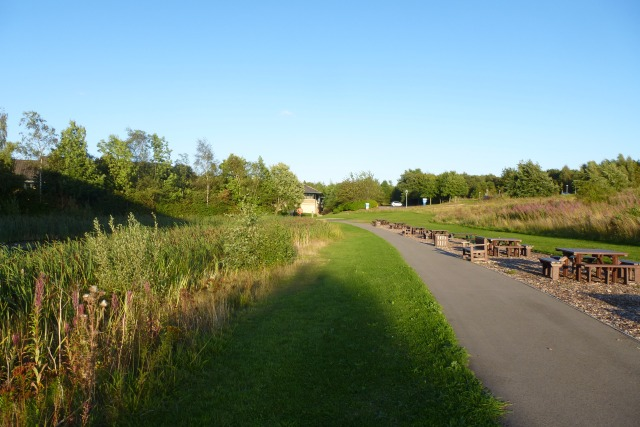
A picnic area by a pond in Upper Mountjoy. The rise to the right is now occupied by the Mathematical Sciences and Computer Science building.

South of the Little High Wood is a plateau with three prominences, two of them (arranged approximately north-south) in the university's Upper Mountjoy site with heights of 105 metres (344 ft) for the northern prominence and 106 metres (348 ft) for the southern prominence, which stands on the ridge just north of the scarp, on the Durham University site plan. The third prominence, just south of Grey College, lies below the 105-metre (344 ft) contour.

The south and east sides of Mountjoy are bounded by the scarp, falling to the floodplain of the Wear, while to the north the A177 Stockton Road divides Mountjoy from the flatter (and geological distinct) lands of the Elvet river terrace and from Whinney Hill (82 metres (269 ft)). The western side of Mountjoy is also defined by the steep slopes of Buck's Hill. The A177 South Road, formerly the Great North Road, runs west of Buck's Hill, passing between Mountjoy and Windmill Hill and across the approximately 80-metre (260 ft) high Elvet Hill plateau before descending along towards the city. Hollingside Lane comes off this road, climbing the western slope of Mountjoy before turning to follow the ridge leading south from Buck's Hill to Pinnock Hill (82 metres (269 ft)).

=== Buck's Hill ===
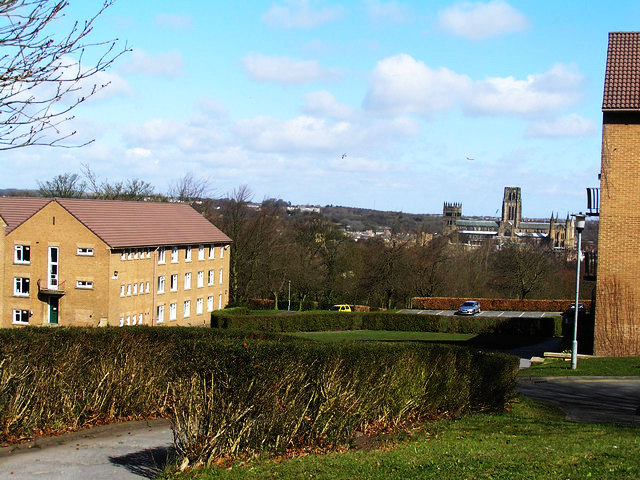
View of Durham Cathedral from Grey College on Buck's Hill

The western part of the escarpment is known as Buck's Hill. However, the part of Mountjoy identified by this name varies between sources. The area containing Grey College and Collingwood College is topographically part of Mountjoy but was historically part of Elvet Moor rather than the Mountjoy estate; This division remains reflected in the boundary between the 'academic' zones of Upper and Lower Mountjoy and the 'residential' zones of the hill colleges in the Durham University Estates Masterplan. When Elvet Moor was inclosed, Buck's Hill Plantation and the Buck's Hill Well were set aside in this area. The westernmost prominence, just south of Grey College, is labelled as Buck's Hill on old Ordnance Survey maps. This also matches local descriptions such as "Today, it is Durham University's Grey College and Collingwood College that dominate Bucks Hill". Durham County Council planning maps show this westernmost rise as being Buck's Hill, as do the Durham University site plan and the draft Durham City Conservation Area Management Plan. The Buck's Hill postal address also refers to this area. This area, accessed via Hollingside Lane, was separated from Upper Mountjoy, accessed via a road from Lower Mountjoy, until the construction of a new entrance in 2018–20, and is considered by the university to be part of the 'Hill' area rather than the 'Mountjoy' area.

However, modern Ordnance Survey maps label Buck's Hill further east than this. The 106m rise in the southern part of Upper Mountjoy, which was the highest point on the escarpment, is the position shown for "Buck Hill, flint scatter" in the archaeological report (figure 20). This rise has since been reduced by the construction of a car park at this location in 2018–20. The Ordnance Survey Open Names database places the point position for Buck's Hill slightly south of this, on a high point on the ridge itself.

=== Mount Joy hill ===
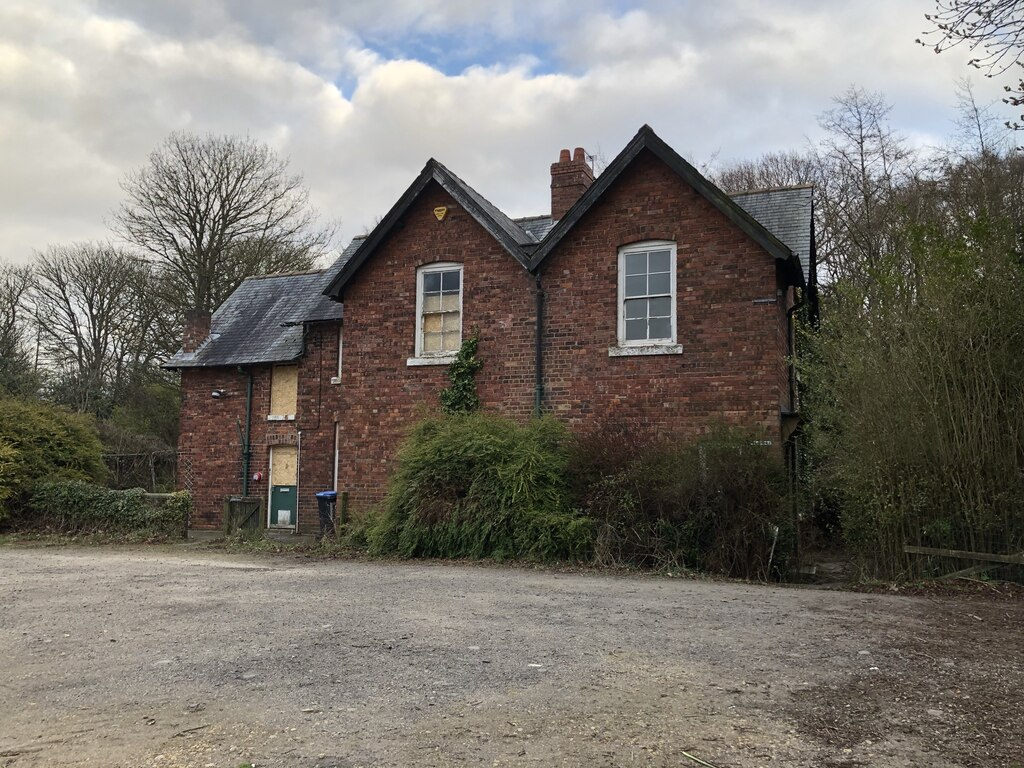
The derelict Mount Joy Farm, on the south side of Mount Joy hill

From the eastern end of the Mountjoy escarpment, the scarp runs northwards and a ridge links the escarpment to a peak marked "Mountjoy" on older Ordnance Survey maps and "Mount Joy" on more recent maps, noted by the archaeological survey as "not to be confused with the site reported here". The peak lies between the 80m and 85m contours. North of this there is a deeper valley separating Mount Joy from Whinney Hill and Maiden Castle, where the A177 Stockton Road climbs the scarp at Shincliffe Peth. Mount Joy is part of the Durham City Conservation Area, referred to as an "important wedge of green space around Mountjoy Farm". Mount Joy is also included in the Durham City Green Belt and the Hollingside, Mountjoy and Whinney Hill area of high landscape value.

=== Great High Wood ===
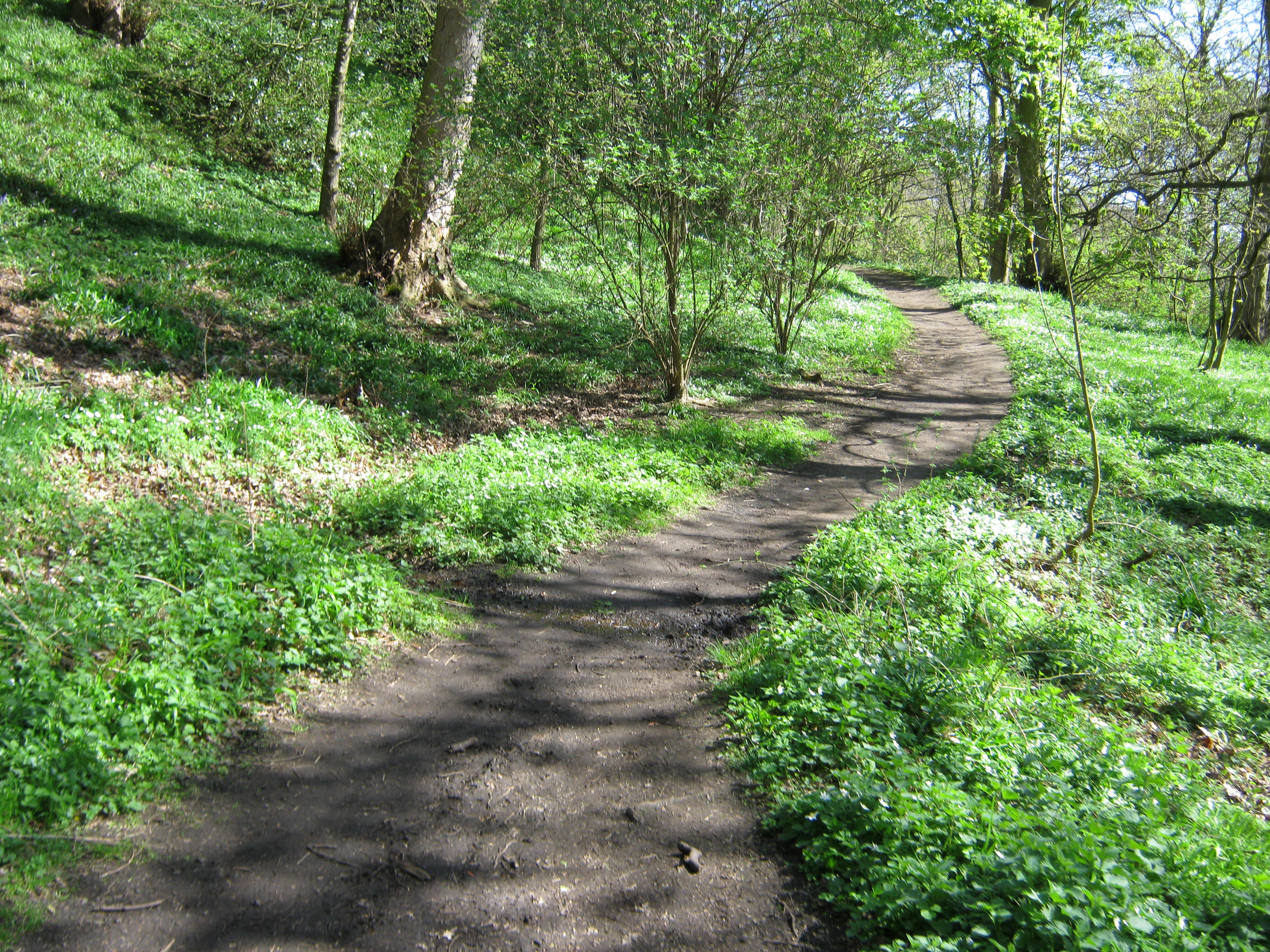
Footpath through the Great High Wood

The Great High Wood, identified as an ancient woodland by Natural England and in the Durham County Local Plan, stands on the scarp slope south and east of Mountjoy. The scarp meets the floodplain of the river Wear at an elevation of around 45m on the south side, falling to around 40m on the east side. The Great High Wood joins with Maiden Castle Wood on the scarp on the north side of the A177 and with the Hollinside Wood on the scarp south of Mountjoy. The Great High Wood and Hollinside Wood are also included in the Durham City Green Belt and the Hollingside, Mountjoy and Whinney Hill area of high landscape value, as well as being designated local wildlife sites, sites of nature conservation importance and sites of ecological value and being included as local green spaces in the Durham City Neighbourhood Plan.

== History ==
=== Archaeology ===
Archaeological excavations in 2003–7 in preparation for construction of a new service reservoir discovered a previously unknown prehistoric site consisting of an enclosure estimated to be at least 0.75 hectares (1.9 acres) in size, with diameter within the inner ditch of around 100 metres (330 ft) and two further ditches outside this. The enclosure was in use from around 1700–1500 BC, in the final phase of the Early Bronze Age, and was abandoned around 1300 BC, in the Middle Bronze Age. It was the first site of its type to be identified in northern Britain and possibly the first Middle Bronze Age site found in north east England. Early analysis had given dates as early as 3000 BC and appeared to show that the site was neither defensive nor a settlement, leading to speculation that it was a spiritual site, referred to in the press as a "prehistoric Glastonbury". However, radio carbon dating provided evidence that the site was not Neolithic, although it remained the case that its closest counterparts were late Neolithic enclosures that "probably defined ritual or ceremonial areas". It therefore provided evidence that new building following late Neolithic cultural traditions continued into the Bronze Age. Excavations lower on Mountjoy in 2009–2011 in preparation for the construction of the Palatine Centre and the extension of the Bill Bryson Library showed evidence for a possible Neolithic or Bronze Age settlement from evaluation of artefacts.

Further excavations in the higher part of Mountjoy in 2009–2020 in preparation for construction of buildings and car parks in Upper Mountjoy revealed the existence of Iron Age and Romano-British field systems 150 metres (490 ft) southwest of the Bronze Age enclosure, as well as sporadic Bronze Age use of this part of the hill and Mesolithic and Neolithic flints. The components of the Iron Age field system date from 810 BC to 20 AD, after which the site artists to have been abandoned. The Romano-British field system was then created slightly east of this in the late 2nd or early 3rd century and was in turn abandoned by the 5th century.

=== Legends of St Cuthbert ===
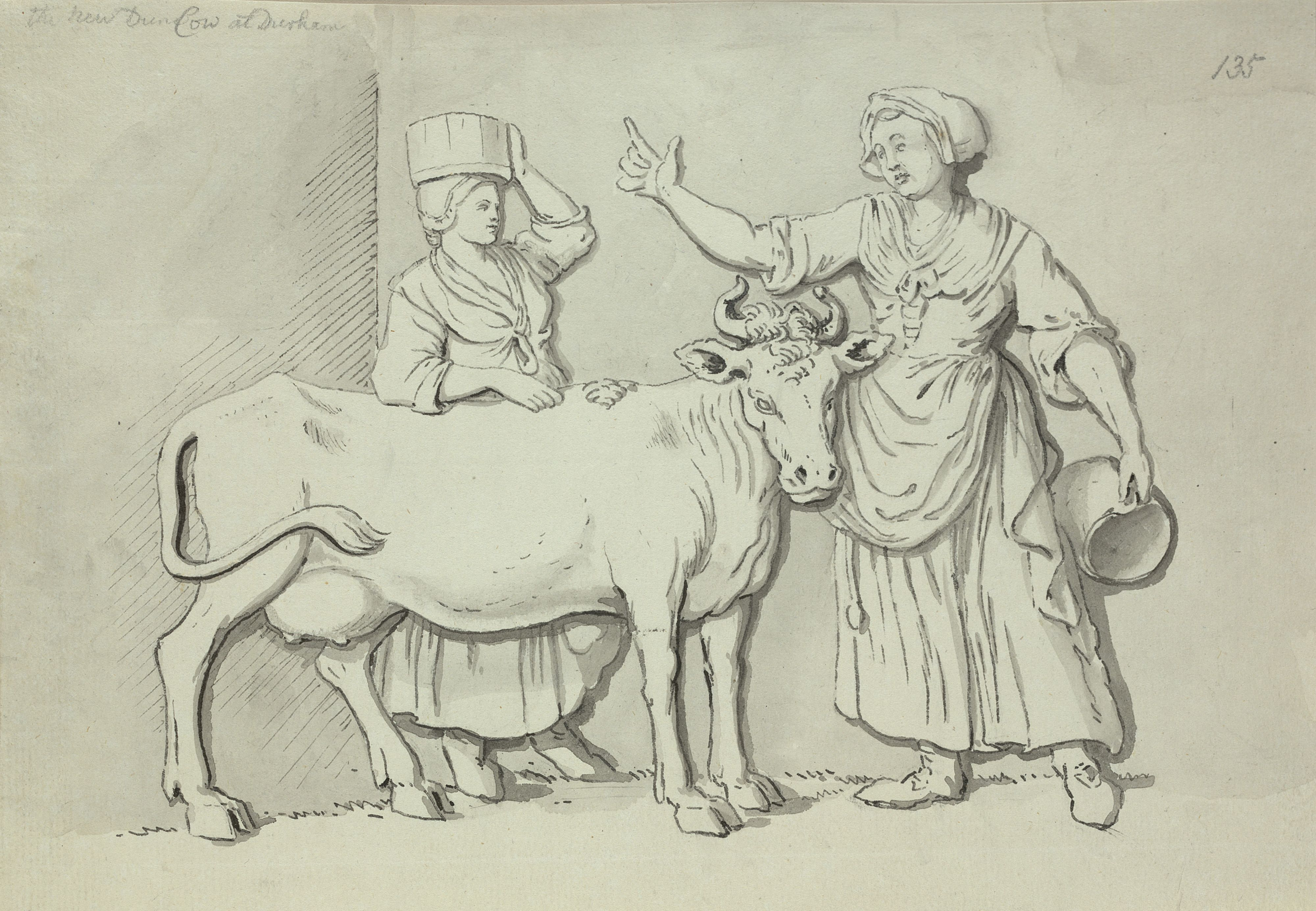
Drawing by Samuel Hieronymus Grimm of the dun cow and the two milkmaids, now in the British Museum

St Cuthbert was a 7th century bishop of Lindisfarne. When Lindisfarne was abandoned due to Viking raids in 875, his body was translated, among with the bishopric, to Chester-le-Street, 6 miles (10 km) north of Durham. In 995, Bishop Aldhun removed St Cuthbert's body and his community from Chester-le-Street to Ripon to avoid Viking raids. Later that year, the threat having passed, they set out to return but ended up settling at Durham instead.

The 12th century scribe Symeon of Durham recounts the legend that when St Cuthbert's body was being returned from Ripon it came to a halt at "a spot near Durham called Wurdelau, on the eastern side of the city", also described as being "in the middle of a plain, which was then uninhabitable". This was interpreted as meaning the Saint did not want to be returned "to his former place of evidence". After three days of fasting, a vision revealed that St Cuthbert wanted to be taken to Dunholme (Durham) instead.

The Victoria County History of Durham interprets Symeon's "near Durham" (propre Dunhelmum) as "not likely to have meant anything more distant than the immediate neighbourhood of the city of Durham" and states that local tradition associated this place with Mountjoy. However, other sites have also been identified with this legend: the earlier 19th century historian James Raine states, on the basis of a marginal note by 16th century antiquary John Leland, that, if real, "the place was unquestionably Wardley, in the parish of Jarrow", 12 miles (19 km) north of Durham (with the monks returning not to Chester-le-Street but to Lindisfarne). Another 19th century historian, William Fordyce, states that "antiquarians identify [the site] with Wardonlaw", a hill 8 miles (13 km) northeast of Durham, now on the outskirts of Sunderland, an identification also found elsewhere. It has also been placed in the area of St Oswald's Church in Elvet, on the banks of the Wear below Mountjoy.

An addition to the legend, not recorded by Symeon, states that the monks transporting the body did not know where Dunholme was until they overheard one woman asking another if she had seen her dun cow and being told she had seen it "Down in Dunholme", upon which they followed her to Durham. This encounter is said to have taken place either on Mountjoy or in the place the monks were stuck.

=== Medieval period ===
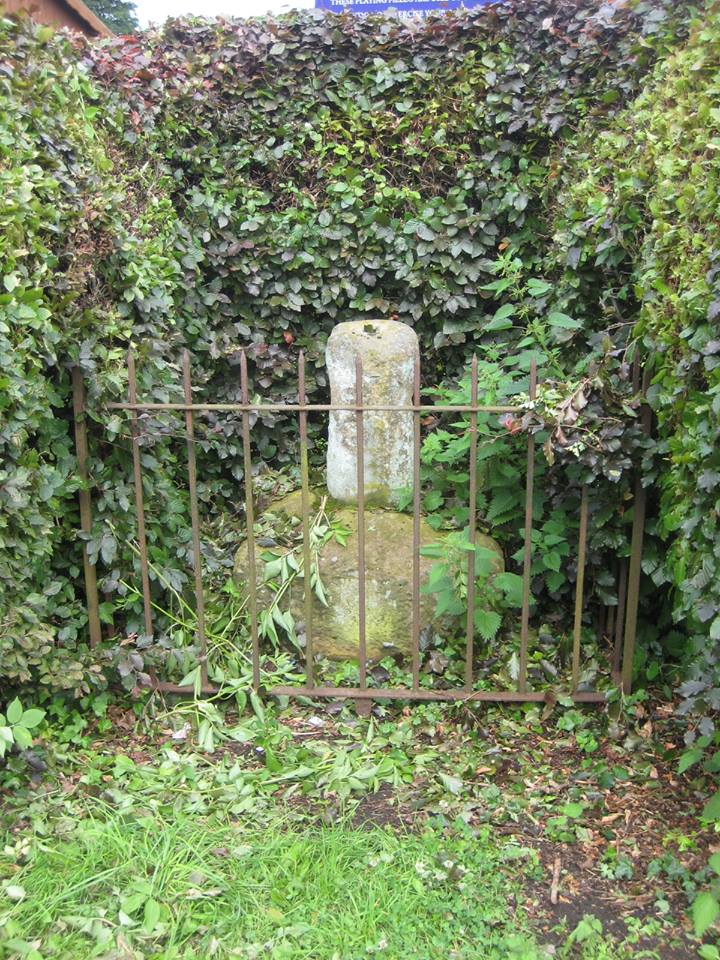
Remains of Charley's Cross at the South Road – Quarryheads Lane – Church Street – Stockton Road junction

After the building of Elvet Bridge in the late 12th century, the main approaches to Durham from the south became via the two roads on the flanks of Mountjoy: South Road (becoming Church Street inside Elvet) and Stockton Road (becoming Halgarth Street inside Elvet).

Two stone crosses on the lower slopes of Mountjoy marked the approaches to Durham on these roads, and possibly the sanctuary area around the Cathedral. The remains of the 14th century Charley's Cross (a grade II listed monument) are still extant at the junction of Stockton Road, South Road, Church Street and Quarryheads Lane, while Phillipson's Cross stood at the junction of Stockton Road and Hallgarth Street, now occupied by Whinny Hill roundabout.

At least the lower slopes of Mountjoy were farmed in this period, with deeds relating to Mountjoy and Swallopleys (Swallop Leazes), the two fields into which the part of Mountjoy north of the Little High Wood was divided, found in the Durham Cathedral Commoners Cartulary, assembled in the 15th century.

=== Early modern period ===
Toll houses were constructed on the roads on the west and north flanks of Mountjoy in the 1740s, following the passing of the Boroughbridge and Durham Road Act 1744 (18 Geo. 2. c. 8), with the Butterby Lane toll at the foot of South Road, then part of the Boroughbridge – Darlington – Durham turnpike on the Great North Road; and the Catterick Bridge to Durham Road Act 1746 (20 Geo. 2. c. 28), with the Hallgarth toll at the top of Shincliffe Peth on Stockton Road, then part of the Catterick Bridge – Yarm – Stockton-on-Tees – Durham turnpike.

Elvet Moor was inclosed by the St. Oswald Inclosure Act 1771 (11 Geo. 3. c. 99 Pr.). This mostly concerned land west of Mountjoy, but the inclosure did affect Buck's Hill. The Buck's Hill Plantation (now a small patch of trees between Grey College and Collingwood College) and Buck's Hill well, located where Grey College now stands in what was once known as Fountain's Field, were set aside for the cathedral. Ground for pipes to bring the well water to the cathedral and castle was also allocated.

=== 19th century ===
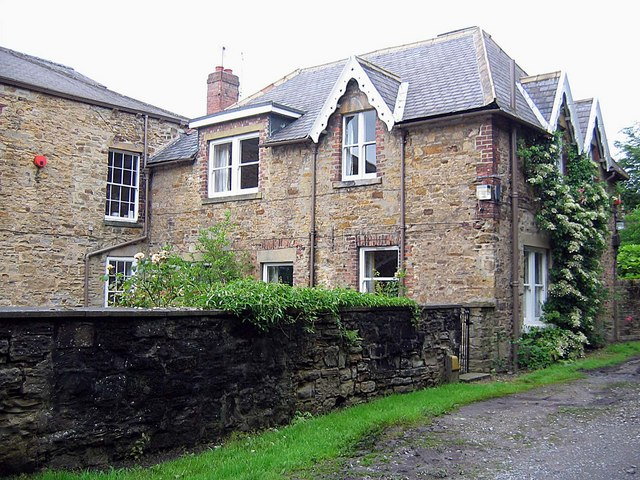
Grade II listed Hollingside House, now the university vice-chancellor and warden's residence

Elvet Colliery opened in 1828. The South Engine Pit on Mountjoy was sunk in 1858 to the Hutton seam at a depth of 62 metres (203 ft).

Mountjoy Cottage was built at top of Mountjoy in the early 19th century. A water company was formed in 1844 and built a service reservoir at the top of Mountjoy, adjacent to Mounjoy Cottage. This was fed with filtered water pumped from the Wear above the city until 1880, when the water company was taken over and water from Waskerley, near Consett, was used instead.

The Mountjoy estate was attached to the first prebendal stall of Durham Cathedral. Following the founding of Durham University in 1832 and the death of Thomas Gisborne, then holder of the first stall, in 1846, it was transferred from the cathedral to the university by an order in council to form part of its endowment. A plan of the lands transferred, from c. 1846, shows the Mountjoy service reservoir but does not show the Elvet Colliery, which is shown on the first Ordnance Survey map from 1860.

During the 19th century, a number of large houses were built on Elvet Moor. These included Oswald House on the south slope of Buck's Hill, built by George Wilkinson by 1838, (Note: Mount Oswald, a short way south, was also originally called Oswald House and was owned between 1806 and 1828 by Thomas Wilkinson, father of George) and the grade II listed Hollingside House on Hollingside Lane, home of John Bacchus Dykes from 1850 to 1852 and now the residence of the Vice-Chancellor and Warden of Durham University. Oswald House was demolished following a fire in 1960, and Collingwood College was constructed on its site. The late-Victorian Mount Joy Farm, built in the dip between Mountjoy escarpment and Mount Joy hill, is considered a non-designated heritage asset and is included in the Durham City list of heritage at risk.

=== 20th century ===
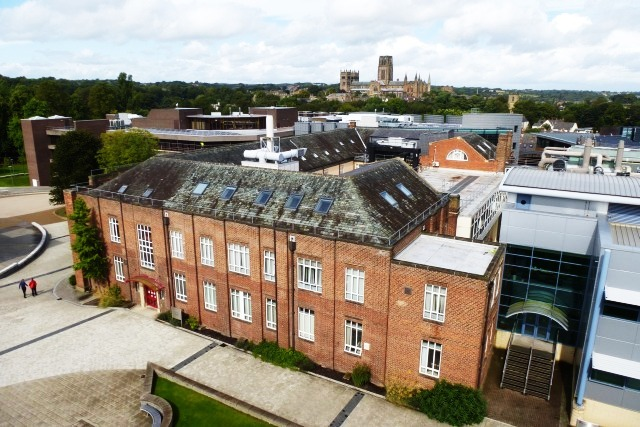
The Dawson Building from the fourth floor of the Calman Learning Centre, with Durham Cathedral in the background over the roof of the Bill Bryson Library

Elvet Colliery closed in 1908, due to flooding.

High Close, on Hollingside Lane, was built in 1919 on land that had been part of the Mountjoy estate rather than Elvet Moor, standing in 1.1-acre (0.45 ha) of land that is now part of Grey College rather than Upper Mountjoy.

The 20th century saw much of Mountjoy transformed from farmland to university campus. University development started on Mountjoy with the Dawson Building, built 1923–24, adjacent to the defunct colliery. The foundation stone was laid on 30 May 1923 by John Lambton, 3rd Earl of Durham, then chancellor of the university. This was also the first university building south of the river since Durham University Observatory in the 1830s. It was originally known as the Science Building until it was named after Sir Arthur James Dawson, a northeast educator, in 1952. In 1924 it housed a single department of science, covering botany, chemistry, geology and physics. The university's botanic garden was established adjacent to the Dawson Building in 1925.

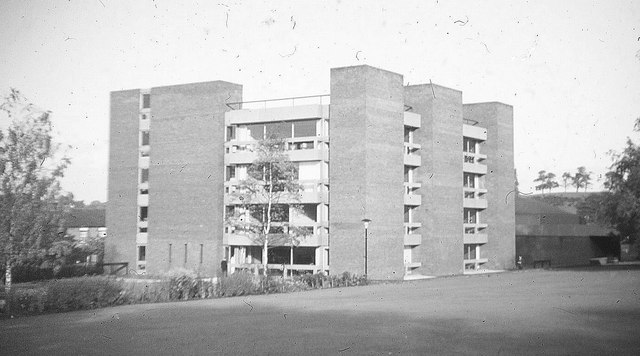
The science library in 1968

The next stage of expansion in Lower Mountjoy came after World War II, with the West Building, designed by Joseph Stanley Allen, professor of town and country planning in the Newcastle division of the university, with William Whitfield as his assistant. This was built in 1950–52 as the first part of a development plan drawn up by Allen in 1947. Pevsner referred to it as "not monumental but with unquestioned dignity, in 1953 a refreshing change from the 'academic classicism' of most then-established universities". It originally housed the departments of geography and mathematics as well as the science library. This was followed by the Physics Building in 1958–62 (named the Rochester Building in 1997 after George Rochester, Professor of Physics), the chemistry, geology and mathematics complex completed in 1964, the science library (designed by Whitfield) in 1962–65, and the engineering buildings in 1963–66, which Pevsner described as having "too many different heights, too many different and unattractive materials" (later named the Christopherson Building and the Higginson Building, after Derman Christopherson, vice-chancellor and warden 1960–1979, and Gordon Higginson, Professor of Engineering). He also decried the number of temporary buildings on the site.

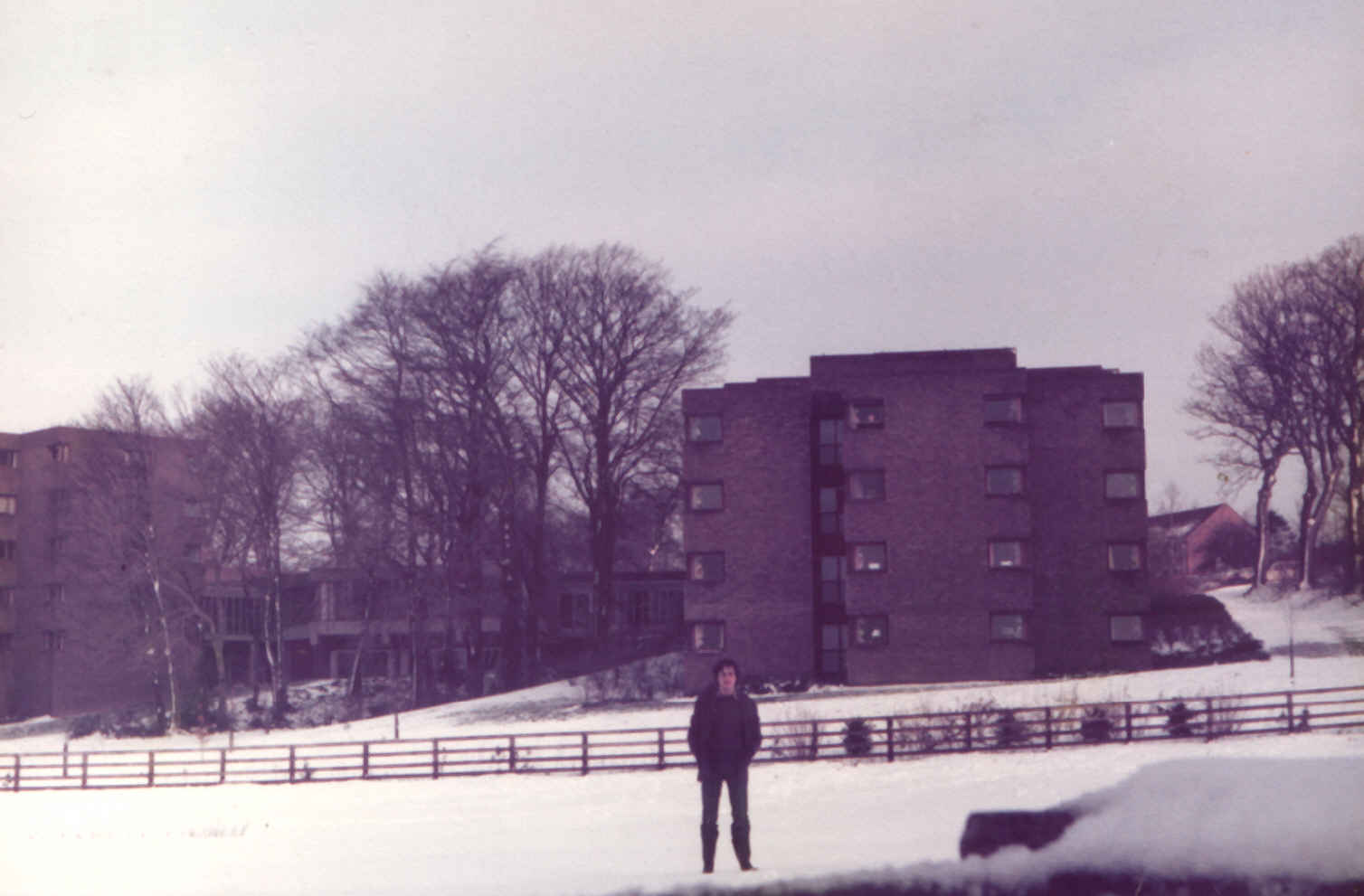
Collingwood college in 1979, showing the two original wings

In the higher part of Mountjoy, Grey College was approved in 1947 and originally planned for a site in Upper Mountjoy. It was eventually built a decade later and further west on the north side of Buck's Hill, with two blocks (Elvet and Hollingside) on Fountains Field, north of Hollingside Lane, and a third block (Oswald) on the south side of the road. The college opened in 1959, with only Elvet block completed, the other two main blocks being added by 1963. Fountains Hall was added in 1971, incorporating the Lattin Chapel, consecrated in 1973 by John Habgood, the Bishop of Durham.

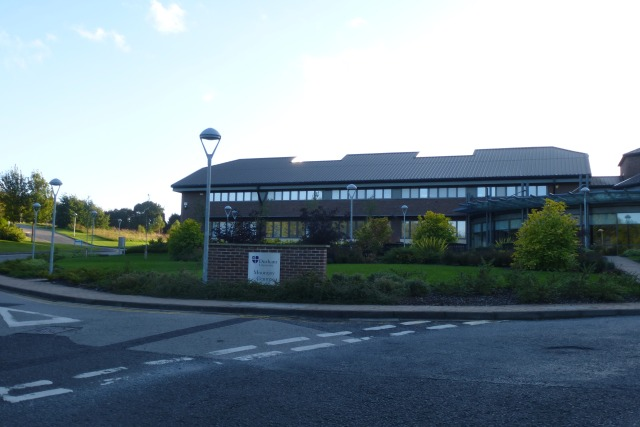
The Mountjoy Centre in Upper Mountjoy

The first building in Upper Mountjoy was the Psychology Building, built in 1966–70 on the site originally intended for Grey College. It was designed by Whitfield and partners and Pevsner noted that it was "probably worth a climb through the wood into the farmland in which it is set", and that there were clear links in its design to the lecture theatre in the West Building and similarities to the later business school, also by Whitfield Partners. The botanic garden moved to a new site on Hollingside Lane on the south side of Buck's Hill in 1970, occupying part of the grounds of Oswald House behind Collingwood College.

In 1968, part of Mountjoy was designated an area of high landscape value following the rejection of the county council's proposal for a green belt. The green belt was eventually established in 1999, with boundaries largely aligned with the area of high landscape value.

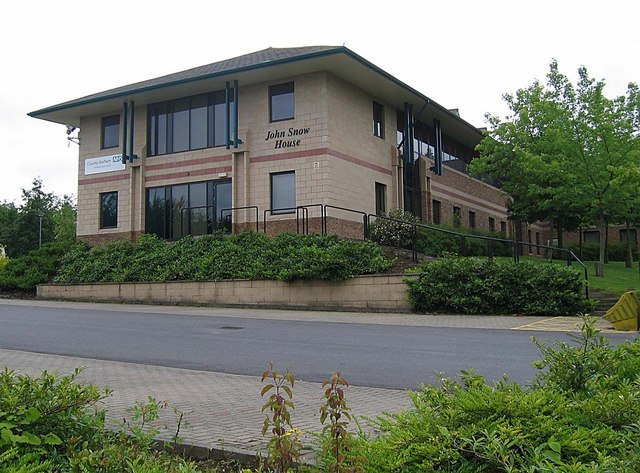
The NHS's John Snow House in Upper Mountjoy

Collingwood College was approved in 1962 and built 1971–73 on the south side of Buck's Hill, on the site of Oswald House and preserving much of the associated parkland. The college opened in 1972, spending its first year accommodated elsewhere before the buildings on Buck's Hill were ready. This was Durham's first purpose-built mixed accommodation, and the first university residence in the UK to have mixed corridors rather than corridors segregated by gender.

In 1982 to 1983, the science library was extended to become the university's main library. Development of the Upper Mountjoy site continued with the Mountjoy Research Centre, built in 1984–86 as an enterprise centre for knowledge-based enterprises in collaboration with developers English Estates. This opened in 1986 with the university's Industrial Research Laboratories being the first tenants, and soon included a more diverse range of businesses than traditional science parks, including David Bellamy's ecological consultancy, property developers specialising in conservation projects, and forensic scientists.

Construction of the biological sciences building in Upper Mountjoy started in 1993. The 1990s also saw extensions to both Collingwood College, where new wings opened in 1993 doubled the accommodation available, and Grey College, with the Holgate House accommodation block and conference centre opening in 1995. Permission to build John Snow House in Upper Mountjoy, home to local National Health Service offices, was granted in 1996 and the building was in use by 1998.

=== 21st century ===
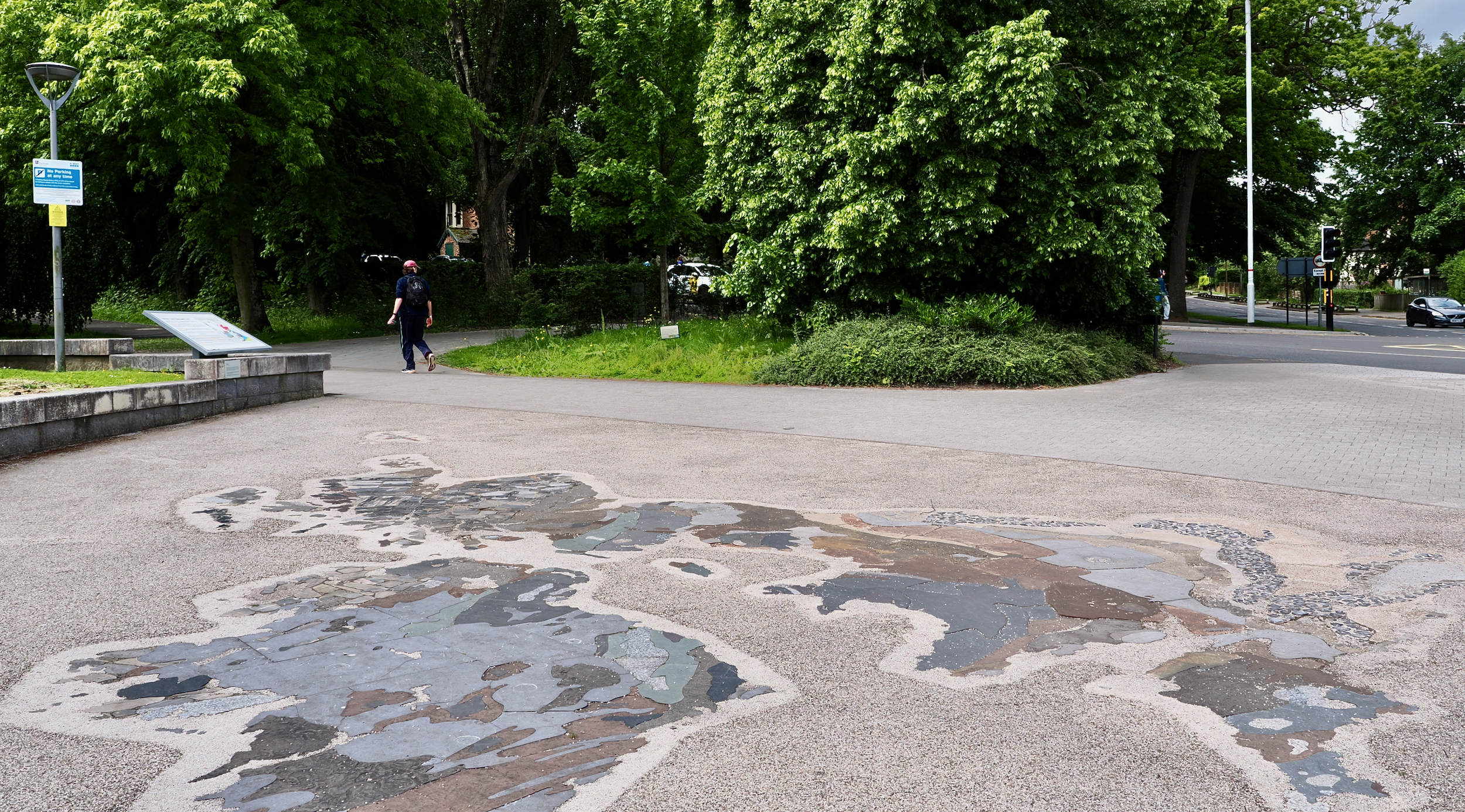
What Lies Beneath Us geological sculpture at the pedestrian entrance to Lower Mountjoy near the Bill Bryson Library, installed in 2013

The 21st century saw further development, with the temporary buildings criticised by Pevsner replaced by the Arthur Holmes Building (2003), named after Arthur Holmes, Professor of Geology, and the Calman Learning Centre (2007), named after Kenneth Calman, vice-chancellor and warden 1998–2006. The Calman Learning Centre, a round four-storey building with large lecture theatres, computer labs and a café, designed by John McManus of the Building Design Partnership, won the City of Durham Trust Architectural Award 2007, where it was cited as "a place-making structure, one which creates its own context".

In 2007, Northumbrian Water constructed a new service reservoir just below the old reservoir, which was around 90 years old and had reached the end of its useful life.

The Institute of Hazard, Risk and Resilience building was added to the south side of the West Building in 2008.

The university's "Gateway Project" saw the building of the Palatine Centre and the extension of the main library, expanding the university's Stockton Road frontage and reclaiming the site of the Elvet Colliery. This involved the capping and filling of three previously-unknown mine shafts. Both of these opened in 2012, with the main library being renamed the Bill Bryson library after the writer Bill Bryson, chancellor of the university 2005–2012. The Palatinate Centre, mainly built in wood and glass with curves and flowing lines, was criticised as a "townscape disaster" by the City of Durham Trust for being out of place in Durham, which is characterised by brick and stone buildings in simple shapes with vertical lines, and for not being sensitive to the scale of the houses on the opposite side of Stockton Road. However, the gateway project as a whole won a discretionary "Outstanding" award in the 2013 County Durham Partnership Environment Awards, run by Durham County Council, and the LABC Building Excellence Northern Award for Best Education Building, also in 2013. It was also awarded a BREEAM excellent rating for sustainability.

In October 2013, a geological sculpture of the British Isles titled What Lies Beneath Us – a map with the geology of each location shown by a sample of the rock found at that location (and, for most areas, from that location) – by artist John de Pauley was unveiled by Iain Stewart at the pedestrian entrance to Lower Mountjoy at the junction of South Road and Stockton Road, near the Bill Bryson Library. The same year, a bronze sculpture, Cry for Justice – The Scream, by local sculptor Fenwick Lawson, inspired by Edvard Munch's painting The Scream and Nick Ut's photograph Napalm Girl, was installed between the West Building and the Bill Bryson Library.

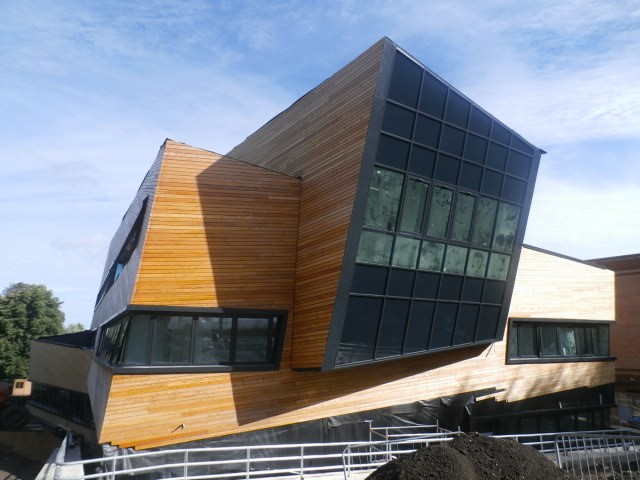
Daniel Libeskind's Ogden Centre for Fundamental Physics opened in 2016

The Ogden Centre for Fundamental Physics, designed by Daniel Libeskind following an international competition, opened in 2016. Another modernist wood and glass building, it also proved controversial, with country councillors describing it as a absolutely lacking taste, "like something children would watch on television", "hideous", a monstrosity and a carbuncle before passing the plans. However, it was critical acclaimed and won the City of Durham Trust architectural award for 2016, with the citation saying that "no building has made such a dramatic impact on the Durham scene since Dunelm House in the 1960s", and the RIBA North East award for 2017.

The Lower Mountjoy Teaching and Learning Centre, the only part of the site west of South Road, opened in 2019. This was clad in grey brick and designed to minimise the apparent bulk of the building, winning the LABC Northern Building Excellence Award for Best Public Service or Educational Building in 2020 and a RIBA North East Award and RIBA National Award in 2021.

The Mathematical Sciences and Computer Science Building in Upper Mountjoy was built between 2018 and 2021. The project also saw the construction of a new entry for cars to Upper Mountjoy from Hollingside Lane, opposite the entrance to the botanic garden, and bicycle lanes alongside Hollingside Lane and parallel to South Road.

== Pilgrim routes and walks ==
The Way of Life is one of the Northern Saints Trails, launched in 2021, following the route of St Cuthbert's body from its temporary rest at Gainford to Durham Cathedral. It climbs 60 metres (200 ft) from the Wear floodplain to the southeast corner of Mountjoy in a flight of 224 steps known as the Doom Steps. After climbing the scarp, medieval pilgrims travelling to Durham Cathedral got their first close view of the cathedral, and so named the hill "Mountjoy" (cf. Monte do Gozo (Mount of Joy) where pilgrims on the French Way got their first sight of Santiago de Compostela Cathedral and the Crusader's name of Mons Gaudii (Mountain of Joy) for the hill (now Nabi Samwil) where they first saw Jerusalem). This view from the top of Mountjoy is now protected as one of the key viewpoints of the Durham Castle and Cathedral World Heritage Site. The view is framed by the trees of the Great High Wood and the Little High Wood and, in addition to Mountjoy's associations with pilgrimage and the legends of St Cuthbert's arrival in Durham, clearly shows the architectural innovation of the cathedral and castle and the relationship between these two main components of the world heritage site, as well as containing other heritage assets such as St Oswald's Church and St Nicholas' Church. It has been assessed as a high value view of national or regional importance.

From this high point, the path descends north down the ridge along Bluebell Lane, then turns west of Mount Joy hill to cross the A177 Stockton Road by the entrance to Durham University's Lower Mountjoy site. The same route over Mountjoy is followed by a section of the Finchale Camino Inglés, part of the Camino de Santiago, established in 2019 between Durham and Bishop Auckland. Mountjoy is also included as one of the hills on the Durham City Seven Hills Trail, and in two of The Times' "Times Walks".

== University ==
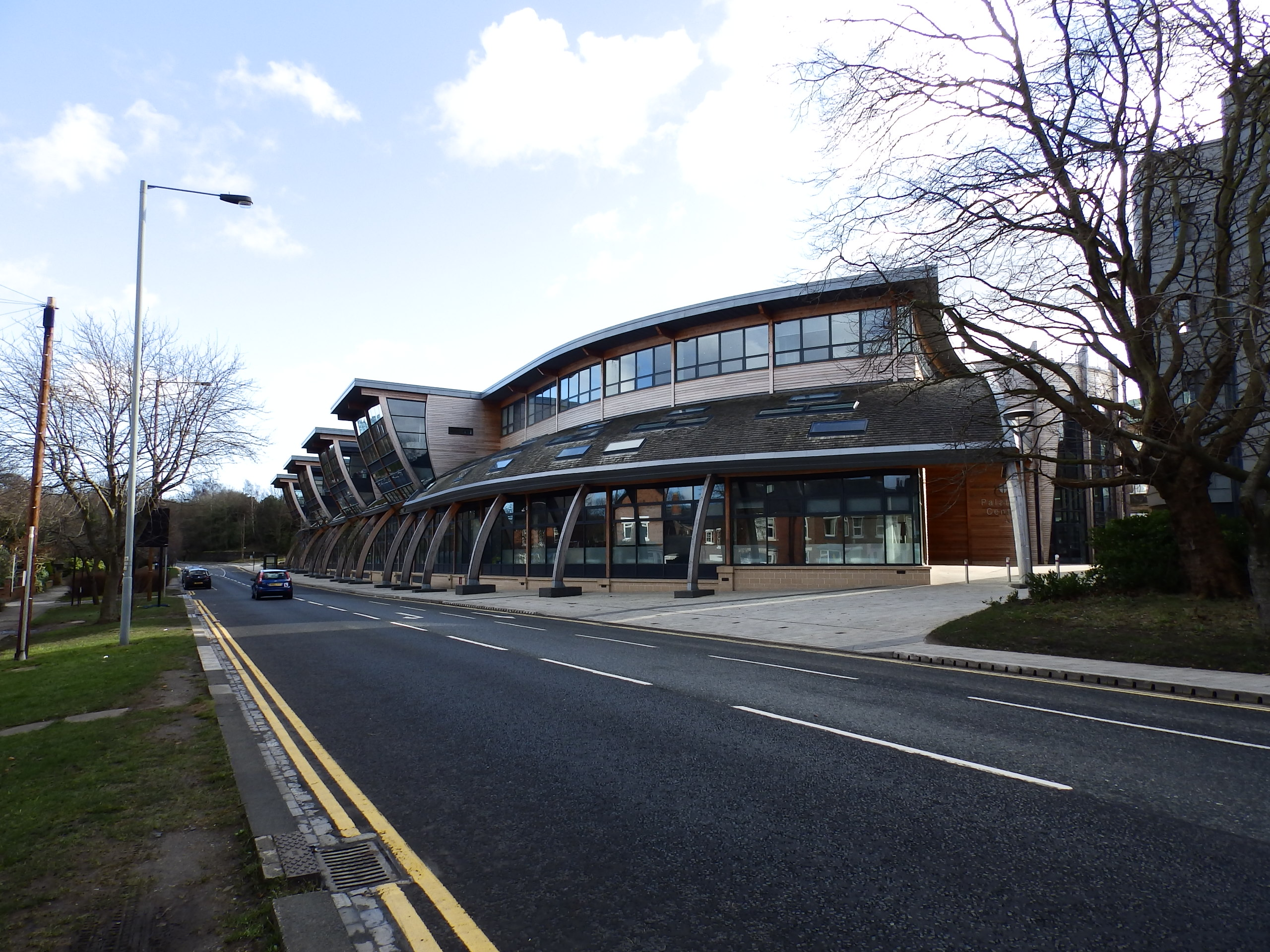
The Palatine Centre on Stockton Road at the north side of the Mountjoy site, home of the university's administration

Durham University's Mountjoy site (formerly the science site) contains many of the university's departments, including all of the departments in the faculty of science and most of the departments in the faculty of social science and health. The site is divided into Lower Mountjoy, in the corner formed by the A177 Stockton Road and the A177 South Road on the lower slopes, and Upper Mountjoy, on the plateau near the top of the escarpment, separated from Lower Mountjoy by the Little High Wood. Buck's Hill on the west side of Mountjoy is home to two of the university's colleges: Grey College on the north side and Collingwood College on the south side, as well as Durham University Botanic Garden and Hollingside House, the residence of the vice-chancellor and warden.

=== Lower Mountjoy ===
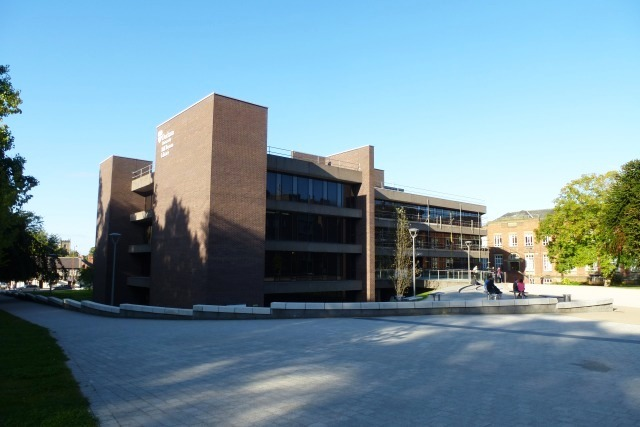
The Bill Bryson Library in 2014, with the Dawson Building in the background

Lower Mountjoy is home to Durham University's central administration in the Palatine Centre and the university's main library, the Bill Bryson Library, as well as academic departments and research institutes.

While none of the university buildings are pre-20th century, a number are locally listed as non-designated heritage assets, including the Dawson Building (1923–24), the West Building (1950–52) and the Bill Bryson Library (1962–65, with major extensions in 1982–83 and 2012), and the 21st-century Calman Learning Centre and Arthur Holmes Building (2003–07) and Ogden Centre for Fundamental Physics (2015–17), along with the What Lies Beneath Us geological floor sculpture and the Cry for Justice – The Scream sculpture.

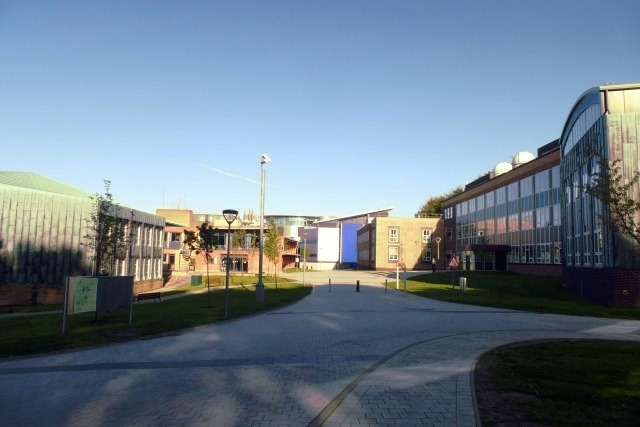
View from the South Road entrance to Lower Mountjoy, with the West Building and the IHRR annex (left), the Calman Learning Centre and the Arthur Holmes Building (centre background) and the Rochester Building (right)

In the faculty of social sciences and health, the departments of archaeology and anthropology are in the Dawson Building, the department of geography is in the West Building, the school of education is based in the Confluence Building and the law school is in the Palatine Centre. The faculty offices and the offices for the combined honours in social sciences course are located in the Arthur Holmes building, while the centre for academic development is located in the Teaching and Learning Centre.

In the faculty of science, chemistry is based in the Chemistry Building, which also houses the faculty offices, physics in the Rochester Building, engineering in the Christopherson Building and the Higginson Building, and earth sciences in the Arthur Holmes Building.

Research institutes on the site included the Institute for Computational Cosmology and the Institute for Particle Physics Phrnomenology in the Ogden Centre, the Institute for Hazard Risk and Resilience in an annex to the West Building, the Durham Energy Institute and the Biophysical Sciences Institute in the Arthur Holmes Building, and the Institute of Advanced Research Computing in the Higginson Building

Central teaching facilities not attached to any department are located in the Calman Learning Centre and the Lower Mountjoy Teaching and Learning Centre. The Calman Learning Centre has three large lecture theatres: Arnold Wolfendate (capacity 400, named after Sir Arnold Wolfendale, professor of physics and Astronomer Royal), Rosemary Cramp (capacity 260, named after Dame Rosemary Cramp, first female professor at the university and professor of archaeology) and Ken Wade (capacity 260, named after Kenneth Wade, professor of chemistry), as well as two flexible rooms: Kingsley Barrett (capacity 110, named after C. K. Barrett, professor of divinity) and Derman Christopherson (capacity 80, named after Sir Derman Christopherson, vice-chancellor and warden). The Teaching and Learning Centre has 250 and 500 capacity lecture theatres as well as a variety of flexible rooms seating between 24 and 100 people and 400 study spaces. Other large lecture theatres with a capacity of over 200 on the Lower Mountjoy site include Applebey (West Building; capacity 275; named after Malcolm Applebey, chair of the Durham Colleges Council 1937–1955); Scarbrough (Chemistry Building; capacity 264; named after Roger Lumley, 11th Earl of Scarbrough, chancellor of the university 1958–1969); and Dawson (Dawson Building; capacity 228).

=== Upper Mountjoy ===
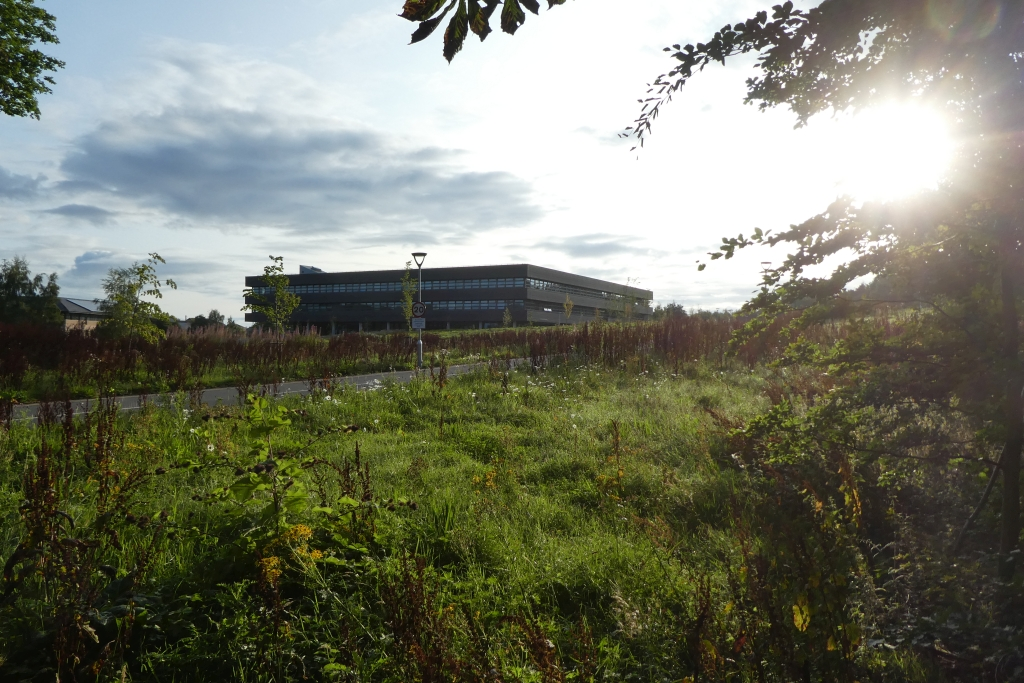
The Mathematical Sciences and Computer Science building in Upper Mountjoy

The Upper Mountjoy site is home to the departments of psychology, biosciences, mathematical sciences, and computer sciences, all from the faculty of science. The Mathematical Sciences and Computer Sciences building also includes the Hazan Venture Lab, intended to equip students for entrepreneurship and to encourage student start-ups. The Mountjoy Centre houses research institutes, including the Biophysical Sciences Institute, the Durham Energy Institute and the Wolfson Research Institute for Health and Wellbeing.

John Snow House in Upper Mountjoy is the headquarters of the NHS North of England Care System Support.
